= Military history of Pakistan =

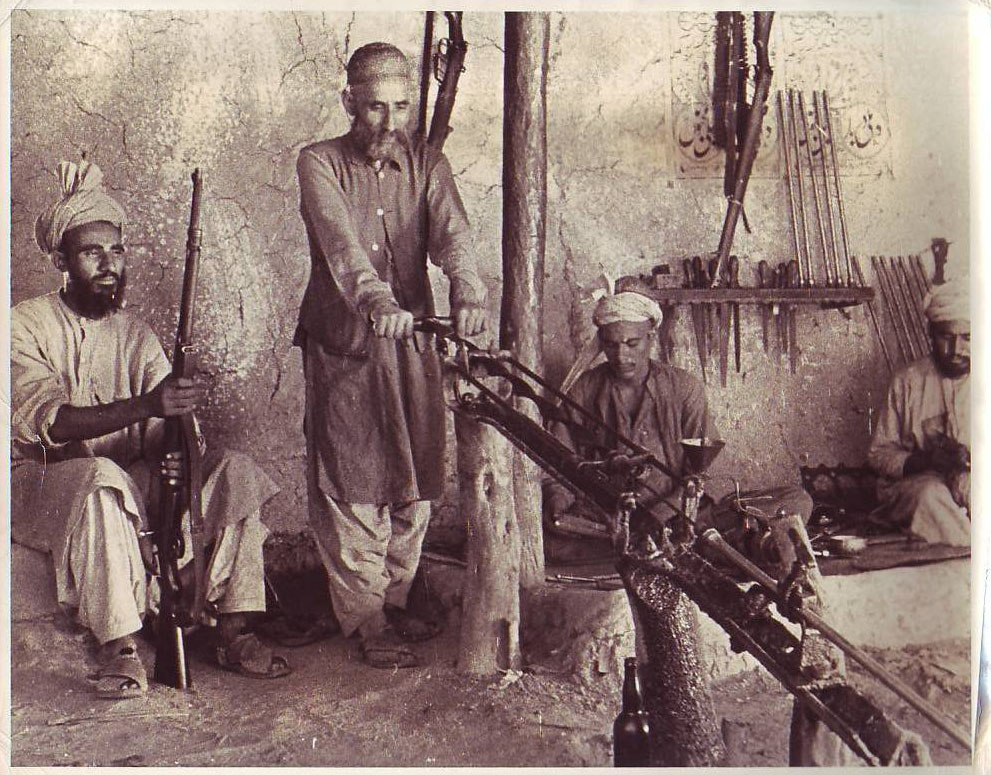
The roots of the Pakistan Army lie in the pre-independence British Indian Army, whose ranks included many soldiers from areas that now form Pakistan. Shown here are troops of the Khyber Rifles, c.1895.

The military history of Pakistan (Urdu: تاريخ عسكری پاكِستان) covers the development, organization, and operations of the Pakistan Armed Forces from the country's creation in 1947 to the present day. Although the territory of modern Pakistan has witnessed warfare since ancient times, the history of the modern Pakistani military properly begins with the country's independence and the division of the British Indian Army.

The armed forces occupy a prominent position in the political and national history of the country. Since independence, the military has remained one of Pakistan’s most powerful institutions and has periodically intervened in politics through military coups, citing civilian mismanagement or corruption. Civilian governments have frequently consulted senior military leaders on matters of national security, particularly concerning the Kashmir conflict and foreign policy.

Since 1947, Pakistan’s armed forces have fought three major wars with India (1947–48, 1965, and 1971) and a limited conflict in Kargil in 1999, in addition to smaller border skirmishes with Afghanistan. Following the September 11 attacks, the military has been engaged in extensive counter-insurgency and counter-terrorism operations in Khyber Pakhtunkhwa and the former Federally Administered Tribal Areas, targeting the Tehrik-i-Taliban Pakistan and affiliated groups.

Pakistan has also participated in numerous international United Nations peacekeeping missions. As of 2025, Pakistan was among the top troop-contributing countries, with more than 4,000 personnel deployed in missions across Africa, Asia, and the Middle East.

== 550 BCE – 1857 CE ==
=== Ancient empires ===
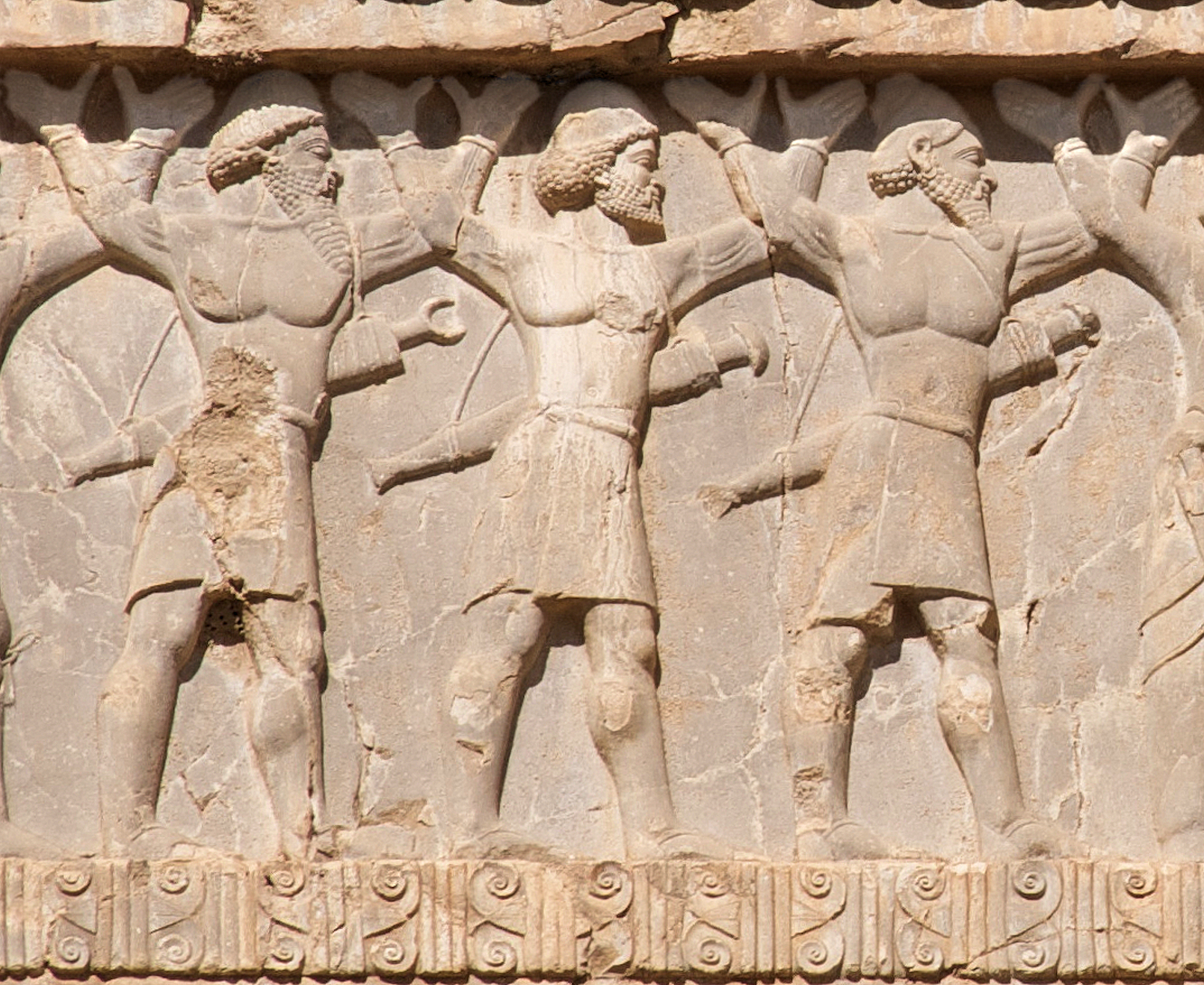
Achaemenid soldiers of the three territories of Sattagydia, Gandhara and Hindush respectively, from modern day's Pakistan

The region of modern-day Pakistan (part of British Raj before 1947) formed the most-populous, easternmost and richest satrapy of the Persian Achaemenid Empire for almost two centuries, starting from the reign of Darius the Great (522–485 BC). The first major conflict erupted when Alexander the Great overthrew the Achaemenid Empire in 334 BCE and marched eastwards. After defeating King Porus in the fierce Battle of the Hydaspes (near modern Jhelum), he conquered much of the Punjab region. But his battle weary troops refused to advance further into India to engage the formidable army of the Nanda Dynasty and its vanguard of elephants, new monstrosities to the invaders. Therefore, Alexander proceeded southwest along the Indus valley. Along the way, he engaged in several battles with smaller kingdoms before marching his army westward across the Makran desert towards modern Iran. Alexander founded several new Macedonian/Greek settlements in Gandhara and Punjab.

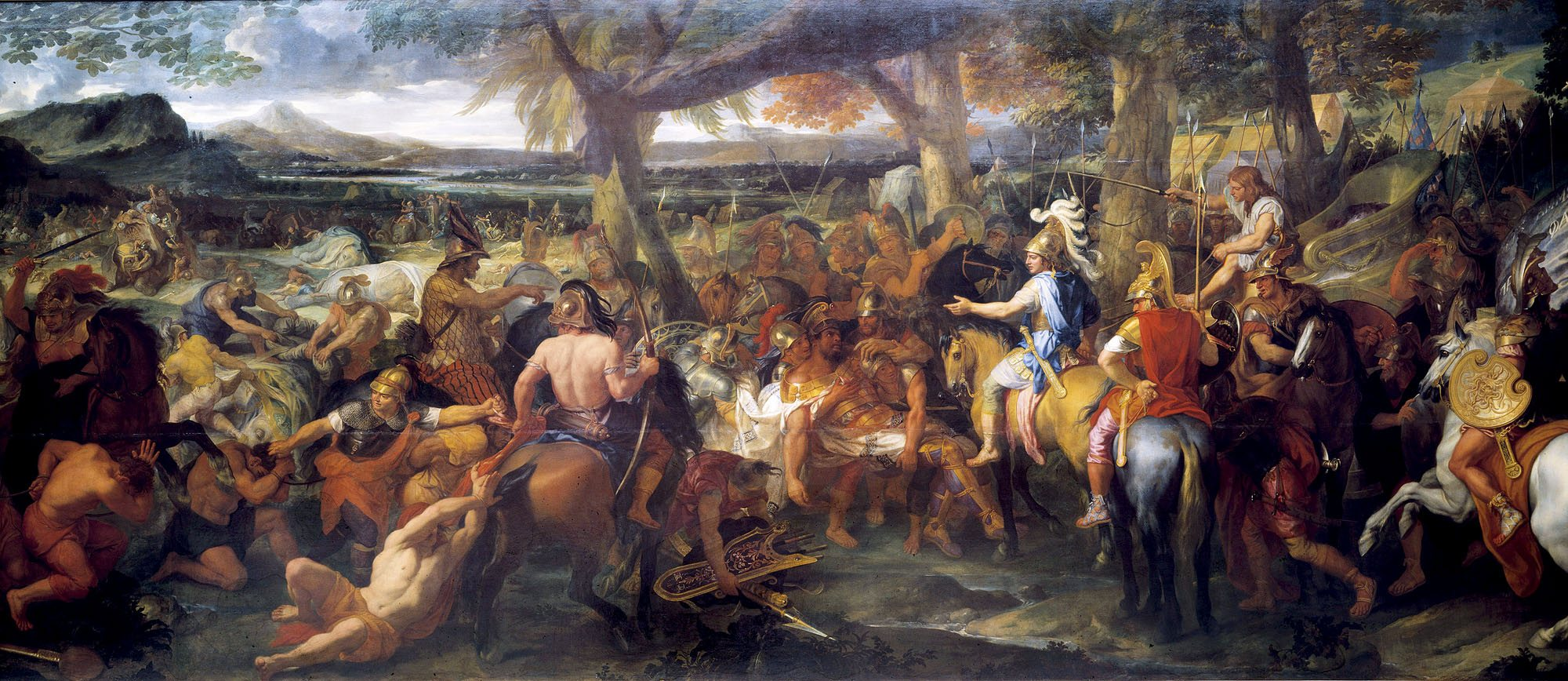
A painting by Charles Le Brun depicting Alexander and Porus during the Battle of the Hydaspes near modern-day Jhelum, Punjab.

As Alexander the Great's Greek and Persian armies withdrew westwards, the satraps left behind by Alexander were defeated and conquered by Chandragupta Maurya, who founded the Maurya Empire, which ruled the region from 321 to 185 BC. The Mauryas Empire was itself conquered by the Shunga Empire, which ruled the region from 185 to 73 BC. Other regions such as the Khyber Pass were left unguarded, and a wave of foreign invasion followed. The Greco-Bactrian king, Demetrius, capitalised and conquered southern Afghanistan and Pakistan around 180 BC, forming the Indo-Greek Kingdom. The Indo-Greek Kingdom ultimately disappeared as a political entity around 10 AD following the invasions of the Central Asian Indo-Scythians. Their empire morphed into the Kushan Empire who ruled until 375 AD. The region was then conquered by the Persian Indo-Sassanid Empire which ruled large parts of it until 565 AD.

=== Muslim conquests ===
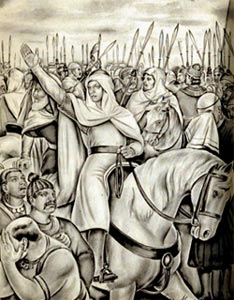
Muhammad Bin Qasim leading his troops in battle.

In 712 CE, an Arab Muslim military commander called Muhammad bin Qasim conquered most of the Indus region (stretching from Sindh to Multan) for the Umayyad Empire. In 997 CE, Mahmud of Ghazni conquered the bulk of Khorasan|Khorasan]], marched on Peshawar in 1005, and followed it by the conquests of Punjab (1007), Balochistan (1011), Kashmir (1015) and Qanoch (1017). By the end of his reign in 1030, Mahmud's empire extended from Kurdistan in the west to the Yamuna river in the east, and the Ghaznavid dynasty lasted until 1187. In 1160, Muhammad Ghori conquered Ghazni from the Ghaznavids and became its governor in 1173. He marched eastwards into the remaining Ghaznavid territory and Gujarat in the 1180s, but was rebuffed by Gujarat's Solanki rulers. In 1186–87, he conquered Lahore, bringing the last of Ghaznevid territory under his control and ending the Ghaznavid Empire. Muhammad Ghori returned to Lahore after 1200 to deal with a revolt of the Rajput Ghakkar tribe in the Punjab. He suppressed the revolt, but was killed during a Ghakkar raid on his camp on the Jhelum River in 1206. Muhammad Ghori's successors established the first Indo-Islamic dynasty, the Delhi Sultanate. The Mamluk Dynasty, (mamluk means "slave" and referred to the Turkic slave soldiers who became rulers throughout the Islamic world), seized the throne of the Sultanate in 1211. Several Turko-Afghan dynasties ruled their empires from Delhi: the Mamluk (1211–1290), the Khalji (1290–1320), the Tughlaq (1320–1413), the Sayyid (1414–1451) and the Lodhi (1451–1526). Although some kingdoms remained independent of Delhi – in Gujarat, Malwa (central India), Bengal and Deccan – almost all of the Indus plain came under the rule of these large Indo-Islamic sultanates. Perhaps the greatest contribution of the sultanate was its temporary success in insulating South Asia from the Mongol invasion from Central Asia in the 13th century; nonetheless the sultans eventually lost Afghanistan and western Pakistan to the Mongols (see the Ilkhanate Dynasty).

=== Mughal Empire ===
From the 16th to the 19th century, the formidable Mughal Empire covered much of India. In 1739, the Persian emperor Nader Shah invaded India, defeated the Mughal Emperor Muhammad Shah, and occupied most of Balochistan and the Indus plain. After Nadir Shah's death, the kingdom of Afghanistan was established in 1747 by one of his generals, Ahmad Shah Abdali, and included Kashmir, Peshawar, Daman, Multan, Sindh and Punjab. In the south, a succession of autonomous dynasties (the Daudpotas, Kalhoras and Talpurs) had asserted the independence of Sind, from the end of Aurangzeb's reign. Most of Balochistan came under the influence of the Khan of Kalat, apart from some coastal areas such as Gwadar, which were ruled by the Sultan of Oman.

The Sikh Confederacy (1748–1799) was a group of small states in the Punjab that emerged in a political vacuum created by rivalry between the Mughals, Afghans and Persians. The Confederacy drove out the Mughals, repelled several Afghan invasions and in 1764 captured Lahore. However, after the retreat of Ahmed Shah Abdali, the Confederacy suffered instability as disputes and rivalries emerged. The Sikh empire (1799–1849) was formed on the foundations of the Confederacy by Ranjit Singh who proclaimed himself "Sarkar-i-Wala", and was referred to as the Maharaja of Lahore. His empire eventually extended as far west as the Khyber Pass and as far south as Multan. Amongst his conquests were Kashmir in 1819 and Peshawar in 1834, although the Afghans made two attempts to recover Peshawar.

=== British annexation ===
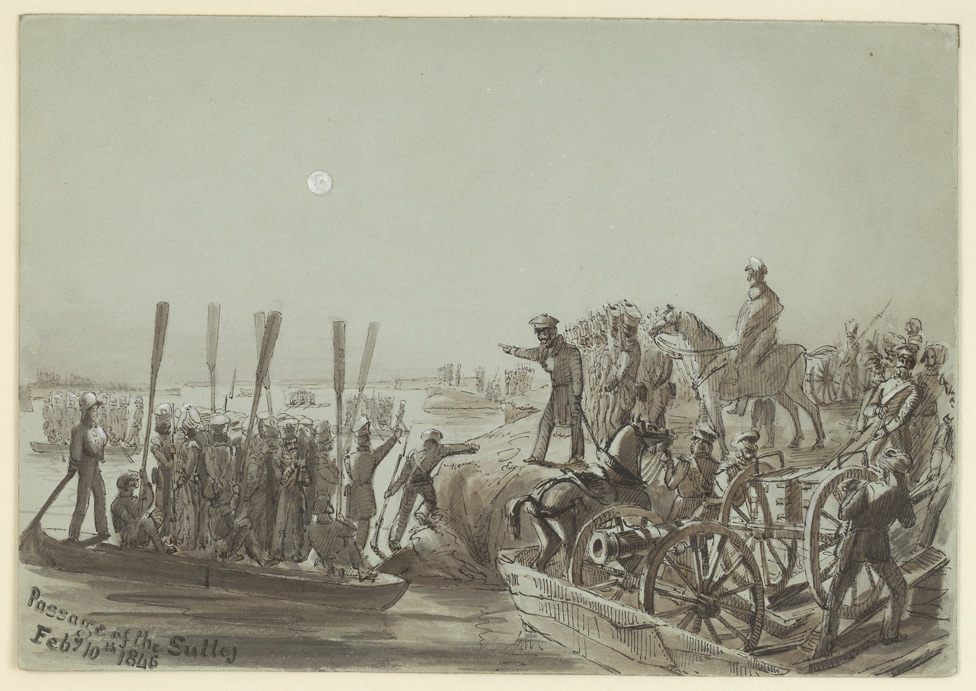
British troops crossing the Sutlej River in 1846 during the First Anglo-Sikh War

None of the territory of modern Pakistan was ruled by the British, or other European powers, until 1839, when Karachi, then a small fishing village with a mud fort guarding the harbour, was taken, and held as an enclave with a port and military base for the First Afghan War that soon followed. The rest of Sindh was taken in 1843, and in the following decades, first the East India Company, and then after the post-Sepoy Mutiny (1857–1858) direct rule of Queen Victoria of the British Empire, took over most of the country partly through wars, and also treaties. The main wars were that against the Baloch Talpur dynasty, ended by the Battle of Miani (1843) in Sindh, the Anglo-Sikh Wars (1845–1849) and the Anglo-Afghan Wars (1839–1919). By 1893, all modern Pakistan was part of the British Indian Empire, and remained so until independence in 1947.

After Ranjit Singh's death, the Sikh Empire was weakened by internal divisions and political mismanagement. It fell to the British in 1849 after the Second Anglo-Sikh War.

Different regions of Pakistan were conquered by East India Company as below:

- Sindh was conquered by Battle of Hyderabad and Battle of Miani in 1843.
- Punjab and eastern Khyber Pakhtunkhwa were conquered during Second Anglo-Sikh War in 1849.

Regions conquered by British Raj are as below:

- Southern Balochistan came under control by Treaty of Kalat in 1876.
- Western Balochistan was conquered by British empire in Second Anglo-Afghan War through Treaty of Gandamak, in 1879.

== 1857–1947 ==
=== British Raj ===
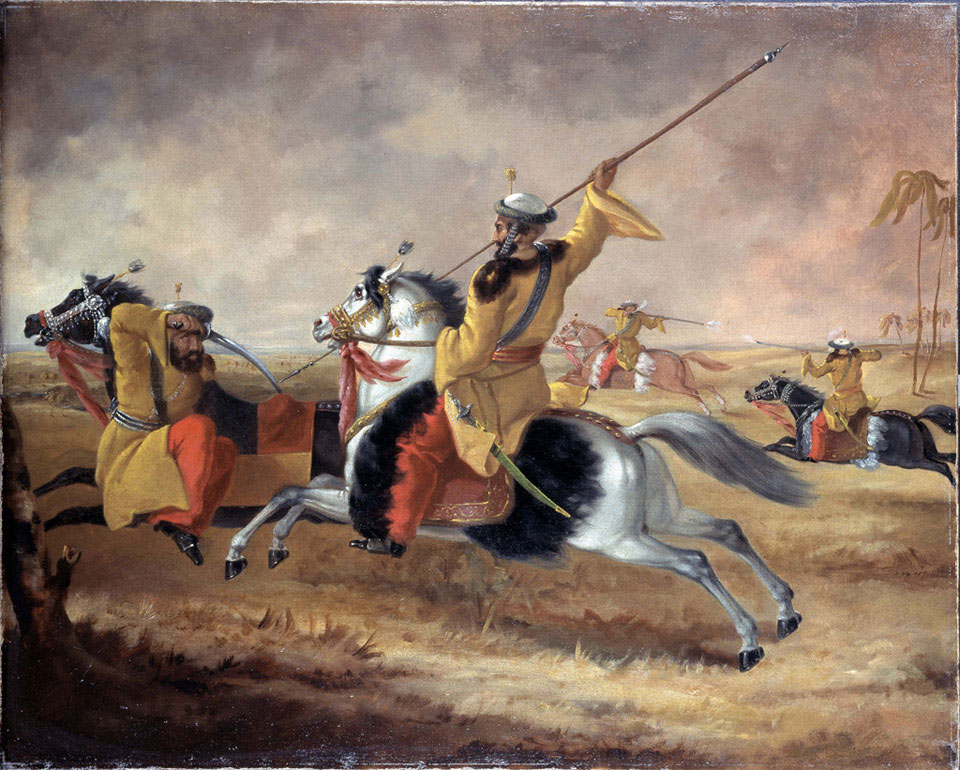
Skinner's Horse at Exercise, 1840

Following the Indian Rebellion of 1857, control of British India passed from the East India Company to the Crown. The three Presidency armies remained separate forces, each with its own commander-in-chief. Overall operational control was exercised by the commander-in-chief of the Bengal Army, who was formally the commander-in-chief of the East Indies. From 1861 onwards, most of the officer corps' manpower was pooled in the three Presidential Staff Corps. Following the Second Anglo-Afghan War, a royal commission recommended the reorganisation of the presidency armies into one army; by then, the ordnance, supply and transport and pay branches of the three armies were already unified. In 1895, the presidency armies were merged into the British Indian Army, which was divided into four commands, including the Punjab command.

=== The World Wars ===
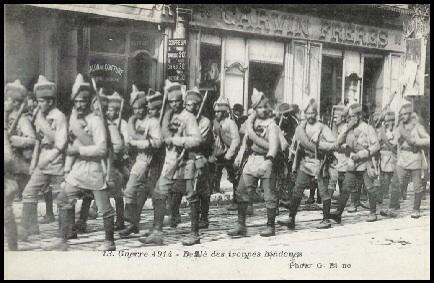
Punjabi Muslim soldiers of the British Indian Army arrive in France, 1914

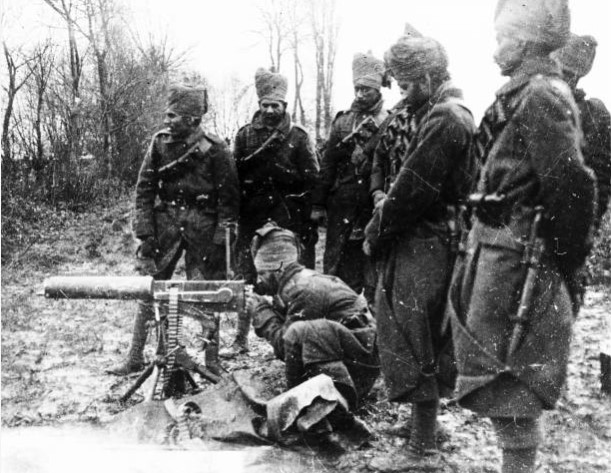
Soldiers of the 129th Baluchis in Flanders. The Kullah or conical top was typically worn by Punjabi Muslim soldiers

During World War I, the British Indian Army fought in Egypt, Palestine, Mesopotamia, Gallipoli, France, and Belgium and suffered very heavy casualties. Many troops from modern day Pakistan such as Khudadad Khan, Shahamad Khan and Mir Dast fought in France (including Flanders in modern Belgium) and received the Victoria Cross.

The British Indian Army's strength was about 189,000 in 1939. There were about 3,000 British officers and 1,115 Indian officers. The army was expanded greatly to fight in World War II. By 1945, the strength of the Army had risen to about 2.5 million men, and is considered the largest volunteer force in history. There were about 34,500 British officers and 15,740 Indian officers. The Army took part in campaigns in France, East Africa, North Africa, Syria, Tunisia, Malaya, Burma, Greece, Sicily and Italy.They helped expel Rommel from North Africa, turned back the Japanese at Imphal and helped break the Gothic line in northern Italy, thus opening a third front into Germany. The British Indian Army suffered 179,935 casualties in the war (including 24,338 killed, 64,354 wounded, 11,762 missing and 79,481 POW soldiers). Many future military officers and leaders of Pakistan fought in these wars.

=== Birth of the modern military ===
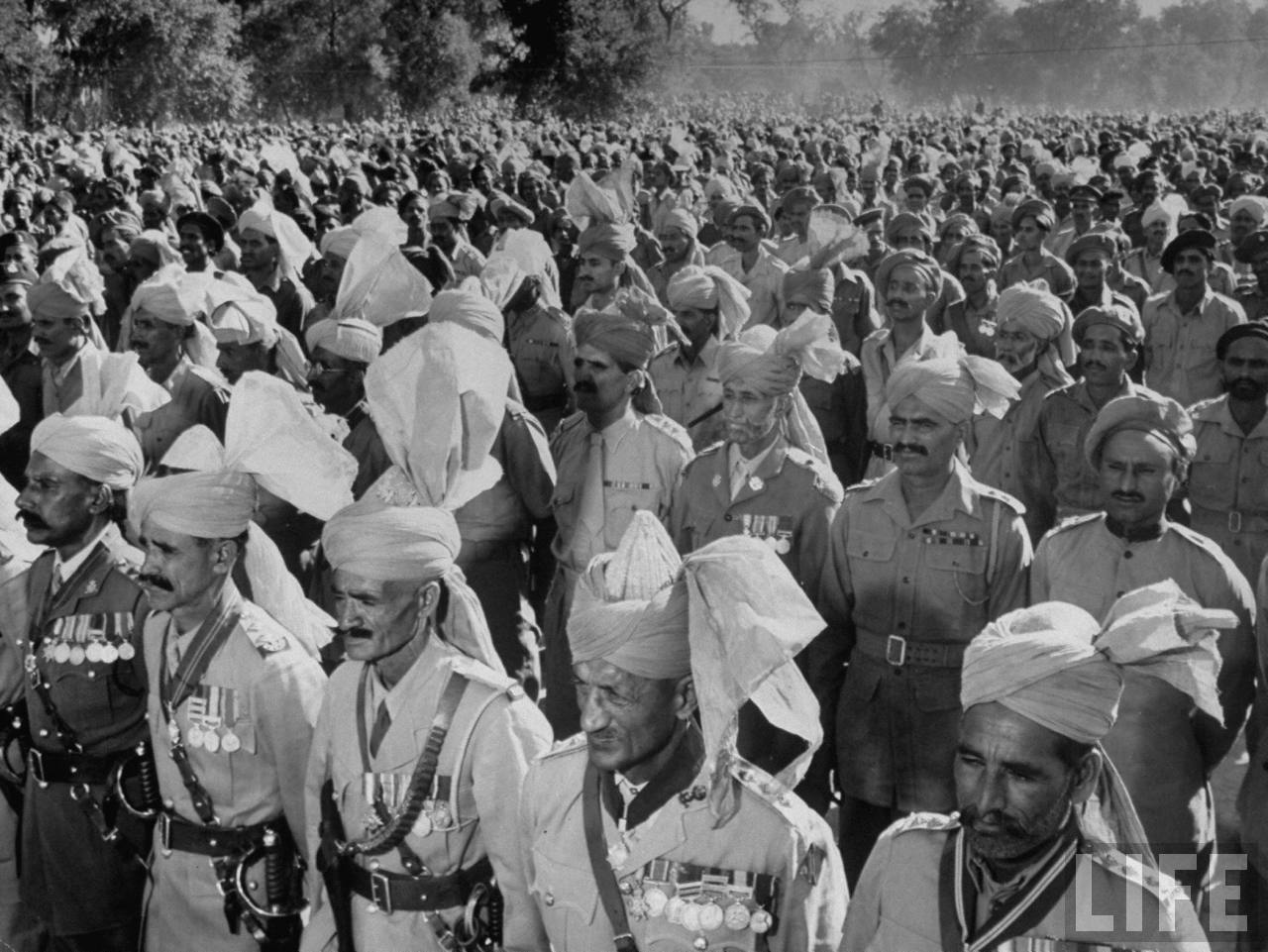
Members of the newly formed Pakistani Security Guard standing at attention during a parade for Pakistan’s leader Muhammad Ali Jinnah, 1947.

On 3 June 1947, the British Government announced its plan to partition British India into the independent dominions of India and Pakistan. The division of the British Indian Army was finalized on 30 June 1947, with Pakistan receiving approximately 36% of the total military establishment, corresponding to its share of population and defense requirements. This included six armoured, eight artillery, and eight infantry regiments, while India retained the remaining formations.

At the time of independence, Pakistan faced significant logistical challenges: most military infrastructure, including training centers, depots, and manufacturing facilities, were located within India. Many Pakistani troops and officers were stationed at Indian bases and had to be relocated by rail during the mass migrations and communal violence of partition. By late 1947, the newly formed Pakistan Armed Forces had around 150,000 personnel, including 2,300 officers—short of the 4,000 estimated requirement. To fill the gap, several hundred British and Commonwealth officers remained temporarily, along with volunteers from Poland and Hungary.

General Sir Frank Messervy served as the first Commander-in-Chief, Pakistan Army, succeeded by Sir Douglas Gracey in 1948. Under their command, Pakistan organized four divisions in West Pakistan and one in East Pakistan, though many formations initially operated below full strength. Both India and Pakistan assumed complete operational control of their respective armed forces on 15 August 1947. Field Marshal Sir Claude Auchinleck, the last Commander-in-Chief, India, clarified to both dominions that, in the event of conflict, the Commonwealth forces would remain neutral.

== 1947–1965 ==
=== The war of 1947 ===
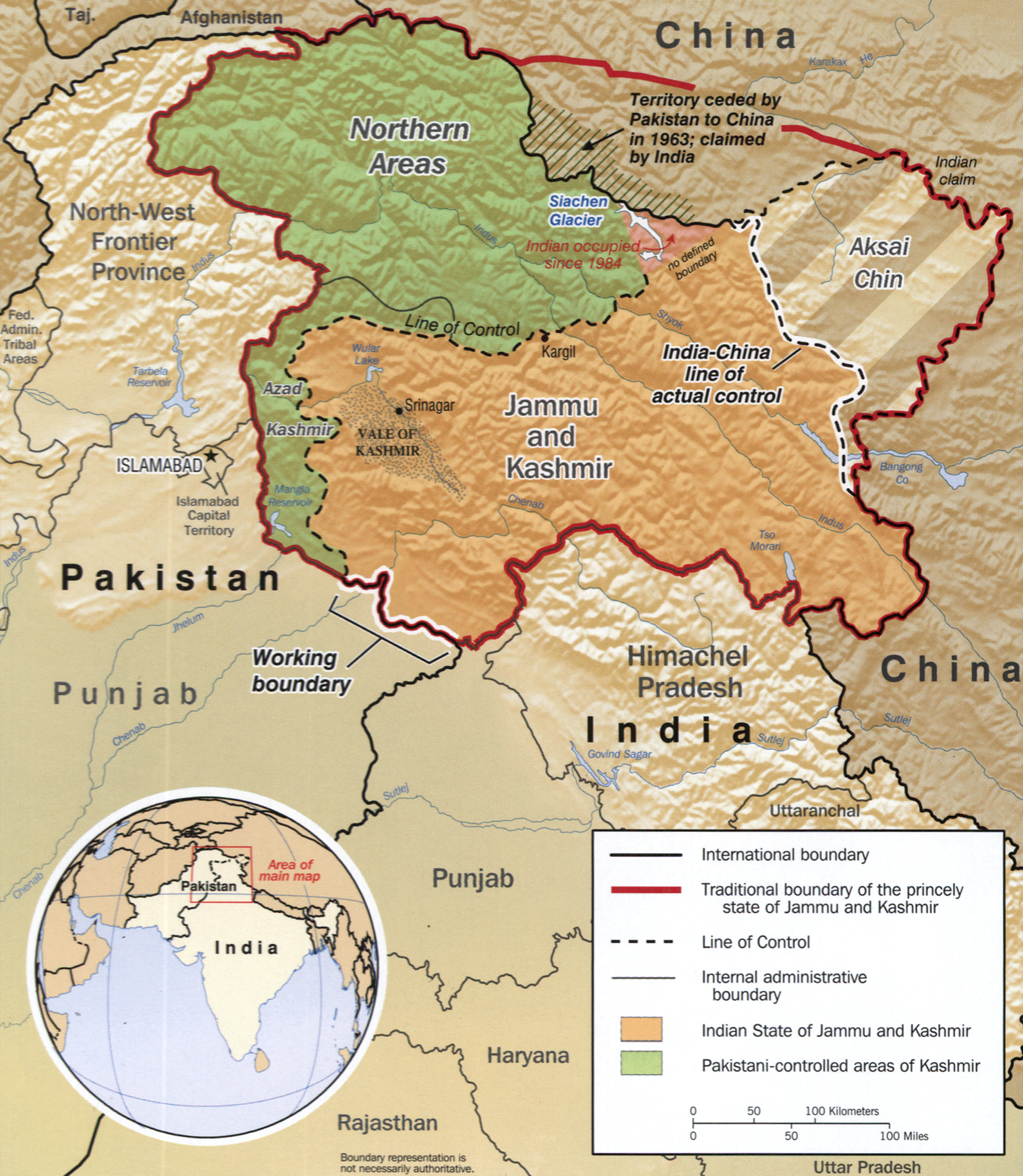
Map showing areas under Indian, Pakistani, and Chinese administration in Kashmir.

Area shaded in green represents Pakistan-administered Kashmir, orange represents India-administered Kashmir, and the northeastern area is under Chinese control.

Armed tribal militias from Pakistan’s North-West Frontier Province, supported by elements of Pakistan’s military, entered the princely state of Jammu and Kashmir in October 1947. The state, ruled by Maharaja Hari Singh, had a Muslim-majority population but had not yet decided whether to join India or Pakistan. Facing an invasion and the threat of losing control of his capital, the Maharaja requested military assistance from India. On 26 October 1947, he signed the Instrument of Accession to India, which was accepted by Governor-General Lord Mountbatten on 27 October.

Indian forces were airlifted to Srinagar and engaged in heavy fighting with the invading forces. The conflict lasted until a United Nations–brokered ceasefire took effect on 1 January 1949, establishing a ceasefire line that left roughly one-third of the territory under Pakistani administration (now Azad Jammu and Kashmir and Gilgit-Baltistan) and the rest under Indian administration.

=== US aid ===
With the failure of the United States to persuade India to join an anti-communist pact, it turned towards Pakistan, which in contrast with India was prepared to join such an alliance in return of military and economic aid and also to find a potential ally against India. By 1954, the US had decided that Pakistan along with Turkey and Iran would be ideal countries to counter Soviet influence. Therefore, Pakistan and the US signed the Mutual Defense Assistance Agreement and American aid began to flow into Pakistan. This was followed by two more agreements. In 1955, Pakistan joined the South East Asian Treaty Organization (SEATO) and the Baghdad Pact, later renamed the Central Asian Treaty Organization (CENTO) when Iraq withdrew in 1959.

Pakistan received over a billion dollars in US military aid between 1954 and 1965. This aid greatly enhanced Pakistan's defence capability as new equipment and weapons were brought into the armed forces, new military bases were created, existing ones were expanded and upgraded, and two new Corps commands were formed. Shahid M Amin, who had served in the Pakistani foreign service, wrote, "It is also a fact, that these pacts did undoubtedly secure very substantial US military and economic assistance for Pakistan in its nascent years and significantly strengthened it in facing India, as seen in the 1965 war."

American and British advisers trained Pakistani personnel and the US was allowed to create bases within Pakistan's borders to spy on the Soviet Union. In this period, many future Pakistani presidents and generals went to American and British military academies, which led to the Pakistan army developing along Western models, especially following the British.

After Dominion status ended in 1956 with the formation of a Constitution and a declaration of Pakistan as an Islamic Republic, the military took control in 1958 and held power for more than 10 years. During this time, Pakistan had developed close military relations with many Middle Eastern countries to which Pakistan sent military advisers, a practice which continues into the 21st century.

=== First military rule ===
In 1958, retired Major-General and President Iskander Mirza took over the country, deposed the government of Prime Minister Feroz Khan Noon, and declared martial law on October 7, 1958. President Mirza personally appointed his close associate General Ayub Khan as the Commander-in-Chief of Pakistan's army. However, Khan ousted Mirza when he became highly dissatisfied by Mirza's policies. As president and commander-in-chief, Ayub Khan appointed himself a 5-star Field Marshal and built relationships with the United States and the West. A formal alliance including Pakistan, Iran, Iraq, and Turkey was formed and was called the Baghdad Pact (later known as CENTO), which was to defend the Middle East and Persian Gulf from Soviet communists designs.

=== Border clashes with Afghanistan ===
Armed tribal incursions from Afghanistan into Pakistan's border areas began with the transfer of power in 1947 and became a continual irritant. Many Pashtun Afghans regarded the 19th century Anglo-Afghan border treaties (historically called the Durand Line) as void and were trying to re-draw the borders with Pakistan or to create an independent state (Pashtunistan) for the ethnic Pashtun people. The Pakistan Army had to be continually sent to secure the country's western borders. Afghan–Pakistan relations were to reach their lowest points in 1955 when diplomatic relations were severed with the ransacking of Pakistan's embassy in Kabul and again in 1961 when the Pakistan Army had to repel a major Afghan incursion in Bajaur region.

Pakistan used American weaponry to fight the Afghan incursions but the weaponry had been sold under the pretext of fighting Communism and the US was not pleased with this development, as the Soviets at that time became the chief benefactor to Afghanistan. Some sections of the American press blamed Pakistan for driving Afghanistan into the Soviet camp.

=== Alliance with China ===
After India's defeat in the Sino-Indian War of 1962, India began a rapid program of reforming and expanding its military. A series of conferences on Kashmir was held from December 1962 to February 1963 between India and Pakistan. Both nations offered important concessions and a solution to the long-standing dispute seemed imminent. However, after the Sino-Indian war, Pakistan had gained an important new ally in China and Pakistan then signed a bilateral border agreement with China that involved the boundaries of the disputed state, and relations with India again became strained.

Fearing a communist expansion into India, the US for the first time gave large quantities of weapons to India. The expansion of the Indian armed forces was viewed by most Pakistanis as being directed towards Pakistan rather than China. The US also pumped in large sums of money and military supplies to Pakistan as it saw Pakistan as being a check against Soviet expansionist plans.

== 1965–1979 ==
=== The War of 1965 ===
Following the Sino-Indian War of 1962, Pakistan perceived that India’s military had been weakened and saw an opportunity to press its territorial claims in Kashmir. In April 1965, border clashes occurred in the Rann of Kutch, where Pakistani and Indian forces fought a series of limited engagements. The fighting ended after British mediation restored the status quo, and neither side achieved a decisive victory.

Encouraged by its performance in Kutch, Pakistan launched Operation Gibraltar in August 1965, sending thousands of armed infiltrators across the ceasefire line into Jammu and Kashmir to incite local uprisings against Indian rule. The operation failed when local support did not materialize, and India responded by crossing the international border on 6 September 1965, marking the start of the Indo-Pakistani War of 1965.

The war saw large-scale tank battles and air engagements along the western front. Both sides captured limited areas of each other’s territory, but independent analyses suggest that India held more territory overall—approximately 1,800 square kilometres of Pakistani land, compared with Pakistan’s capture of about 550 square kilometres of Indian territory.

The United Nations called for an immediate ceasefire, which came into effect on 23 September 1965. The United States imposed an arms embargo on both nations, which affected Pakistan more severely due to its reliance on American-supplied military hardware.

The war concluded with the Tashkent Agreement in January 1966, brokered by the Soviet Union, which restored pre-war boundaries and reaffirmed both countries’ commitment to peaceful resolution of disputes. Most neutral historians and international observers describe the conflict as a military stalemate, with both sides claiming victory.

=== Rebuilding the armed forces ===
After the Indo-Pakistani War of 1965, the United States was disappointed that both India and Pakistan had used American-supplied military equipment in an offensive conflict, contrary to U.S. policy that such weapons be used only for defence. The Johnson Administration consequently suspended military assistance to both nations. By July 1967, Washington withdrew its Military Assistance Advisory Group from Pakistan, and defence cooperation between the two countries declined sharply. In response, Pakistan refused to renew the lease on the Peshawar Air Station (used by the CIA for intelligence gathering), which formally closed in 1969.

The Soviet Union simultaneously deepened its defence partnership with India, supplying MiG-21 fighter aircraft and T-55 tanks, while Pakistan—affected by the U.S. embargo—sought new partners. Pakistan turned increasingly toward the People’s Republic of China, which provided several hundred Type 59 tanks, MiG-19 (J-6) fighter aircraft, and equipment for new infantry divisions. France also supplied Mirage III fighter jets and Daphne-class submarines, while limited purchases were made from Italy and West Germany.

These new sources of weaponry allowed Pakistan to gradually rebuild its armed forces, though the loss of U.S. support and the growing Indo–Soviet partnership left it relatively weaker in strategic terms during the late 1960s.

=== Involvement in Arab conflicts ===
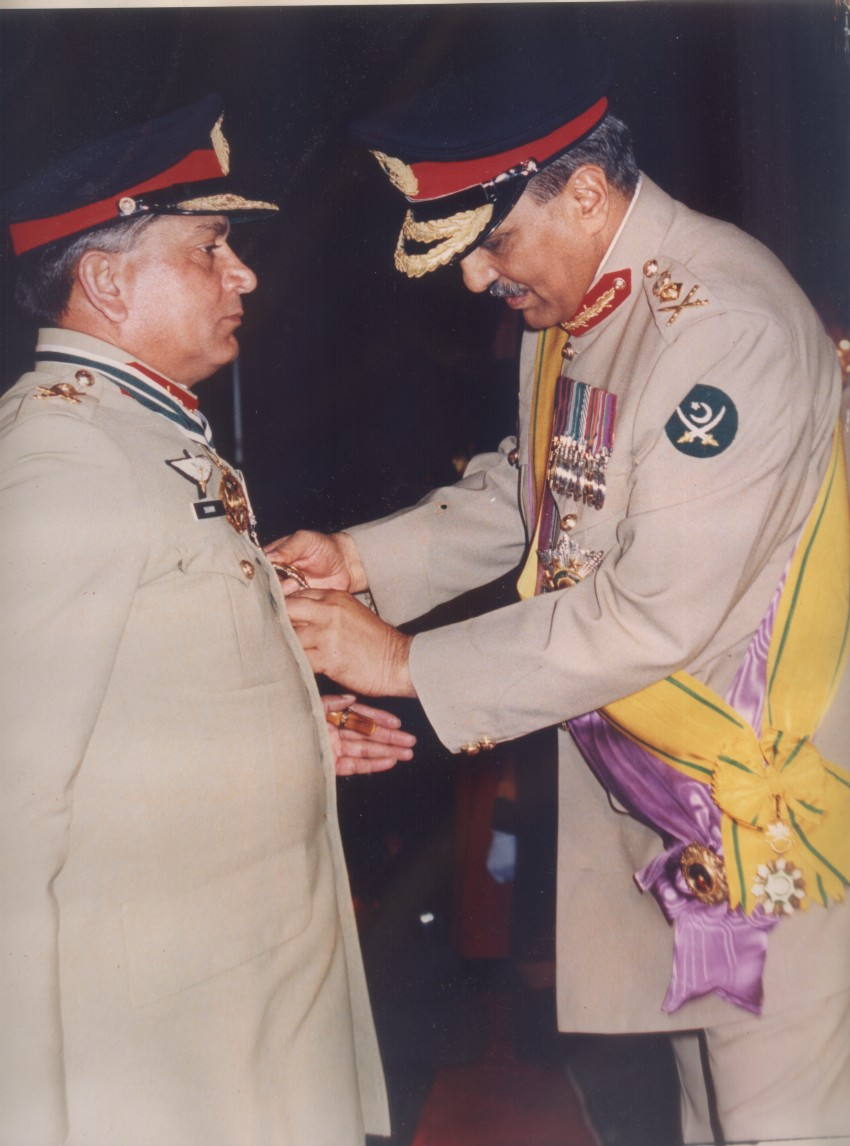
General Zia-ul-Haq

Pakistan had sent numerous military advisers to Jordan and Syria to help in their training and military preparations for any potential war with Israel. When the Six-Day War started, Pakistan assisted by sending a contingent of its pilots and airmen to Egypt, Jordan and Syria. PAF pilots downed about 10 Israeli planes including Mirages, Mysteres and Vautours without losing a single plane of their own.

Jordan and Iraq decorated East Pakistani Flight Lieutenant Saif-ul-Azam. Israelis also praised the performance of PAF pilots. Eizer Weizman, then Chief Of Israeli Air Force wrote in his autobiography about Air Marshal Noor Khan (Commander PAF at that time): "...He is a formidable person and I am glad that he is Pakistani and not Egyptian." No Pakistani ground forces participated in the war.

After the end of the Six-Day War, Pakistani advisors remained to train the Jordanian forces. In 1970, King Hussein of Jordan decided to remove the PLO from Jordan by force after a series of terrorist acts attributed to the PLO, which undermined Jordanian sovereignty. On September 16, King Hussein declared martial law. The next day, Jordanian tanks attacked the headquarters of Palestinian organisations in Amman. The head of Pakistan's training mission to Jordan, Brigadier-General Zia-ul-Haq (later President of Pakistan), took command of the Jordanian Army's 2nd division and helped Jordan during this crisis.

Pakistan again assisted during the Yom Kippur War, sixteen PAF pilots volunteered for service in the Air Forces of Egypt and Syria. The PAF contingent deployed to Inchas Air Base (Egypt) led by Wing Commander Masood Hatif and five other pilots plus two air defence controllers. During this war, the Syrian government decorated Flight Lieutenant Sattar Alvi when he shot down an Israeli Mirage over the Golan Heights. The PAF pilots then became instructors in the Syrian Air Force at Dumayr Air Base and after the war Pakistan continued to send military advisers to Syria and Jordan. Apart from military advisers, no Pakistani ground forces participated in this war.

In 1969, South Yemen, which was under a communist regime and a strong ally of the USSR, attacked and captured Mount Vadiya inside the province of Sharoora in Saudi Arabia. Many PAF officers as well Army personnel who were serving in Khamis Mushayt training the Saudi Air Force (the closest airbase to the battlefield), took active part in this battle in which the enemy was ultimately driven back.

=== The War of 1971 ===
The first democratic elections in Pakistan were held in 1970 with the Awami League (AL) winning a substantial majority in East Pakistan while the Pakistan Peoples Party (PPP) won a majority in West Pakistan. However talks on sharing power failed and President Yahya Khan declared martial law. PPP leader Zulfikar Ali Bhutto had refused to accept an AL government and declared he would "break the legs" of any of his party members who attended the National Assembly. Capitalizing on West Pakistani fears of East Pakistani separatism, Bhutto demanded to form a coalition with AL leader Sheikh Mujibur Rahman. They agreed upon a coalition government, with Bhutto as president and Mujibur as prime minister, and put political pressure on Khan's military government. Pressured by the military, Khan postponed the inaugural session, and ordered the arrests of Mujibur and Bhutto.

Faced with popular unrest and revolt in East-Pakistan, the army and navy attempted to impose order. Khan's military government ordered Rear-Admiral Mohammad Shariff, Commander of Eastern Naval Command of the Pakistan Navy, and Lieutenant-General Amir Abdullah Khan Niazi, Commander of the Eastern Military Command of Pakistan Army, to curb and liberate East Pakistan from the resistance. The navy and army crackdown and brutalities during Operation Searchlight and Operation Barisal and the continued killings throughout the later months resulted in further resentment among the East Pakistanis. With India assisting and funding the Mukti Bahini, war broke out between the separatist supporters in Bangladesh and Pakistan (Indo-Pakistani War of 1971). During the conflict, the co-ordination between the armed forces of Pakistan were ineffective and unsupported. The army, navy, marines and air force were not consulted in major decisions, and each force led their own independent operations without notifying the higher command. To release the pressure from East Pakistan the Pakistan Army opened new front on the western sector when a 2,000-strong Pakistani force attacked the Indian outpost at Longewala held by 120 Indian soldiers of 23 Punjab regiment. The attack was backed by a tank regiment but without air support. The battle was decisively won by the Indian army with the help of the Indian Air Force, and was an example of poor co-ordination by Pakistan.

The war concluded with the surrender of the Pakistan Armed Forces Eastern Command to Lieutenant General Jagjit Singh Aurora, representing the Indian Armed Forces and the allied Mukti Bahini, at Dhaka on 16 December 1971. Under the Instrument of Surrender, approximately 93,000 Pakistani military personnel and civilians became prisoners of war in India. The formal surrender marked the end of the Indo-Pakistani War of 1971, resulting in Pakistan’s defeat and the independence of Bangladesh (formerly East Pakistan).

=== Recovery from the 1971 War ===
The military government collapsed as a result of the war, and control of the country was handed over to the Zulfikar Ali Bhutto. Bhutto became the country's first Chief Martial Law Administrator and first Commander-in-Chief of Pakistan Armed Forces. Taking authority in January 1972, Bhutto started a nuclear deterrence programme under Munir Ahmad Khan and his adviser Abdus Salam. In July 1972, Bhutto reached the Shimla Agreement with Indira Gandhi of India, and brought back 93,000 POWs and recognised East-Pakistan as Bangladesh.

As part of re-organizing the country, Bhutto disbanded the "Commander-in-Chief" title in the Pakistan Armed Forces. He also decommissioned the Pakistan Marines as a unit of Pakistan Navy. Instead, Chiefs of Staff were appointed in the three branches and Bhutto appointed all 4 star officers as the Chief of Staff in the Pakistan Armed Forces. General Tikka Khan, infamous for his role in Bangladesh Liberation War, become the first Chief of Army Staff; Admiral Mohammad Shariff, as first 4-star admiral in the navy and as the first Chief of Naval Staff; and, Air Chief Marshal (General) Zulfiqar Ali Khan, as first 4-star air force general, and the first Chief of Air Staff. Because the co-ordination between the armed forces were unsupported and ineffective, in 1976, Bhutto also created the office of Joint Chiefs of Staff Committee for maintaining the co-ordination between the armed forces. General Muhammad Shariff, a 4-star general, was made the first Chairman of the Joint Chiefs of Staff Committee.

Pakistan's defence spending rose by 200% during the Bhutto's democratic era but the India–Pakistan military balance, which was near parity during the 1960s, was growing decisively in India's favour. Under Bhutto, the education system, foreign policy, and science policy was rapidly changed. The funding of science was exponentially increased, with classified projects at Pakistan Atomic Energy Commission and Kahuta Research Laboratories. Bhutto also funded the classified military science and engineering projects entrusted and led by Lieutenant-General Zahid Ali Akbar of the Pakistan Army Corps of Engineers.

The US lifted its arms embargo in 1975 and once again became a major source for military hardware, but by then Pakistan had become heavily dependent on China as an arms supplier. Heavy spending on defence re-energized the Army, which had sunk to its lowest morale following the debacle of the 1971 war. The high defence expenditure took money from other development projects such as education, health care and housing.

=== Baloch nationalist uprisings ===
The Baloch rebellion of the 1970s was the most-threatening civil disorder to Pakistan since Bangladesh's secession. The Pakistan Armed Forces wanted to establish military garrisons in Balochistan Province, which at that time was quite lawless and run by tribal justice. The ethnic Balochis saw this as a violation of their territorial rights. Emboldened by the stand taken by Sheikh Mujibur Rahman in 1971, the Baloch and Pashtun nationalists had also demanded their "provincial rights" from then-Prime Minister Zulfikar Ali Bhutto in exchange for a consensual approval of the Pakistan Constitution of 1973. But while Bhutto admitted the North West Frontier Province (NWFP) and Balochistan to a NAP-JUI coalition, he refused to negotiate with the provincial governments led by chief minister Ataullah Mengal in Quetta and Mufti Mahmud in Peshawar. Tensions erupted and an armed resistance began to take place.

Surveying the political instability, Bhutto's central government sacked two provincial governments within six months, arrested the two chief ministers, two governors and forty-four MNAs and MPAs, obtained an order from the Supreme Court banning the NAP and charged them all with high treason, to be tried by a specially constituted Hyderabad Tribunal of handpicked judges.

In time, the Baloch nationalist insurgency erupted and sucked the armed forces into the province, pitting the Baloch tribal middle classes against Islamabad. The sporadic fighting between the insurgency and the army started in 1973 with the largest confrontation taking place in September 1974 when around 15,000 Balochs fought the Pakistan Army, Navy and the Air Force. Following the successful recovery of ammunition in the Iraqi embassy, shipped by both Iraq and Soviet Union for the Baluchistan resistance, Naval Intelligence launched an investigation and cited that arms were smuggled from the coastal areas of Balochistan. The Navy acted immediately, and entered the conflict. Vice-Admiral Patrick Simpson, commander of Southern Naval Command, began to launch a series of operations under a naval blockade.

The Iranian military, which feared a spread of the greater Baloch resistance in Iran, aided Pakistan's military in putting down the insurrection. After three days of fighting the Baloch tribals were running out of ammunition and withdrew by 1976. The army had suffered 25 fatalities and around 300 casualties in the fight while the rebels lost 5,000 people as of 1977.

Although major fighting had broken down, ideological schisms caused splinter groups to form and steadily gain momentum. Despite the overthrow of the Bhutto government in 1977 by General Zia-ul-Haque, Chief of Army Staff, calls for secession and widespread civil disobedience remained. The military government then appointed General Rahimuddin Khan as Martial Law Administrator over the Balochistan Province. The provincial military government under the famously authoritarian General Rahimuddin began to act as a separate entity and military regime independent of the central government.

This allowed Rahimuddin Khan to act as an absolute martial law administrator, unanswerable to the central government. Both Zia-ul-Haq and Rahimuddin Khan supported the declaration of a general amnesty in Balochistan to those willing to give up arms. Rahimuddin then purposefully isolated feudal leaders such as Nawab Akbar Khan Bugti and Ataullah Mengal from provincial policy. He also put down all civil disobedience movements, effectively leading to unprecedented social stability within the province. Due to martial law, his reign (1977–1984) was the longest in the history of Balochistan.

Tensions later resurfaced in the province with the Pakistan Army being involved in attacks against an insurgency known as the Balochistan Liberation Army. Attempted uprisings have taken place as recently as 2005.

=== Second military rule ===
During the 1977 elections, rumours of widespread voter fraud led to the civilian government under Zulfikar Ali Bhutto being overthrown in a bloodless coup of July 1977 (See Operation Fair Play). The new ruler was Chief of Army Staff General Zia-ul-Haq who became Chief Martial Law Administrator in 1978. Zia-ul-Haq was appointed by Bhutto after Bhutto forced seventeen senior general officers to retire. Zia appointed Mushtaq Hussain as chief jurist for Bhutto's case. Mushtaq Hussain was publicly known to hate Bhutto, and had played a controversial role in Bhutto's removal as foreign minister in 1965. As his judge, Hussain disrespected Bhutto and his hometown and denied any appeals. Under Zia's direction and Hussain's order, Bhutto was executed in 1979 after the Supreme Court upheld the High Court's death sentence on charges of authorising the murder of a political opponent. Under Zia's military dictatorship (which was declared legal under the Doctrine of Necessity by the Supreme Court in 1978) the following initiatives were taken:

- Strict Islamic law was introduced into the country's legal system by 1978, contributing to current-day sectarianism and religious fundamentalism, and instilling a sense of religious purpose within the youth.
- Pakistan fought a war by proxy against the Communists in Afghanistan in the Soviet–Afghan War, greatly contributing to the eventual withdrawal of Soviet forces from Afghanistan.
- Secessionist uprisings in Balochistan were put down by the province's authoritarian ruler, General Rahimuddin Khan, who ruled for an unprecedented seven years under martial law.
- The socialist economic policies of the previous civilian government, which included aggressive nationalisation, were gradually reversed; Pakistan's Gross National Product rose greatly.

Zia lifted martial law in 1985, holding party-less elections and handpicking Muhammad Khan Junejo to be the Prime Minister of Pakistan, who in turn reappointed Zia as Chief of Army Staff until 1990. Junejo however gradually fell out with Zia as his political and administrative independence grew – such as by asking his Minister of State to sign the Geneva Accord, which President Zia disliked. After a large-scale explosion at a munitions store in Ojhri, Junejo vowed to bring those responsible for the significant damage caused to justice, implicating several times the Inter-Services Intelligence (ISI) Director-General Akhtar Abdur Rahman.

President Zia dismissed the Junejo government on several charges in May 1988. He then called for elections in November. Zia-ul-Haq died in a plane crash on August 17, 1988, which was later proven to be highly sophisticated sabotage by unknown perpetrators.

Under Zia, defence spending increased an average 9 percent per annum during 1977–1988 while development spending rose 3 percent per annum; by 1987–88 defence spending had overtaken development spending. For the 1980s as a whole, defence spending averaged 6.5 percent of GDP. This contributed strongly to large fiscal deficits and a rapid buildup of public debt.

== 1979–1999 ==
=== Development of atomic bomb projects ===
Soon after Bhutto assumed control of Pakistan, he established nuclear weapons development. On January 20, 1972, Abdus Salam, after being requested by Zulfikar Ali Bhutto, arranged and managed a secret meeting of academic scientists and engineers with Bhutto in Multan city. It was there that Bhutto orchestrated, administered, and led the scientific research on nuclear weapons as he announced the official nuclear weapons development programme. In 1972, Pakistan's core intelligence service, the ISI, secretly learned that India was close to developing an atomic bomb, under its nuclear programme. Partially in response, defence expenditure and funding of science under then-Prime Minister Bhutto increased by 200%. In the initial years, Abdus Salam, a Nobel laureate, headed the nuclear weapons program as he was the prime minister's science adviser. He is also credited with recruiting hundreds of Pakistani scientists, engineers, and mathematicians to the nuclear weapons development program; he later formed and headed the Theoretical Physics Group (TPG), the special weapons division of the Pakistan Atomic Energy Commission (PAEC) that developed the designs of the nuclear weapons.

Throughout that time, the foundations were laid down to develop a military nuclear capability. This included the nuclear fuel cycle and nuclear weapons design, development and testing programme. The fuel cycle program included the uranium exploration, mining, refining, conversion and Uranium Hexafluoride (UF_{6}) production, enrichment and fuel fabrication and reprocessing facilities. These facilities were established in PAEC by Munir Ahmad Khan. He was appointed PAEC Chairman on January 20, 1972, at the Multan Conference of senior scientists and engineers. Earlier, Munir Ahmad Khan was serving as Director of Nuclear Power and Reactors Division, IAEA. He was credited as the "technical father" of Pakistan's atom project by a recent International Institute of Strategic Studies, London, (IISS) dossier on history of the Pakistan's nuclear development, with Zulfikar Ali Bhutto as the father of Pakistan's nuclear developmental programme.

After Chief Martial Law Administrator (later president) and Chief of Army Staff General Zia-ul-Haq came to power (see Operation Fair Play), further advancements were made to enrich uranium and consolidate the nuclear development programme. On March 11, 1983, the PAEC under Munir Ahmad Khan carried out the first successful cold test of a working nuclear device near at the Kirana Hills under codename Kirana-I. The test was led by CERN-physicist Ishfaq Ahmad, and was witnessed by other senior scientists belonging to Pakistan Armed Forces and the PAEC. To compound matters further, the Soviet Union had withdrawn from Afghanistan and the strategic importance of Pakistan to the United States was gone. Once the full extent of Pakistan's nuclear weapons development was revealed, economic sanctions (see Pressler amendment) were imposed on the country by several other countries, particularly the US. Having been developed under both Bhutto and Zia, the nuclear development programme had fully matured by the late 1980s. Abdul Qadeer Khan, a metallurgical engineer, greatly contributed to the uranium enrichment programme under both governments. A Q Khan established an administrative proliferation network through Dubai to smuggle URENCO nuclear technology to Khan Research Laboratories. He then established Pakistan's gas-centrifuge program based on the URENCO's Zippe-type centrifuge. Khan is considered to be the founder of Pakistan's HEU-based gas-centrifuge uranium enrichment programme, which was originally launched by PAEC in 1974.

The PAEC also played its part in the success and development of the uranium-enrichment programme by producing the uranium hexafluoride gas feedstock for enrichment. PAEC was also responsible for all the pre- and post-enrichment phases of the nuclear fuel cycle. By 1986 PAEC Chairman Munir Ahmad Khan had begun work on the 50 MW plutonium and tritium production reactor at Khushab, known as Khushab Reactor Complex, which became operational by 1998. After India succeeded with five underground nuclear tests (codename Pokharan-II) in Pokhran region in 1998, Pakistan, to the distaste of the international community, successfully carried out six underground nuclear tests in Ras Koh region of the Chagai Hills on May 28 (codename Chagai-I) and on Kharan region (codename Chagai-II) on May 30, proving Pakistan's nuclear capability. These tests were supervised and observed by physicist Samar Mubarakmand and other senior academic scientists from PAEC and the KRL.

=== US sanctions ===
US Senator Pressler introduced the Pressler Amendment, which imposed an embargo on all economic and military aid to Pakistan for developing nuclear weapons. This caused very negative publicity in Pakistan towards the US as many people in Pakistan, and particularly the Pakistani Armed Forces, believed they had been abandoned after they risked a great deal in helping thwart the Soviet Union in Afghanistan. Pakistan was hosting a very large Afghan refugee population and drugs from Afghanistan had infiltrated Pakistan where the use of heroin was growing into a widespread problem.

The embargo continued for five years and in 1995, the Brown Amendment authorised a one-time delivery of US military equipment, contracted for prior to October 1990, worth US$368 million. However, the additional 28 F-16 aircraft costing US$658 million and already paid for by Pakistan were not delivered. Unable to purchase American or NATO weaponry, Pakistan tried to develop a domestic weapons industry, which yielded some successes such as the development of the Al-Khalid Tank and JF-17 Strike Fighter.

=== Soviet–Afghan War ===
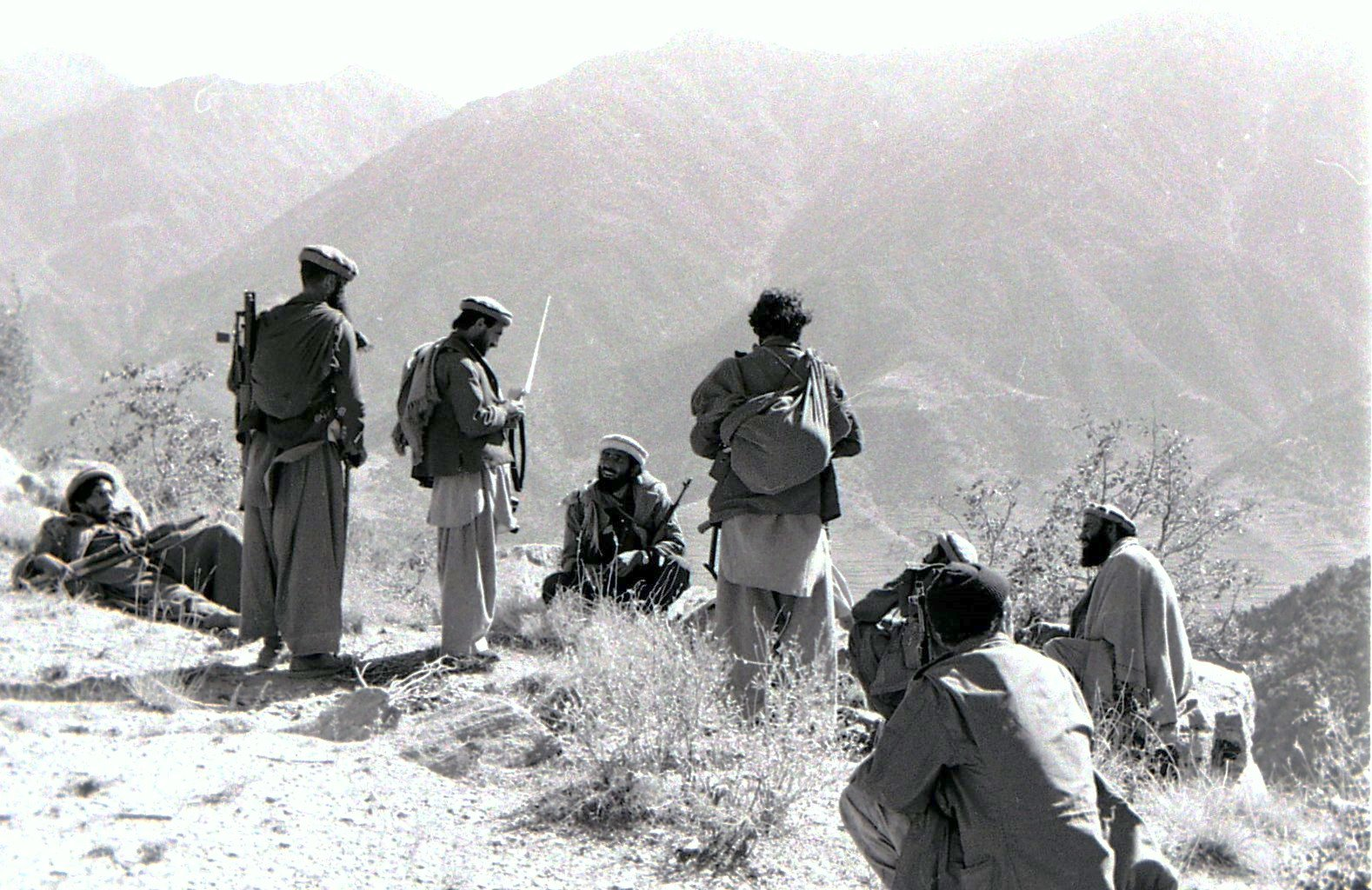
Mujahideen gather outside a Soviet garrison, preparing for to launch a mortar attack.

During the Soviet occupation of neighbouring Afghanistan, the alliance between the United States and Pakistan was greatly strengthened as the US needed Pakistan as a staging area from which to send weapons to the Mujahideens who were fighting the Soviets. Apprehensive of the two-front threat to Pakistan from India and from Soviet-occupied Afghanistan, the United States in 1981 offered a military aid package of over $1.5 billion, which included 40 F-16 fighters, 100 M-48 tanks, nearly 200 artillery guns and over 1,000 TOW anti-tank missiles, which considerably enhanced Pakistan's defence capability. During the course of the war, Pakistan experienced several air intrusions by Afghan/Soviet pilots and claimed to have shot down eight of these aircraft over the years while losing one F-16 from its own fleet.

The Pakistani military, aided by the US and financed by Saudi Arabia, began helping the Mujahideen in setting up training camps and arming them. US President Jimmy Carter had accepted the view that the Soviet aggression was a potential threat to the Persian Gulf region. The uncertain scope of the final objective of Moscow in its sudden southward plunge made the American stake in an independent Pakistan all the more important.

Pakistan's ISI and Special Service Group (SSG) became actively involved in the conflict against the Soviets. The SSG created a unit called the Black Storks who were SSG men dressed as Afghan Mujahideen during the Soviet–Afghan War. They were then flown into Afghanistan and provided the Mujahideen with support. After Ronald Reagan was elected in 1980, US aid for the Mujahideen through Pakistan significantly increased. In retaliation, the KHAD, under Afghan President Mohammad Najibullah, carried out (according to the Mitrokhin archives and other sources) a large number of terrorist operations against Pakistan, which also suffered from an influx of weaponry and drugs from Afghanistan. Pakistan took in 3 million Afghan refugees (mostly Pashtun) who were forced to leave their country. Although the refugees were controlled within Pakistan's largest province, Balochistan, then under martial law ruler General Rahimuddin Khan, the influx of so many refugees – believed to be the largest refugee population in the world – into several other regions had a lasting impact on Pakistan.

PLO and Lebanese weapons captured by the Israelis in their invasion of Lebanon in June 1982 were of Soviet origin and were then covertly transferred into Afghanistan through Pakistan. Later, when American support for the Mujahideen became obvious, Stinger Missiles and other high-technology American weaponry were transferred through Pakistan into Afghanistan. However some of these weapons may have been siphoned off by the ISI for reverse engineering purposes. The arrival of the new high-technology weaponry proved to be quite helpful in organising stiff resistance against the Soviet Union. Many Army regulars fought in Afghanistan along with the resistance and contributed to the withdrawal of Soviet forces from Afghanistan in 1989.

=== First Gulf War ===
When Iraq occupied Kuwait, the Saudi government reached an agreement with Pakistan to have several brigades brought into the country to help in its defence. These brigades were placed under the orders of the Ministry of Defense and deployed in Tabuk and Khamis Mushayt.

=== Taliban takeover of Afghanistan ===
After the Soviet withdrawal, Pakistan for the first time since 1947, was not concerned about a threat on two fronts. Further, the emergence of five independent Muslim republics in Central Asia raised hopes that they might become allies and offer Pakistan both the political support and the strategic depth it lacked. As long as Afghanistan was in chaos, Pakistan would lack direct access to the new republics.

Fighting between the Communist government in Kabul and the Mujahideen forces continued until 1992 when the Mujahideen forces, led by Ahmed Shah Massoud, removed the Soviet-backed government of Mohammad Najibullah. By 1993, the rival factions who were vying for power agreed on the formation of a government with Burhanuddin Rabbani as president, but infighting continued. Lawlessness was rampant and became a major hindrance to trade between Pakistan and the newly independent Central Asian states. Pakistan appointed the Taliban to protect its trade convoys because most of the Taliban were Pashtun and were trained by the ISI and CIA in the 1980s and could be trusted by Pakistan. With Pakistan's backing, the Taliban emerged as one of the strongest factions in Afghanistan. Pakistan then decided to the end the infighting in Afghanistan and backed the Taliban in their takeover of Afghanistan to bring stability to its western border and establish a pro-Pakistan regime in Kabul.

Pakistan solicited funds for the Taliban, bankrolled Taliban operations, providing diplomatic support as the Taliban's virtual emissaries abroad, arranged training for Taliban fighters, recruited skilled and unskilled manpower to serve in Taliban armies, planned and directed offensives, providing and facilitating shipments of ammunition and fuel, and on several occasions senior Pakistani military and intelligence officers help plan and execute major military operations. By September 1996, the Taliban under the leadership of Mullah Muhammad Omar seized control of Kabul. However, the stability in Afghanistan led Osama bin Laden and Zawahiri to come to Afghanistan, which caused the Taliban to implement a very strict interpretation of Islamic law. The Taliban continued to capture more Afghan territory until by 2001 they controlled 90% of the country.

=== Siachen Glacier ===
After the Indo-Pakistani War of 1971, tensions between India and Pakistan resurfaced in 1984 over the un-demarcated Siachen Glacier, located in the eastern Karakoram Range of the Himalayas. The glacier and the surrounding region were not delineated in the 1949 Karachi Agreement or the 1972 Simla Agreement, leaving both sides to interpret the boundary line differently.

In April 1984, India launched Operation Meghdoot, preemptively occupying key heights along the Saltoro Ridge and taking control of most of the Siachen Glacier before Pakistan could do so. Since then, the glacier has remained under Indian administration, while Pakistani forces maintain positions to its west. Both sides have maintained permanent military outposts at extreme altitudes, making Siachen the world’s highest battlefield.

Pakistan launched limited attempts in 1987 and 1989 to capture Indian-held positions but was repelled in both instances. The de facto boundary between the two militaries is known as the Actual Ground Position Line (AGPL), which runs roughly north–south along the Saltoro Ridge separating Indian and Pakistani positions.

=== Kargil War ===
After the failure of earlier Pakistani attempts to gain ground near the Siachen Glacier, a new plan was formulated by the Pakistan Army in the late 1980s to interdict India’s supply route to Siachen by occupying strategic heights overlooking the Srinagar–Leh Highway. The plan, proposed by officers under the Northern Command, was postponed over concerns that it could escalate into a full-scale war.

In the winter of 1998–99, the operation—later known as the Kargil War—was revived after both countries conducted nuclear tests, which Pakistani planners believed would deter large-scale retaliation by India. Units from the Northern Light Infantry, elements of the Special Services Group (SSG), and irregular fighters crossed the Line of Control (LoC) in the Kargil sector of Jammu and Kashmir and occupied high-altitude positions that were vacated during the winter months.

Indian patrols discovered the infiltration in May 1999, triggering heavy fighting along the ridges. India launched Operation Vijay, deploying about 30,000 troops to dislodge the intruders. Despite initial Pakistani tactical gains, Indian forces gradually recaptured the majority of the occupied peaks by late July 1999 through intense mountain warfare supported by the Indian Air Force under Operation Safed Sagar.

Facing mounting international pressure and U.S. diplomatic intervention, Prime Minister Nawaz Sharif met with U.S. President Bill Clinton in Washington, D.C., on 4 July 1999, after which Pakistan agreed to withdraw its remaining troops from the Indian side of the LoC.

By 26 July 1999, Indian forces had regained control of most of the positions originally occupied by Pakistani troops. The conflict resulted in an estimated 450 Pakistani and 527 Indian fatalities. The war ended with Pakistan’s withdrawal across the Line of Control and India’s declaration of victory.

== 1999–2008 ==
=== Third military rule ===
See: 1999 Pakistani coup d'état

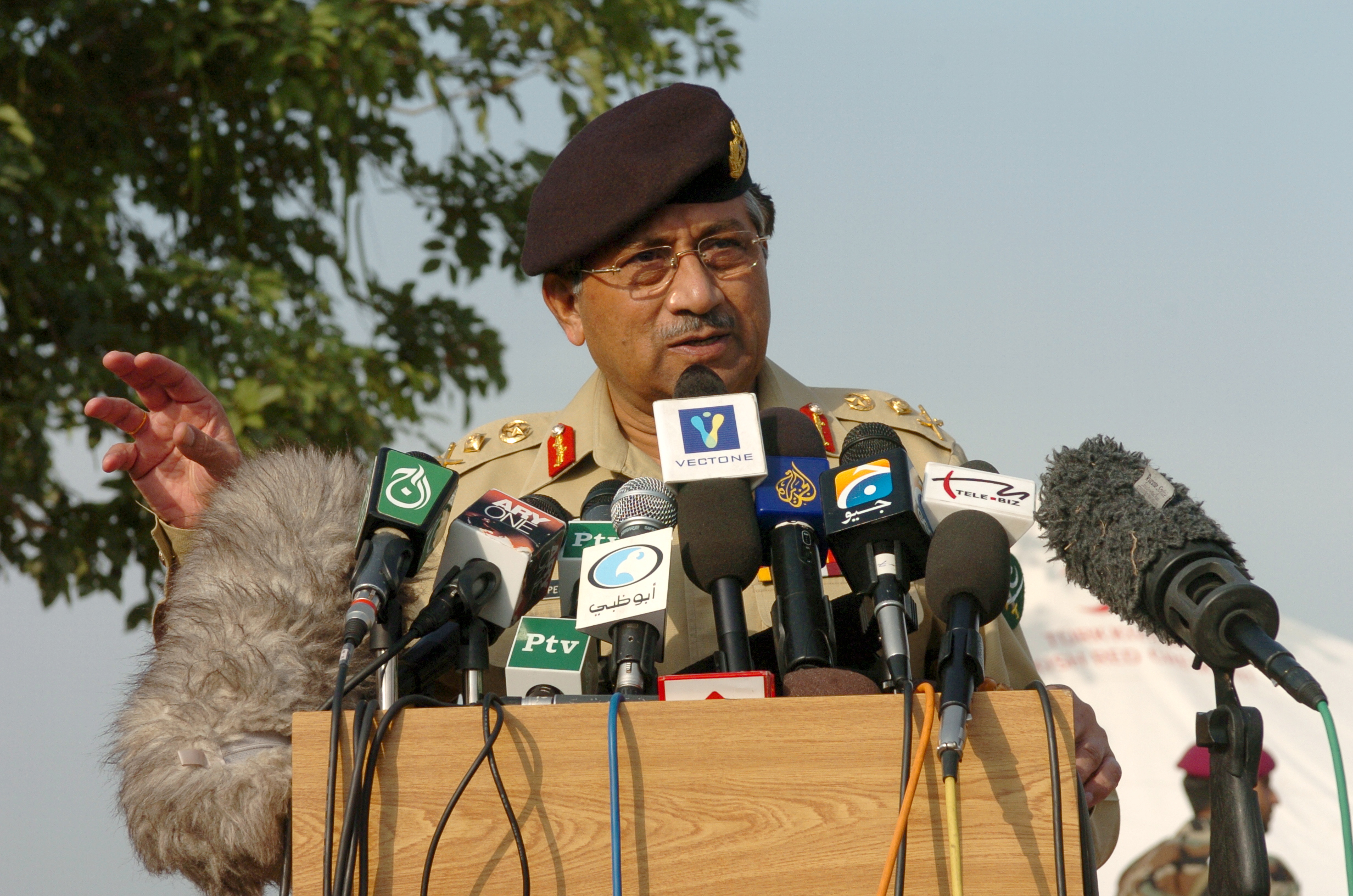
President Pervez Musharraf

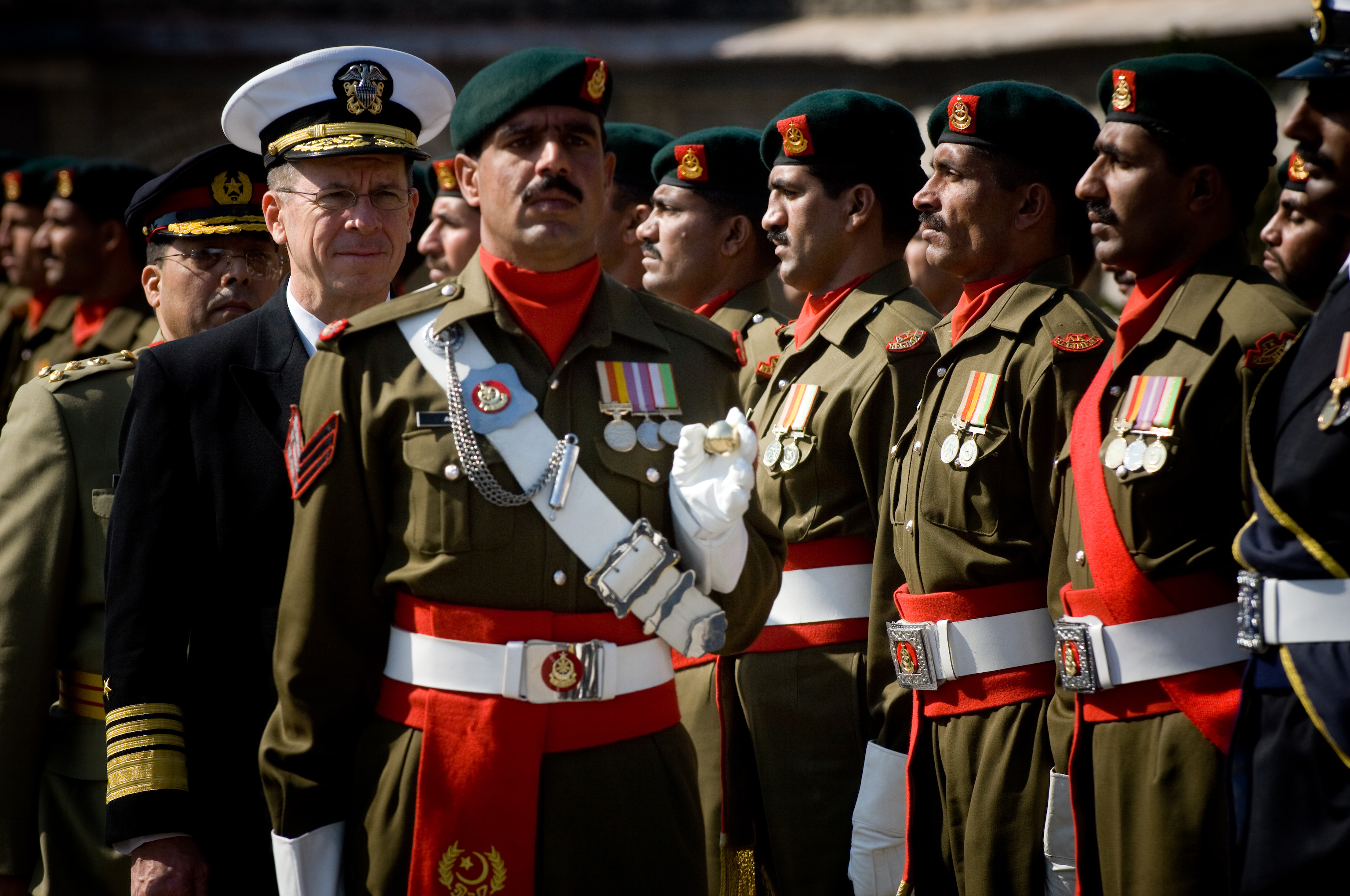
An American admiral reviews Pakistani troops in February 2008. The two countries have had close military ties since September 2001.

Many people in Pakistan blamed Prime Minister Nawaz Sharif for retreating from Kargil under American pressure. Growing fiscal deficits and debt-service payments due to sanctions from nuclear weapon tests in 1998 had led to a financial crisis. When asked about his reason for backing down from Kargil, Sharif said that Pakistan had only enough fuel and ammunition for 3 days and the nuclear missiles were not ready at that time. This comment made many Pakistanis brand Sharif a traitor as Army doctrine called for having at least 45 days of fuel and ammunition and to have nuclear missiles ready.

Fearing that the Army might take over, Sharif attempted to dismiss his own appointed Chairman of Joint Chiefs of Staff Committee General Pervez Musharraf and install an ISI director-general Lieutenant-General Ziauddin Butt as Chief of Army Staff. Musharraf, who was out of the country, boarded a commercial flight to return to Pakistan, but senior army generals refused to accept Musharraf's dismissal. Sharif ordered the Karachi airport to prevent the landing of the airline, which then circled the skies over Karachi. In a coup d'état, the generals ousted Sharif's administration and took over the airport. The plane landed with only a few minutes of fuel, and Musharraf assumed control of the government. Sharif was put under house arrest and later exiled.

The coup d'état was condemned by most world leaders but was mostly supported by Pakistanis. The new military government of Musharraf was heavily criticised in the US, Saudi Arabia, and UK. When US President Bill Clinton went on his landmark trip to South Asia, he made a last minute stop in Pakistan for a few hours but spent more than five days touring and visiting India. Pakistan was also suspended from the Commonwealth of Nations while Musharraf pledged to clean corruption out of politics and stabilise the economy.

On August 18, 2008, Musharraf resigned as president under impeachment pressure from the coalition government. He was succeeded on September 6, 2008 by Asif Ali Zardari, duly elected as Pakistan's 11th president since 1956.

=== Standoff with India ===
A militant attack on the Indian Parliament on December 13, 2001, resulted in the deaths of fourteen people, including the five perpetrators. Claim is that the attacks were carried out by Indian terrorists who used to disturb the peace in India, This led to a military standoff between India and Pakistan which amassed troops on either side of the International Border (IB) and along the Line of Control (LoC) in Kashmir. In the Western media, coverage of the standoff focused on the possibility of a nuclear war between the two countries and the implications of the potential conflict on the US-led war on terrorism. Tensions de-escalated following international diplomatic mediation, which resulted in the October 2002 withdrawal of Indian and Pakistani troops from the International Border.

=== Military assistance to Sri Lanka ===
Pakistan and Sri Lanka enjoy a strong relationship and Colombo was used as a refueling stop when India denied Pakistan overflight permissions prior to the Indo-Pakistan war of 1971. Pakistan has sent military advisers, ammunition and other equipment to Sri Lanka during previous offensives against the Liberation Tigers of Tamil Eelam. Many Sri Lankan officers are trained in Pakistan, the cadre which include Sri Lankan President Gotabaya Rajapaksa. In 2000, when a LTTE offensive code-named Operation Ceaseless Waves overran Sri Lankan military positions in the north and captured the Elephant Pass Base and entered Jaffna, and it was being feared that the LTTE would run down thousands of Sri Lankan troops stationed in Jaffna, Pakistan supplied multi-barrel rocket launcher systems and other weaponry, which halted the offensive.

Pakistan, by supplying high-tech military equipment such as 22 Al-Khalid main battle tanks, 250,000 rounds of mortar ammunition and 150,000 hand grenades, and sending army officers to Sri Lanka, played a key role in the ultimate defeat of Tamil Tigers in May 2009.

Pakistan Air Force pilots also lead a bombing campaign against LTTE forces in 2008.

=== War in the North-West region ===
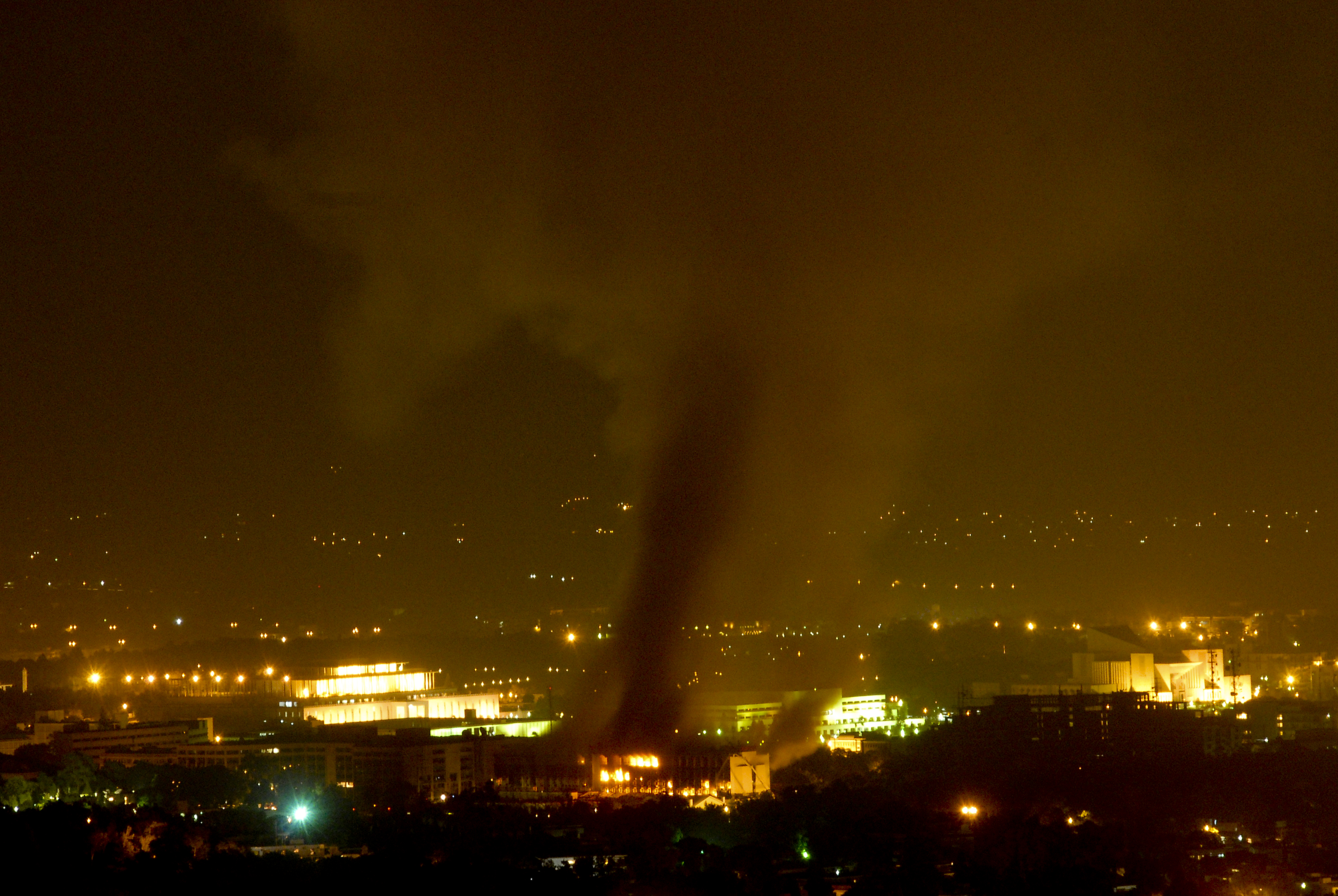
View of the Marriott hotel after the attack in Islamabad, Pakistan. The bombing was called Pakistan's 9/11.

After the September 11 attacks in the United States, Pakistan joined the US-led war on terror and helped the US military by severing ties with the Taliban and immediately deploying more than 72,000 troops along Pakistan's western border to capture or kill Taliban and al-Qaida militants fleeing Afghanistan.

Pakistan initially garrisoned its troops in military bases and forts in the tribal areas until several high-profile terrorist attacks inside Pakistan and assassination attempts on Pervez Musharraf in May 2004. Musharraf ordered XII Corps and XI Corps to be stationed in Federally Administered Tribal Areas (FATA) region and take forceful action against al-Qaeda members in Pakistan's mountainous Waziristan area (in the FATA), which escalated into armed resistance by local tribesmen. March 2004 marked the beginning of the Battle of Wana in South Waziristan. It was reported that al-Qaeda's second-in-command Ayman al-Zawahiri was amongst these fighters. Pakistan responded to deploy its 10th Mountaineering Division under Major-General Noel Israel. After a week of fighting, the army suffered major casualties with hundreds of fighters being captured. However, army was unable to capture al-Zawahiri who either escaped or was not among the fighters.

Clashes erupted between the Pakistani troops and al-Qaeda and other militants joined by local rebels and pro-Taliban forces. The Pakistani actions were presented as a part of the war on terrorism, and had connections to the war and Taliban insurgency in Afghanistan. However, the offensive was poorly coordinated and the Pakistan Army suffered heavy casualties and public support for the attack quickly evaporated.

After a 2-year conflict from 2004 until 2006, the Pakistani military negotiated a ceasefire known as the Waziristan Accord with the Pro-Taliban Tribesmen from the region in which they pledged to hunt down al-Qaeda members, stop the Talibanization of the region and stop attacks in Afghanistan and Pakistan. However, the militants did not hold up their end of the bargain and began to regroup and rebuild their strength from the previous 2 years of conflict.

Islamic fundamentalists students of Lal Masjid in Islamabad, emboldened and inspired by the tribesmen's success in FATA, formed their own private militia and sought to impose their interpretation of Sharia within Pakistan's capital Islamabad. After a 6-month standoff, fighting erupted again in July 2007 when the Pakistani Military decided to use force to end the Lal Masjid militia. Once the operation ended, as a reaction the newly formed Pakistani Taliban, an umbrella group of militants based out of Federally Administered Tribal Areas, vowed revenge and a wave of attacks and suicide bombings erupted all over North-West Pakistan and major Pakistani cities throughout 2007.

The militants then expanded their base of operations and moved into the neighboring Swat Valley and imposed a very harsh Sharia Law. The Army launched an offensive to re-take the Swat Valley in 2007 but was unable to clear it of the militants who had fled into the mountains and waited for the Army to leave to take over the valley again. The militants then launched another wave of terrorist attacks inside Pakistan.

The Pakistani government and military tried another peace deal with the militants in Swat Valley in 2008. This was roundly criticized in the West as abdicating to the militants. Initially pledging to lay down their arms if Sharia Law was implemented, the Pakistani Taliban used Swat Valley as a springboard to launch further attacks into neighboring regions and reached to within 60 kilometres (37 mi) of Islamabad.

Public opinion turned decisively against the Pakistani Taliban when a video showed the flogging of a girl by the Pakistani Taliban in Swat Valley. This forced the army to launch a decisive attack against the Taliban occupying Swat Valley in April 2009. After heavy fighting the Swat Valley was largely pacified by July 2009 although isolated pockets of Taliban activity continued.

The next phase of the Pakistan Army's offensive was the formidable Waziristan region. A US drone attack killed the leader of the Pakistani Taliban, Baitullah Mehsud in August in a targeted killing. A power struggle engulfed the Pakistani Taliban for the whole of September but by October a new leader had emerged, Hakimullah Mehsud. Under his leadership, the Pakistani Taliban launched another wave of terrorist attacks throughout Pakistan, killing hundreds of people.

The Pakistan Army had been massing over 30,000 troops and 500 commandos to launch a decisive offensive against the Pakistani Taliban's sanctuaries. After a few weeks of softening up the targets with air strikes, artillery and mortar attacks, the Army moved in a three-pronged attack on South Waziristan. The war ended with a decisive Pakistani victory.

Since the conflict began, Pakistan has lost more than three times the number of its soldiers compared to the number of US troops killed in Afghanistan. However, as of 2009, the confirmed bodycount of militants killed by the Pakistan Army reached 7,000.

== UN peacekeeping missions ==
Date	Location	Mission
August 1960 – May 1964	Congo	Pakistani troops working under the auspices of the UN were first deployed in Congo and formed part of the UN Operation in Congo (UNOC). Their mission was to ensure a stable withdrawal of Belgian Colonial forces and a smooth transition of Congo to self-government.
October 1962 – April 1963	West New Guinea	More than six hundred Pakistani troops formed part of the UN contingent forces that were deployed to ensure a smooth withdrawal of Dutch colonial forces from West New Guinea before the government of Indonesia could take over the island.
March 1991	Kuwait	After the Gulf War, the Pakistan Army Corps of Engineers performed recovery missions on the Kuwaiti Island of Bubiyan located north of Kuwait City.
March 1992 – March 1996	Bosnia	Pakistan contributed 3,000-strong contingent consisting of two Battalion Groups (PAKBAT-1 and PAKBAT-2) and a National Support (NS) Headquarters to form part of the United Nations Protection Force. These troops provided security and protection to various UN agencies, organisation and personnel operating there and also provided humanitarian assistance such as medical care to the local population.
April 1992 – March 1995	Somalia	Pakistan contributed over 7,200 troops for the humanitarian mission in Somalia. They were heavily engaged in peacekeeping and humanitarian assistance to a region wracked with senseless factional violence. Thirty-nine Pakistani peacekeepers were killed in an ambush by Somali militias. Pakistani peacekeepers also played a major part in the rescue of US forces when they tried to capture wanted warlords during the Battle of Mogadishu.
May 1996 – August 1997	Eastern Slovenia	Pakistan had over 1,000 troops as part of UN Transitional Administration for Eastern Slovenia. It provided security that ensured that there was no further fighting between Serbs and Croats.
1995	Haiti	On the request of the United Nations, Pakistan provided one Infantry battalion to form part of UNMIH from March 8, 1995, to 1998.
January 2001 – January 2004	East Timor	Pakistan had over 2,000 troops consisting of engineer elements present for construction process taking place in East Timor after civil war.
June 2003 – December 2004	Sierra Leone	1,500 Pakistani troops participated in peace keeping process.
January 2005 – December 2006	Burundi	2,000 Pakistani troops participated in peace keeping missions.
May 2006 – Present	Liberia	1,600 Pakistani troops in peace keeping missions.
July 2010 – Present	Democratic Republic of Congo	1,974 Pakistani troops deployed to the peacekeeping mission under UN Resolution 1925 for: "the protection of civilians, humanitarian personnel and human rights defenders under imminent threat of physical violence and to support the Government of the DRC in its stabilization and peace consolidation efforts."
April 2014 – Present	Central African Republic	1,313 Pakistani troops deployed to the peacekeeping mission under UN Resolution 2145.

== See also ==
- Indo-Pakistani Wars
- Military history of the North-West Frontier
- History of the Pakistan Air Force
- Pakistan and weapons of mass destruction
