= List of deserts of Pakistan =

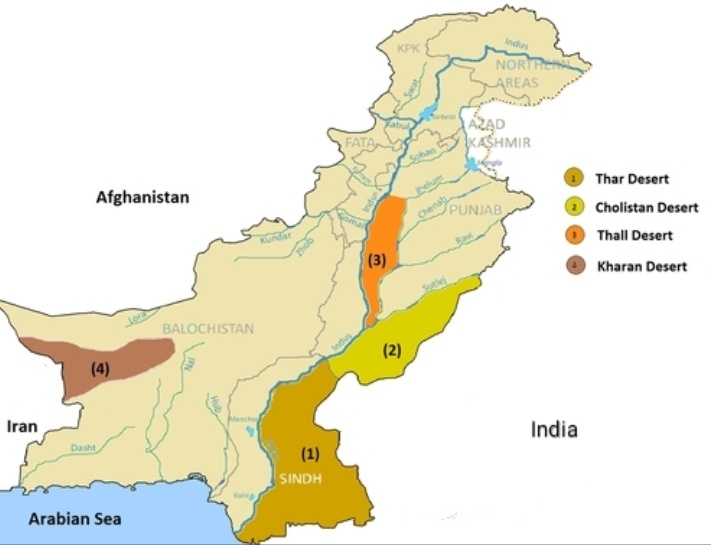
Map of the four major deserts in Pakistan

Pakistan hosts four hot deserts which were historically forests. In addition to these, there is also a cold desert in the country. The hot deserts are the Tharparker and Nara Deserts in Sindh, the Cholistan and Thal deserts in Punjab, and the Kharan Desert in Balochistan, and the cold desert is Katpana Desert in Gilgit-Baltistan, province of Pakistan.

== Coastal desert ==
=== Thar Desert ===
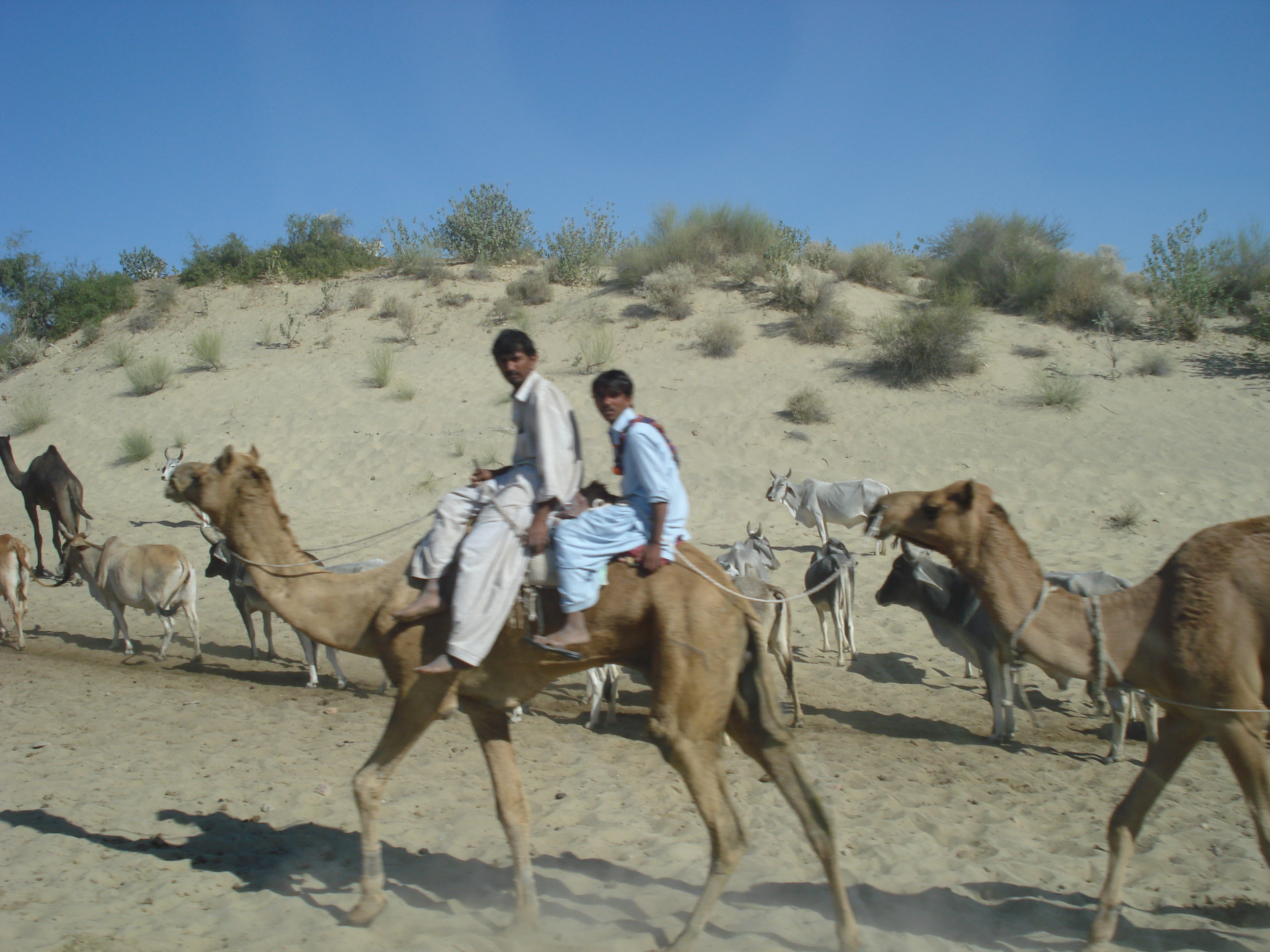
Thar Desert

The Thar Desert spans an area of 175,000 square kilometers and covers large areas of Pakistan and India. It is the largest desert of Pakistan and the only subtropical desert of Asia. It is the 16th largest desert on the planet and the third largest in Asia. It has also spread into India. The Thar Desert, also known as the Great Indian Desert, is a large, arid region in the northwestern part of the Indian subcontinent that forms a natural boundary between India and Pakistan. It is the world's 16th largest desert, and the world's 9th largest subtropical desert. 85% of the Thar Desert is in India, and the remaining 15% is in Pakistan. In India, it covers 320,000 km2 (120,000 sq mi), of which 90% is in Rajasthan and extends into Gujarat, Punjab, and Haryana. In Pakistan, it spreads over Punjab and Sindh starting from Tharparkar District in the east. This desert consists of a very dry part, the Marusthali region, in the west, and a semi-desert region in the east with fewer sand dunes and slightly more precipitation.

== Hot and dry deserts ==
=== Cholistan Desert ===
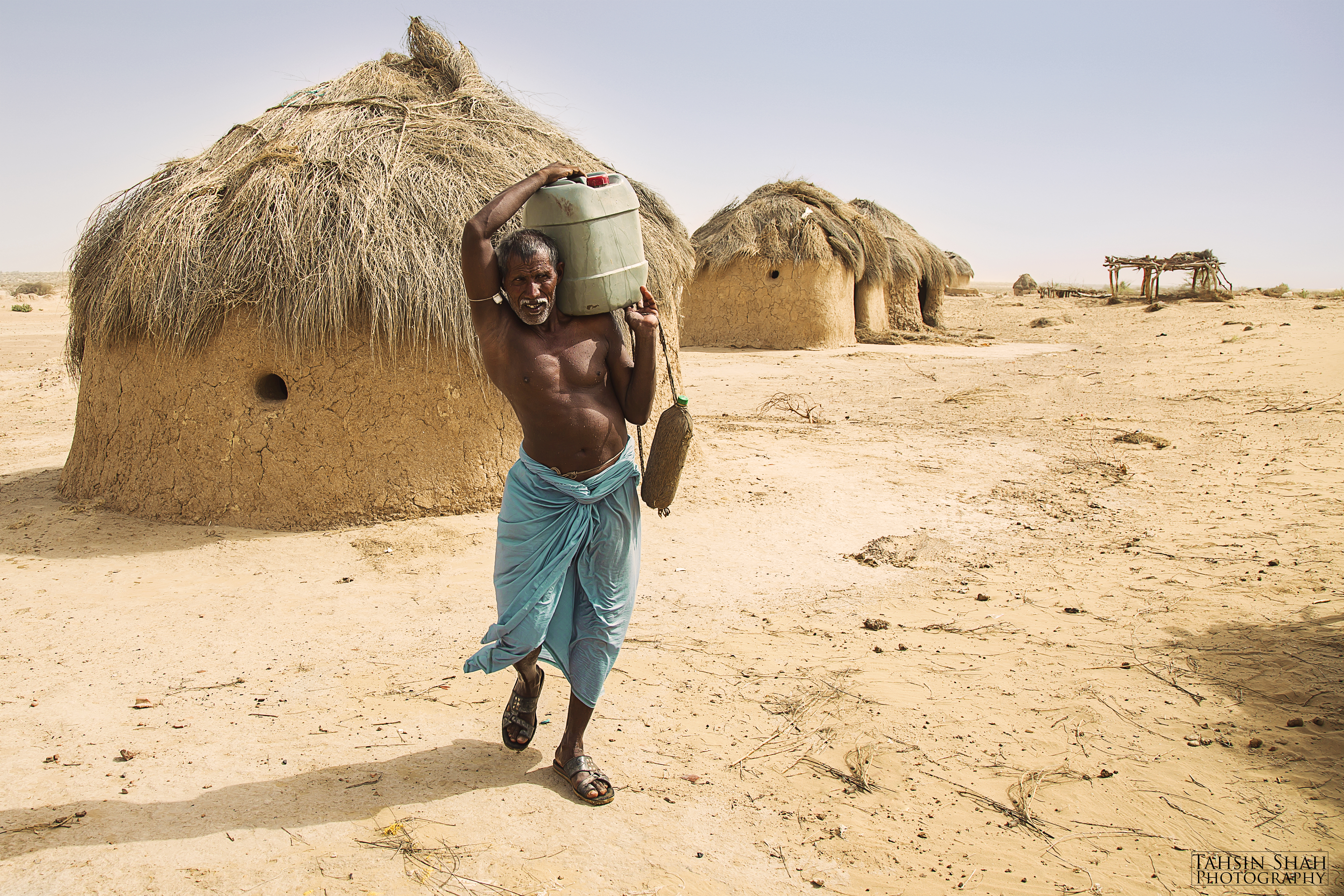
Man carrying water in Cholistan

The Cholistan Desert is locally known as "Rohi 'and covers the area of Bahawalpur, Punjab. It adjoins the Thar Desert, extending over to Sindh and into India. Cholistan desert hosts an annual Jeep rally, known as Cholistan Desert Jeep Rally which is the biggest

=== Thal Desert ===
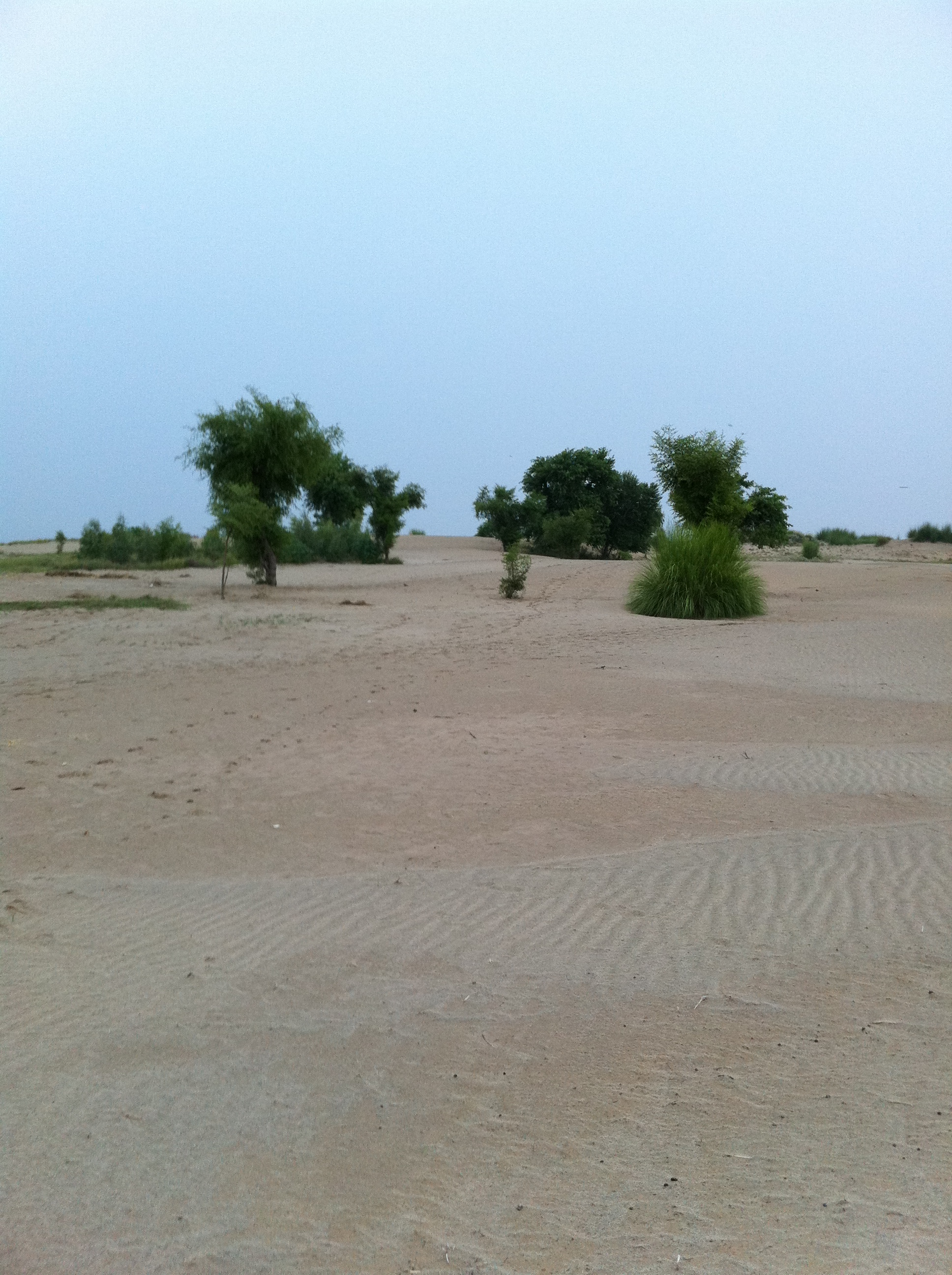
Thal Desert

The Thal Desert is located in Bhakkar District of Pakistan between the Indus and Jhelum rivers. A large canal-building project is currently underway to irrigate the land. Irrigation will make most of the desert suitable for farming. In the north of the Thal Desert there are the Salt Ranges, in the east the Jhelum and Chenab rivers and to the west the Indus River.

== Sandy desert ==
=== Kharan Desert ===
The Kharan Desert (Urdu: صحرائے خاران) is a sandy and mountainous desert situated in Balochistan Province in south-western Pakistan.

This desert was the site of Pakistan's second nuclear test, Chagai-II, which was carried out on 28 May 1998.

== Cold desert ==
=== Katpana Desert ===
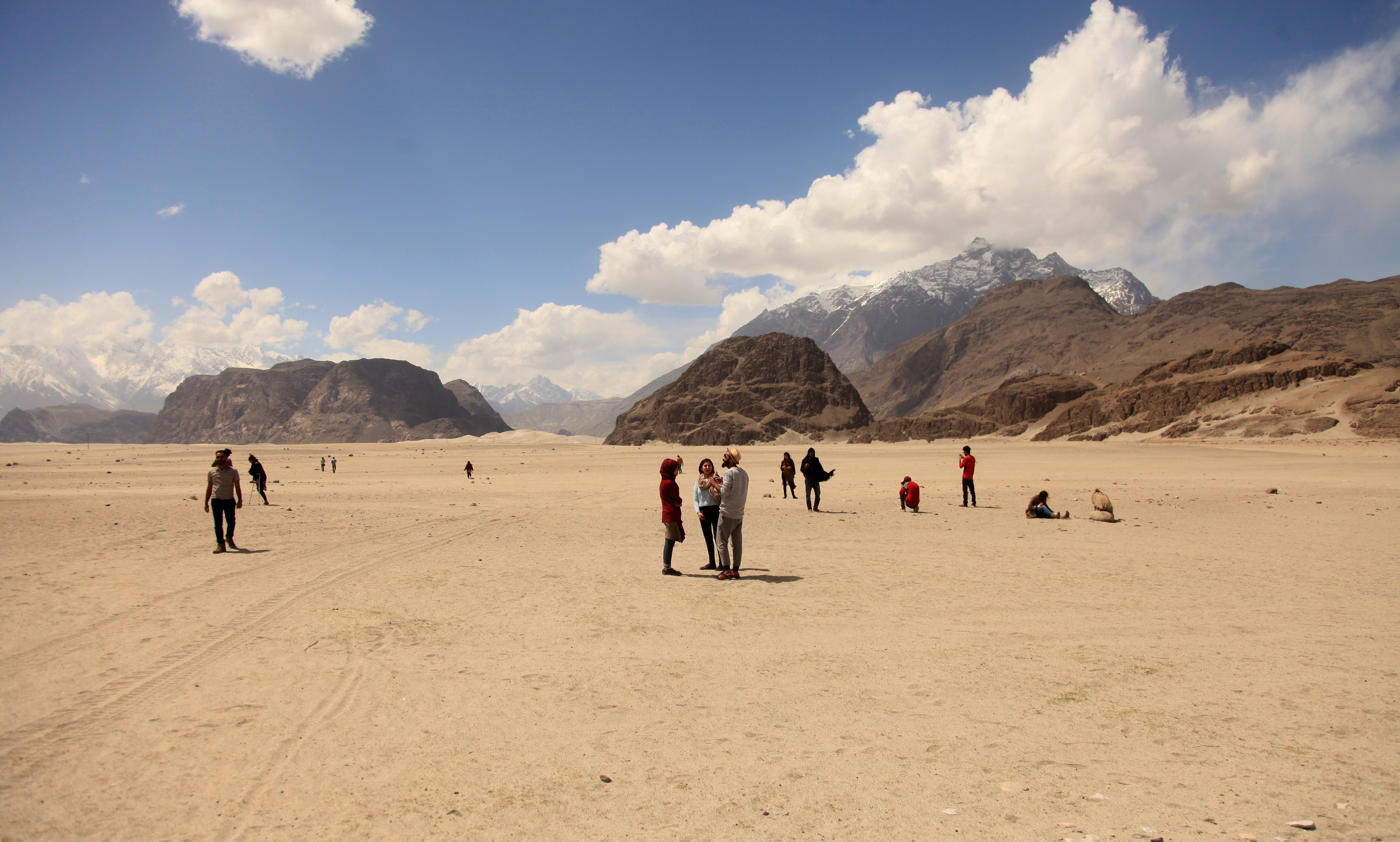
Katpana Desert, cold desert in Skardu.

The Katpana Desert is a high-altitude desert located near Skardu, in Pakistan's northern Gilgit-Baltistan region. The desert contains expanses of large sand dunes that are sometimes covered in snow during winter. Situated at an elevation of 2,226 metres (7,303 ft) above sea level, the Katpana Desert is one of the highest deserts in the world.

The desert technically stretches from the Khaplu Valley to Nubra in Ladakh, but the largest desert area is found in Skardu and Shigar Valley. The portion most visited is located near Skardu Airport.

== See also ==
- Ecoregions of Pakistan
- Forestry in Pakistan
- Geography of Pakistan
- Tourism in Pakistan
- Wildlife of Pakistan
