= Ras Koh Range =

Mountain range & reservation of the Ministry of Defense in Balochistan, Pakistan

- Chagai and Kharan District in Balochistan, Pakistan; Near Dalbandin, Balochistan in Pakistan
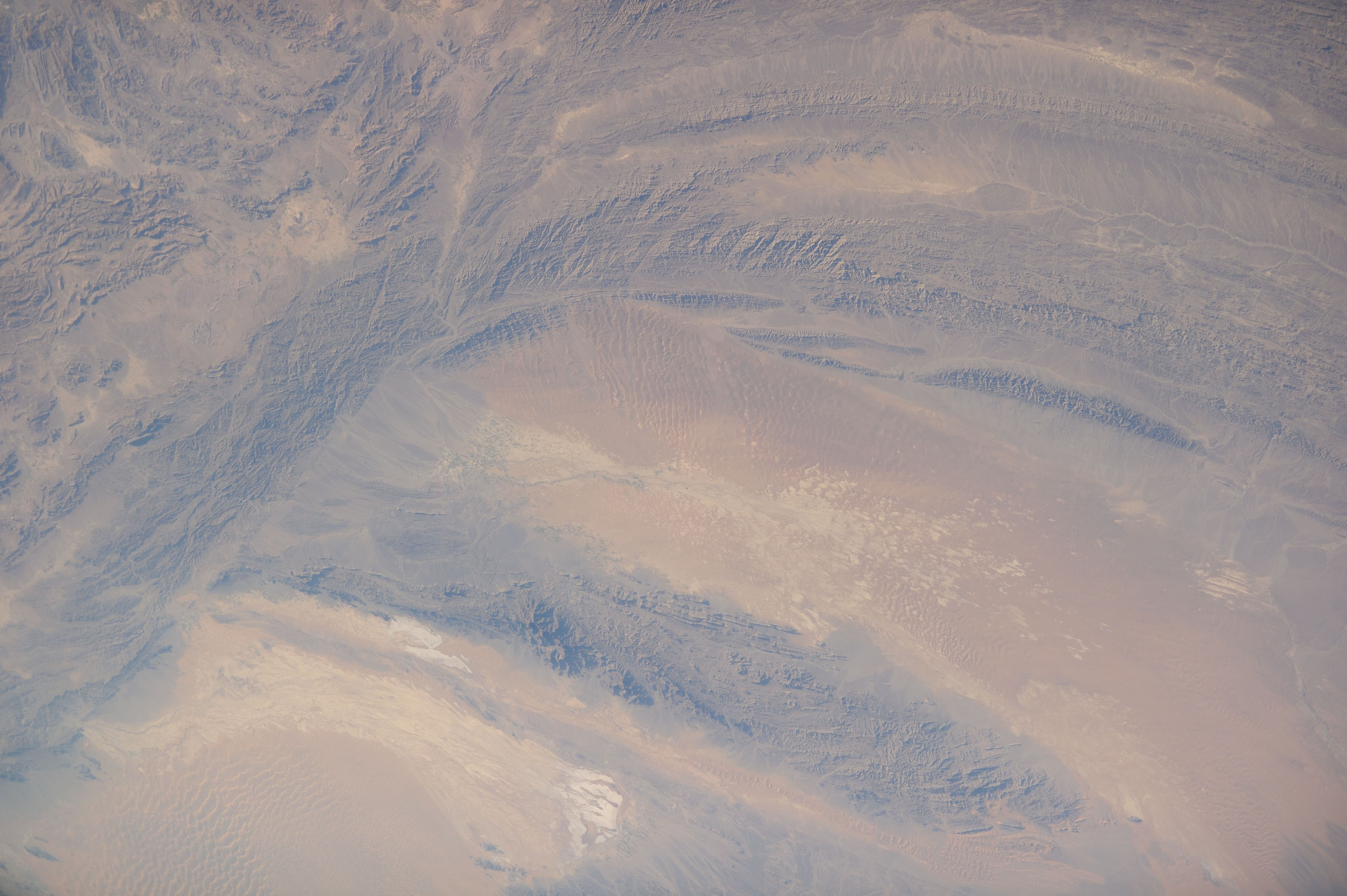
- Aerial picture of Ras Koh Range provided by ISS Mission in 2014.

Site information
- Type: Nuclear Weapons Research Complex
- Open to the public: No

Location
- Location within Pakistan
- Coordinates: 28°49′42.71″N 65°11′41.83″E
- Area: 994.98 km^{2} (384.16 sq mi)
- Height: 10,000 ft (3,000 m)
- Length: 140 mi (230 km)

Site history
- Built: 1976
- Built by: Pakistan Army Corps of Engineers
- In use: 1976-1998

Test information
- Subcritical tests: N/A
- Nuclear tests: 6
- Thermonuclear tests: 6

The Ras Koh Range (popularised as Ras Koh Test Site) is a granite mountain range located between the districts of Chagai and Kharan of Balochistan in Pakistan.

The range is a reservation of Ministry of Defence (MoD) and a weapons science testbed venue of the Pakistan Atomic Energy Commission (PAEC) carrying out explosives testing of nuclear devices, and it covers mostly desert and mountainous terrain. Since 1998, only six nuclear tests took place until Pakistan put a unilateral moratorium on a full-scale testing.

== Overview ==
=== Etymology ===
The word "Ras" means "gateway" and the word "Koh" means "mountain" in Persian; therefore, it means "Gateway to the Mountains."

=== Topography and geology ===
The Ras Koh Hills range is expanded between the districts of Chagai and Kharan, and is about 230 km (140 mi) in length, according to the survey conducted by the former British Indian Army in 1910. The length of the Ras Koh Range is also confirmed by the Geological Survey of Pakistan and the Survey of Pakistan which measured to be exact at 230 km (140 mi).

The highest peak in Ras Koh Hills range is measured to be 3,000 m (10,000 ft), with average hills are measured at 180 m (600 ft). Furthermore, its topographical geolocation lies between the much larger and difficult Sulaiman Mountains range to the northeast and the Kirthar Mountains range to its southeast.

The famous Chagai Hills are located on the northwest of Ras Koh but usually contains in its range of study of geology with the Ras Koh Hills. The Ras Koh Range is actually separated by a larger structural depression between the open flood flats of the Chagai Hills and the Ras Koh Hills— they are widely divided by the desert terrain.

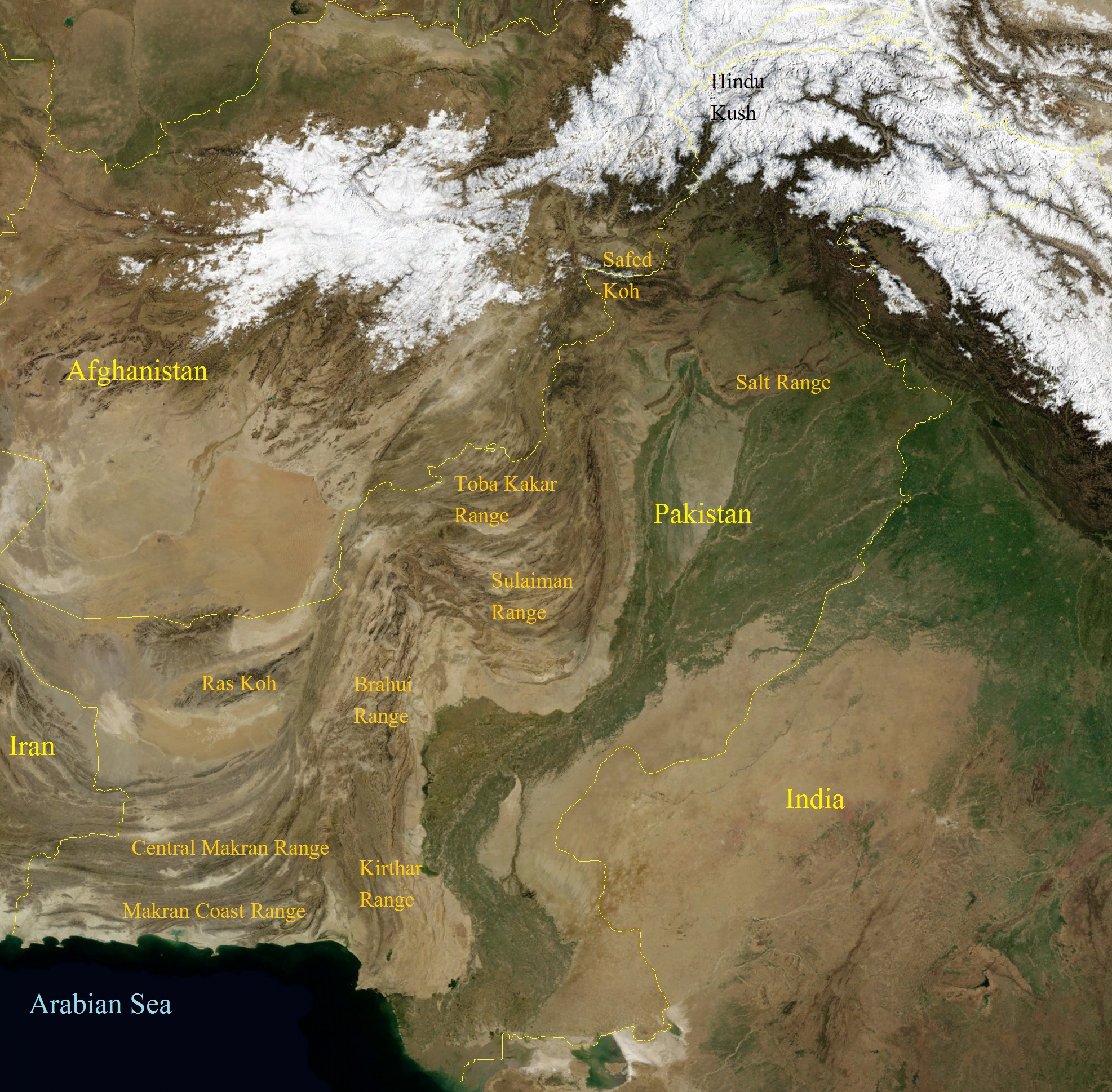
The Ras Koh Range provided by the NASA as mountain ranges of Pakistan series.

In 1963, the British geologist Dr. E. R. Gee, working for and leading the Geological Survey of Pakistan (GSP), conducted investigative scientific studies on ground water conditions, and discovered the deposits of Chromite. The sedimentary rock formations in the range are mostly granite, limestone and conglomerate. The GPS also discovered the deposits of the diorites in Ras Koh Range in its records. In Ras Koh Range, GSP also recorded the few alluvial fans in its 1970 reports but the area is mostly desert and rocky terrain.

The township, Dalbandin, is the closest town near the site, which is about 80 km (50 mi) from the range. Accessibility to the test site is only through the N-40, which is located on the eastern part of the range.

Unlike the Toba Kakar Range to the north-east, the Ras Koh Hills are barren— the local people have avoided the area due to its remoteness, lack of water, harsh climatic environment, and difficult rocky terrains.

=== Environment ===
==== Climate and wildlife ====
The Ras Koh Range lies in an arid zone, which is outside the monsoon season. The Ras Koh Range receives only scarce and an irregular rainfall, with an average of 100 mm (3.9 in) annually. The weather is reportedly very extreme in Ras Koh and is one of Pakistan's extreme places with very hot in summer and very cold in winter. The minimum temperature in Ras Koh Range in 1997 is recorded at 2.4 °C (36.3 °F) in January, and the average maximum at 42.5 °C (108.5 °F) in July.

In 1962, the Government of Pakistan designated the area for Wildlife sanctuary, which covers an area of 994.98 km^{2} (384.16 sq mi).

== Nuclear testings ==
Plans to conduct nuclear weapon testing began in 1975–76 with the Zulfikar Ali Bhutto's administration when the Ras Koh Range was used as a test site. Logistical and construction support came from the Pakistan Army Corps of Engineers after the Pakistan Atomic Energy Commission (PAEC), selected a 185 m (607 ft)-base-to-summit high granite "bone-dry" mountain in 1976. The Geological Survey of Pakistan (GSP) conducted several tests on ground water and several other geology tests before the corps of engineers constructed and built a horizontal shaft where the devices were to be detonated.

Another testing area for vertical L-shaped shaft was built by the army engineers at the Kharan Desert region about 15 km (9.3 mi) west of H-shaped iron-steel tunnel first prepared in Ras Koh Test Site. The second testing area is located in a rolling sandy desert valley lined with sand ridges between the north of the Ras Koh Test Site and the Siahan Range to the south.

The construction of the shafts were completed in 1980, but the nuclear testing's were conducted in 1998 at the Ras Koh Test Site under series: Chagai-I and Chagai-II tests. Since 1998, Pakistani administrations have put a moratorium on nuclear weapons testing but there is unknown numbers of subcritical testing conducting to determine the viability of Pakistan's aging nuclear devices.

Known areas of interests
Sites	Location	Length	Notes
Koh Kambaran	Chagai District	Mountain at 185 m (607 ft) height	Underground nuclear testing area where Chagai-I was conducted
Kharan Dunes	North Ras Koh Range in Kharan District	Underground with 1,000 m (3,300 ft) deep L-shaft	Underground nuclear testing area where Chagai-II was conducted.

== See also ==
- International Day against Nuclear Tests
- Kirana Range
- Shamsi Airfield
