= Chagai-II =

Pakistan's second nuclear weapons test (1998)

Information
- Country: Pakistan
- Test site: Kharan Desert
- Period: 30 May 1998
- Number of tests: 1
- Test type: Underground tests
- Device type: Fission
- Max. yield: 25 kilotons of TNT (100 TJ)

Test chronology

Chagai-II is the codename assigned to the second atomic test conducted by Pakistan, carried out on 30 May 1998 in the Kharan Desert in Balochistan Province of Pakistan. Chagai-II took place two days after Pakistan's first successful test, Chagai-I, which was carried out on 28 May 1998 in the Ras Koh area in Chagai District, Balochistan, Pakistan.

The initial goals were to test the new designs of the weapon rather than studying the effects, and were different from the first tests in that they were primarily conducted by the Pakistan Atomic Energy Commission (PAEC), with the Pakistan Armed Forces engineering formations having only a supporting role.

The tests detonated implosion-type boosted-fission military-grade plutonium devices, contrary to the Chagai-I tests that were weapons-grade uranium devices. The performance of these tests made it a total of six tests performed by Pakistan in May 1998.

== Test preparations ==
=== Selection and planning ===
The Kharan Desert is a sandy and mountainous desert, with very high temperatures. The region is characterised by very low rainfall, high summer temperature, high velocity winds, poor soils, very sparse vegetation and a low diversity of plant species; its average temperature are recorded 55 °C (131 °F) in summer and 2.5 °C (36.5 °F) in winter session (sources vary).

Safety and security required an isolated, remote, and uninhabited area with extreme weather conditions to prevent any possible Radioactive Fallout. For this purpose, a three-dimensional survey was commenced by nuclear physicist Dr. Ishfaq Ahmad assisted by seismologist Dr. Ahsan Mubarak; it received final approval from Munir Ahmad in 1976. Unlike the granite mountains, the PAEC requirement was to find a suitable site in a desert region with almost no wildlife to prevent any kind of mutation, and to study blast effects of the weapons.

The weapon-testing sites were suspected to be located at Kharan, in a desert valley between the Ras Koh region to the north and Siahan Range to the south. Subsequently, the Chagai-Ras Koh-Kharan were cordoned off, becoming restricted entry zones closed to the public.

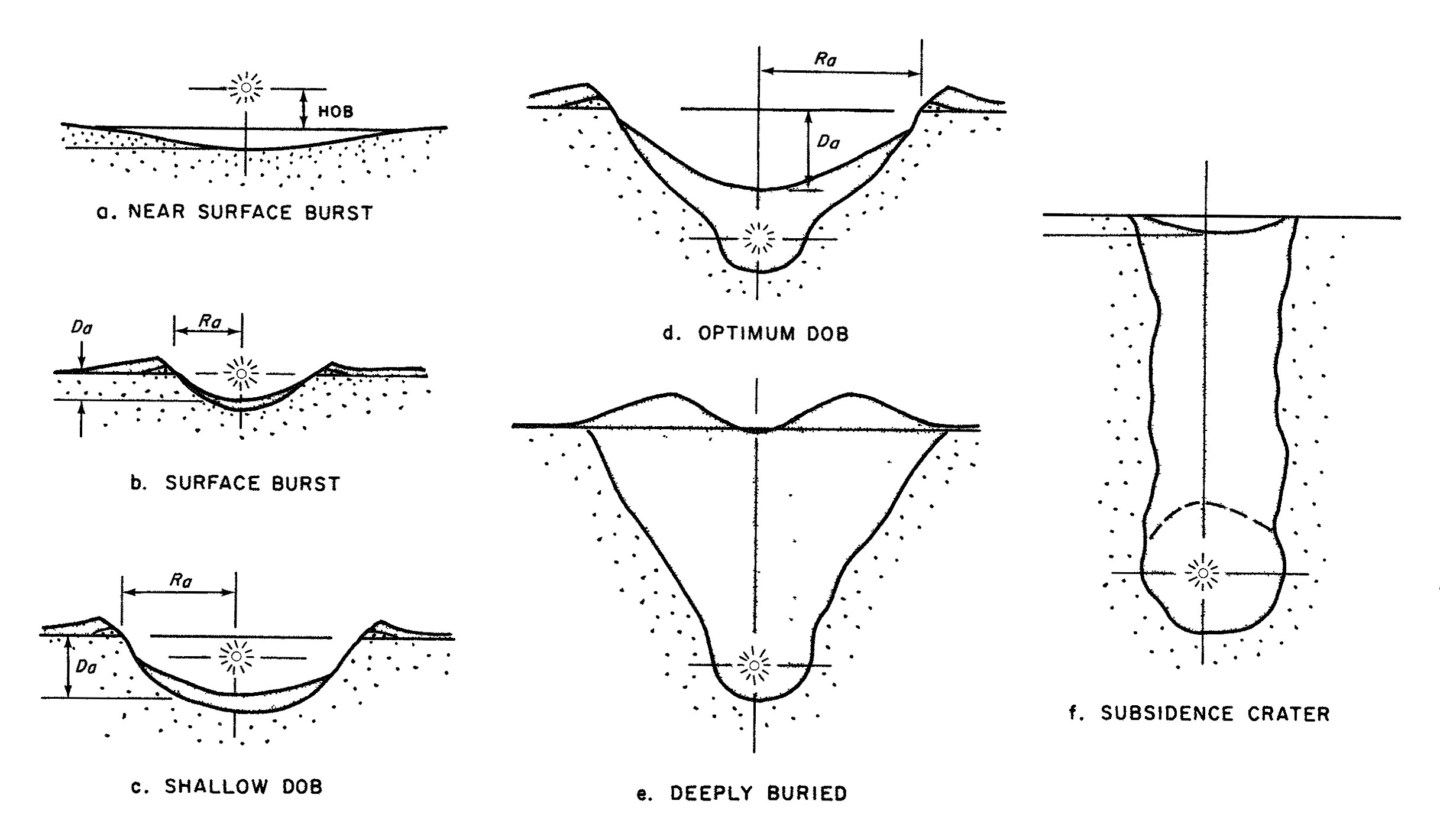
According to the PAEC, the weapon-testing labs were deeply crafted, L-shaped horizontal tunnels. A close depiction can be seen in diagram d, e, and f. The tests left a crater as its mark, similar to the illustration above.

After PAEC officials clearing with Prime minister Zulfikar Ali Bhutto, the preparations and logistics matters were given to the Pakistan Armed Forces. A secretly coded telegram was sent from the Prime Minister's Secretariat to V Corps Brigadier Muhammad Sarfraz. A helicopter, was arranged for the civilian scientists by Sarfraz. In 1977, Sarfraz was dispatched to the Military Engineering Service to commission engineering formations of the Pakistan military by General Zia-ul-Haq, the Chief of Army Staff. The PAEC officials readily agreed that the secondary tests would be scientific in nature with the armed forces playing the engineering roles.

The Special Development Works (SDW), assisted by the Corps of Engineers, Pakistan Army Corps of Electrical and Mechanical Engineering (PEME), and Frontier Works Organisation (FWO), spearheaded the engineering of the potential sites. The military engineers were well aware of satellite detection, therefore the site at Kharan was constructed with extra cautions. The test site was 300 by 200 feet (91 by 61 m) and was L-shaped horizontal shafts. Extensive installations of diagnostic cables, motion sensors, and monitoring stations were established inside the test site. It took nearly 2–3 years for the SDW to prepare and preparations were completed in 1980.

After posting at the General Headquarters, Sarfraz transferred the work to Lieutenant-General Zahid Ali Akbar, the Engineer-in-Chief of the Pakistan Army Corps of Engineers. The modernisation of the tests labs were undertaken by the FWO; the FWO uncredited work in the construction of the weapon-testings labs in Kharan Desert, and had supervised the entire construction on the sites along with the SDW.

Final preparations were overseen by then-Lieutenant-Colonel Zulfikar Ali Khan and PAEC chairman Munir Ahmad, assisted by Dr. Ishfaq Ahmad, the Member (Technical) of PAEC.

== Test and blast yields ==
The Pakistan Atomic Energy Commission (PAEC) teams of scientists and engineers arrived at the site led by Dr. Samar Mubarakmand, a nuclear physicist. The tests were conducted on 30 May 1998 at 13:10 hrs (1:10 pm) (PKT). The atomic bomb was small in size but very efficient and produced a very powerful shock wave and blast yield.

The devices were boosted fission weapons using military-grade plutonium, yielding 60.1% of the first tests performed two days earlier. The device was of a design cold tested in 1992. The Theoretical Physics Group (TPG) calculated that the blast yield was 20 kt of TNT equivalent. Although the American Physical Society estimated the yield at 8 kilotons of TNT (33 TJ) based on data received by their computer, Dr. Abdul Qadeer Khan confirmed the TPG blast calculations in an interview in 1998.

The Pakistan Atomic Energy Commission (or PAEC) had tested one or more plutonium nuclear devices, and the results and data of the devices were successful as was expected by the Pakistan's mathematicians and seismologists.

== Test teams ==
=== Pakistan Atomic Energy Commission ===
- Samar Mubarakmand, Member (Technical) at PAEC.
- Hafeez Qureshi, Directorate of Technical Development (DTD)
- Irfan Burney, Director of Directorate of Technical Procurement (DTP).
- Tariq Salija, Director of the Radiation and Isotope Applications Division (RIAD).
- Muhammad Jameel, Director of Directorate of Science and Engineering Services (DSES)
- Muhammad Arshad, the Chief Scientific Officer (CSO).
- Asghar Qadir, director, Theoretical Physics Group

=== Pakistan Army Corps of Engineers ===
- Lieutenant General Zulfikar Ali Khan Engineer-in-Chief of the System and Combat Engineering Division of the Pakistan Army Corps of Engineers

== See also ==
- Chagai-I
