= Chagai Hills =

Mountain range in Pakistan

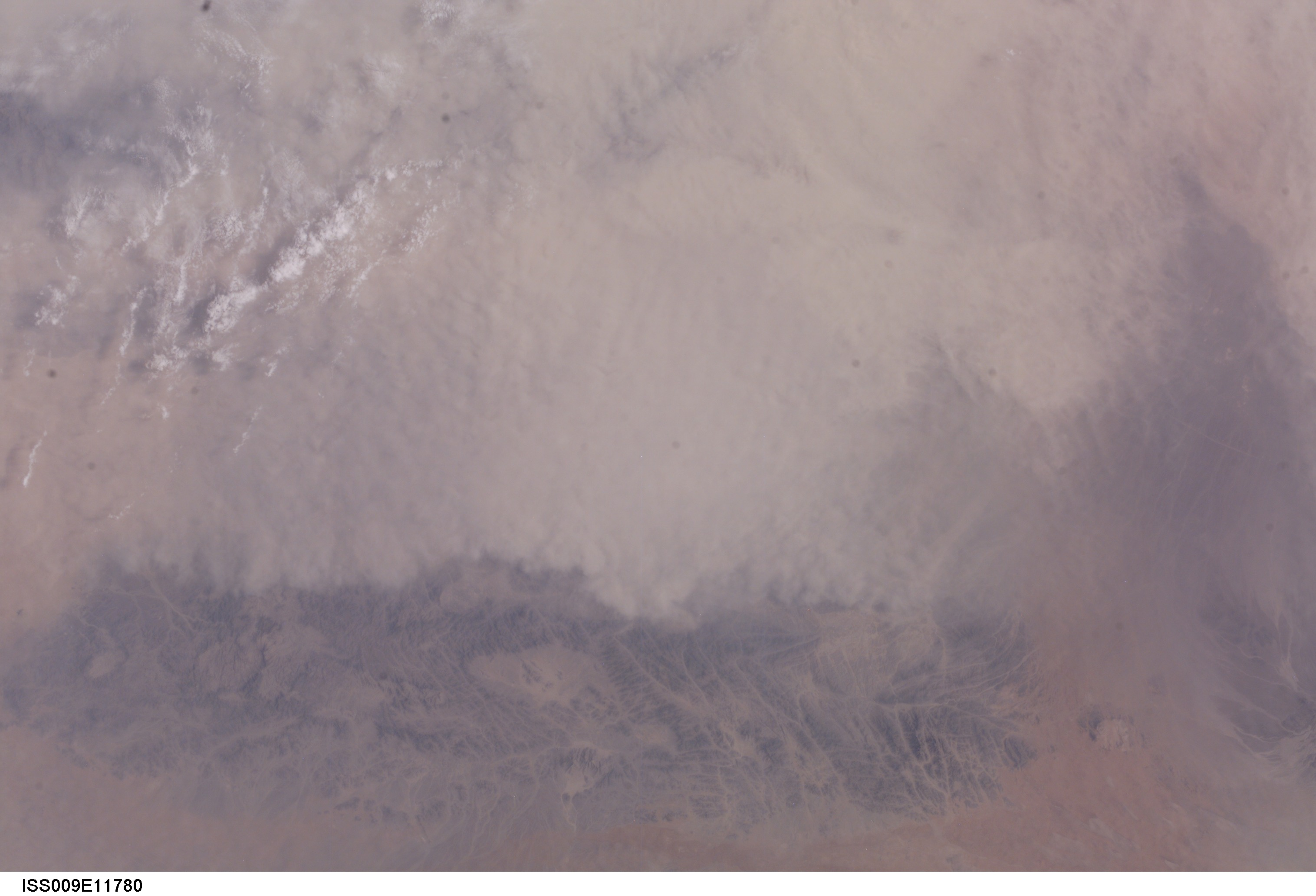
- The Chagai Hills under the dust storm as seen in a photo taken by the ISS Expedition-9 in 2004.

Highest point
- Peak: Malik Naru
- Elevation: 7,915 ft (2,412 m)

Dimensions
- Length: 130 km (81 mi)
- Width: 95 km (59 mi)

Naming
- Defining authority: Geological Survey of Pakistan (GSP)

Geography
- Location within Pakistan Location within Balochistan, Pakistan
- Location: Chagai District, Balochistan in Pakistan
- Region: Balochistan
- Range coordinates: 29°19′35.65″N 64°6′17.26″E
- Parent range: Toba Kakar
- Borders on: Durand Line (Pakistan–Afghanistan border)

Geology
- Mountain types: Igneous; sedimentary; metamorphic
- Rock type: Granite

Climbing
- Access: N-40 through Dalbandin

The Chagai Hills is a granite mountain range located in the Chagai District in Balochistan, Pakistan. The Chagai Hills face the border wall at the Durand Line– the official name of Afghanistan–Pakistan border.

The highest peak, Malik Naru, at the Chagai Hills is measured at 7,915 feet (2,412 m) and is a site of volcanic Koh-i-Sultan.

== Overview ==
=== Location and topography ===
During its time as part of the India under the British Queen Victoria, the British Geological Survey conducted the geological survey of the Chagai Hills, which was able to provide its coordinates lies between 28°46′N 63°18′E in 1908. The more precise coordinates were provided by the extensive geological survey by the Geological Survey of Pakistan (GSP) which provided the coordinates at 29°00′35.65″N 64°00′17.26″E in 1983.

The Chagai Hills terrain is mostly consists of dry desert and located in the northernmost area of Chagai District at the international Durand Line– the official name of Afghanistan–Pakistan border. The region where Chagai Hills are located is reported by the extremely dry with no prospect of water, which the GSP conducted a survey in search of water in 1975.

The Chagai Hills are stretched over an area that is approximately 130 kilometres (81 mi) and 95 kilometres (59 mi) wide. The highest peak, Malik Naru, at the Chagai Hills is measured at 7,915 feet (2,412 m) and is a site of volcanic Koh-i-Sultan.

=== Geology ===
Since 1901, the geology of Chagai Hills have been studied first by the European geologists and later by Pakistani geologists since 1960. The Chagai Hills are mostly granite mountains, some with average height of 200 m (660 ft)

The Pakistani investigations discovered the occurrences of copper, iron, zinc, molybdenum, sulfur, and limestones, the travertine, which is an interest of economic importance. The geological survey to explore uranium was also conducted in the region in 1957.

The Chagai Hills are continuous subject of interest of Volcanology which the Geological Survey of Pakistan (GSP) has commissioned its studies in a joint venture with the United States since 1997. The Koh-i-Sultan (lit. Mountain of the King) is a prominent site where its activity has provided scientific opportunity to the Pakistani seismologists and volcanologists. The fission carbon dating studies were first conducted on rocks and geological structure in 1997, which provided the age of Chagai Hills in Miocene-Late Pleistocene period.

== Climate ==
The Chagai Hills lie in an arid dry zone, which is outside the main monsoon belt, and lies in a very remote area since the absence of the water. The Chagai Hills receives only an average of 4 in (100 mm) of rain annually.

The temperature in Chagai Hills is noted to be extreme with summer being very hot and very cold winter. In 2019, the Pakistan Meteorological Department (PMD) reported the average minimum temperature 2 °C (36 °F) in January, and the average maximum temperature is 45 °C (113 °F) in July.

== Prominence ==
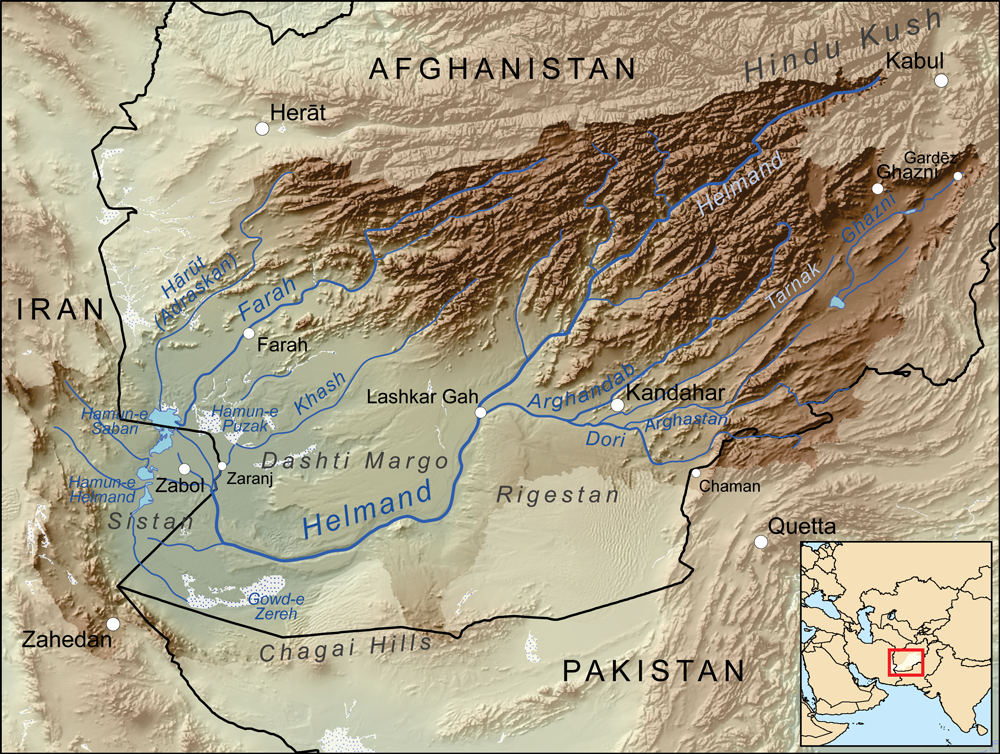
The Chagai Hills range showing in a map provided by the United States.

The Chagai Hills were relatively unknown area of interests where only scientific studies on its geological structure was carried out by the Pakistan government until 1994. The Chagai Hills received its prominence and significant attention when it was incorrectly mentioned as nuclear test site in a text, Critical Mass, published by American authors William E. Burrows and Robert Windrem in 1994.

With Pakistani administrations following the policy of deliberate ambiguity, the Chagai Hills were continuously suspected as a nuclear test site by the Western media outlets. Despite widely international media reporting and the local anti–nuclear protests being staged, there has been no radioactivity nor any nuclear weapon test activity that has ever taken place in the Chagai Hills albeit scientific studies on volcanology and hydrology.

The Ras Koh Range is the official Ministry of Defense range and designated nuclear test site where the nuclear weapon testing took place in 1998. A structural depression actually separates the Ras Koh Hills from the Chagai Hills— the Ras Koh Hills are actually located on the border of Chagai District and the Kharan District. The confusion is attributed in reporting due to the Pakistan's MoD codenamed the tests as Chagai to maintain secrecy at the actual weapon testing venues.

=== Media gallery ===
Chagai Hills
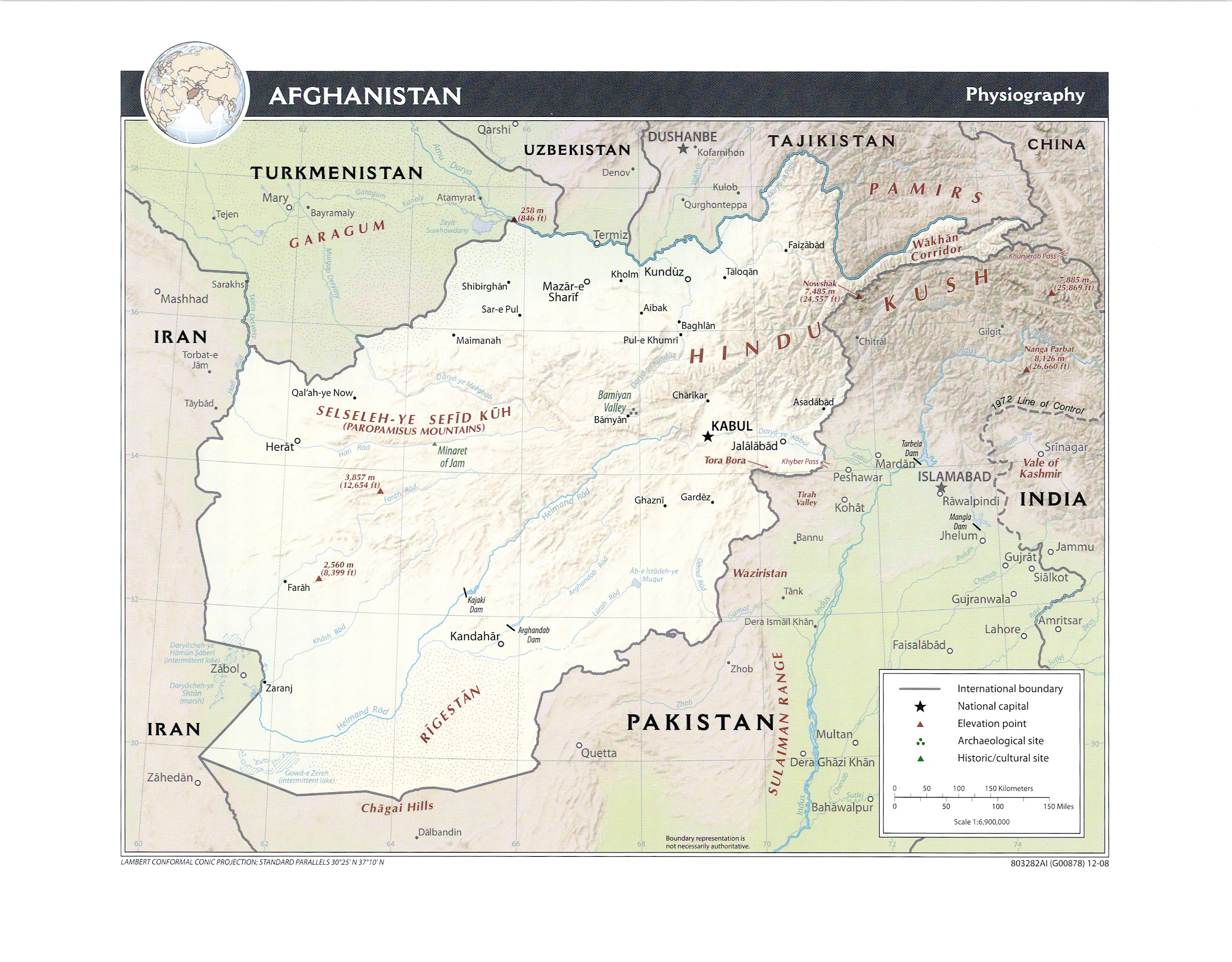
The physiography map provided by the United States. The Dalbandin is the closest town to the Chagai Hills.
