= Kharan Desert =

Desert in Balochistan, Pakistan

Kharan
- Gedrosia

Geography
- Location: Balochistan, Pakistan
- Interactive map of Kharan

The Kharan Desert (Urdu: صحرائے خاران) is a sandy and mountainous desert situated in Balochistan province in south-western Pakistan.

This desert was the site of Pakistan's second nuclear test, Chagai-II, which was carried out on 30 May 1998. The land is not fit for agriculture due to low irrigation. The occupation is mainly agriculture and farming. The terrain is mainly dry, grey-brown sand that stretches out.

Alexander the Great travelled through this region. He had entered the Indus Valley from the historic Khyber Pass and after defeating Porus, in the fourth century BC, he made his way back to Babylonia and passed through the Kharan desert (It was known as Gedrosia at that time), in an attempt to compare himself against Cyrus the Great who had once passed through the desert.

== See also ==
- List of deserts of Pakistan
