= Project-706 =

Code name for Pakistan's nuclear bomb program

Project 706
- Nine years of intensive effort culminated on 28 May 1998, when the Chagai-I nuclear test marked the successful completion of Pakistan's historic Project-706.
- Active: 1974–1983
- Disbanded: 11 March 1983
- Country: Pakistan
- Allegiance: Pakistan
- Branch: Pakistan Army Corps of Engineers
- Nickname: Kahuta Project
- Colours Code: Green and White
- Engagements: Cold War; Operation Opera; Operation Smiling Buddha; Soviet–Afghan War

Commanders
- Notable commanders: Zulfiqar Ali Bhutto; Gen. Zia-ul-Haq; Gen. Zahid Ali Akbar Khan; Gen. Javed Nasir

Insignia
- Insignia

Project-706, also known as Project-786, was the codename of a research and development program to develop Pakistan's first nuclear weapons. The program was initiated by Prime Minister Zulfiqar Ali Bhutto in 1974 in response to the Indian nuclear tests conducted in May 1974. During the course of this program, Pakistani nuclear scientists and engineers developed the requisite nuclear infrastructure and gained expertise in the extraction, refining, processing and handling of fissile material with the ultimate goal of designing a nuclear device. These objectives were achieved by the early 1980s with the first successful cold test of a Pakistani nuclear device in 1983. The two institutions responsible for the execution of the program were the Pakistan Atomic Energy Commission and the Kahuta Research Laboratories, led by Munir Ahmed Khan and Abdul Qadeer Khan, respectively. In 1976 an organization called Special Development Works (SDW) was created within the Pakistan Army, directly under the Chief of the Army Staff (Pakistan) (COAS). This organization worked closely with PAEC and KRL to secretly prepare the nuclear test sites in Baluchistan and other required civil infrastructure.

It was a major scientific effort of Pakistan. Project-706 refers specifically to the period from 1974 to 1983 when it was under the control first of former Prime Minister Zulfikar Ali Bhutto, and later on under the military administration of General Muhammad Zia-ul-Haq. The program's roots lay in scientists' apprehensions since 1967 that India was developing nuclear weapons.

Time magazine has called Project-706 Pakistan's equivalent of the United States Manhattan Project. The project initially cost US$450 million (raised by both Libya and Saudi Arabia) and was approved by Bhutto in 1972.

Project-706 led to the creation of multiple production and research sites that operated in extreme secrecy and ambiguity. Apart from research and development the project was also charged with gathering intelligence on Indian nuclear efforts. The Project was disbanded when the Pakistan Atomic Energy Commission (PAEC) carried out the first cold test of a miniature nuclear device on 11 March 1983. Scientists and military officers who participated in the Project were given leadership positions in their respective services, and conferred with high civil decorations by the Government of Pakistan.

== Origins ==
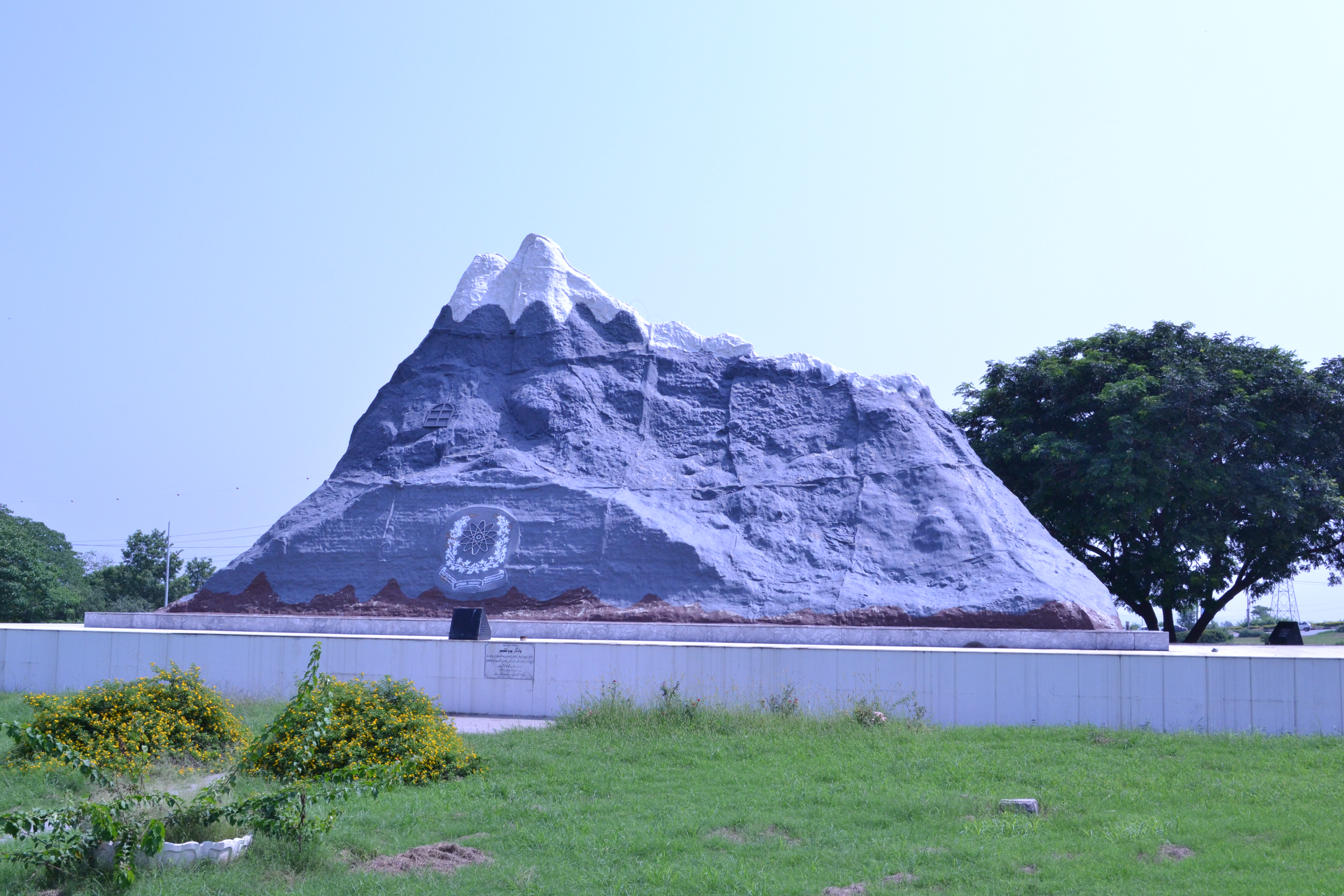
Chaghi Monument Islamabad Pakistan

=== Proposals ===
The history of Pakistani interest into nuclear science goes back to late 1948 when a large number of scientists, mathematicians, chemists, and physicists moved to Pakistan from India on the request of Prime minister Liaqat Ali Khan. The research in nuclear technology was encouraged by Mark Oliphant who, in 1948, wrote a letter to Muhammad Ali Jinnah to engage research in the peaceful use of nuclear technology. The only Muslim physicist available in South Asia was Rafi Muhammad Chaudhry, who could prove useful for Pakistan's nuclear development. A letter was directed to Chaudhry, who migrated to Pakistan in 1948 and established High-Tension Laboratory in 1952. On 8 December 1953, US President Dwight Eisenhower launched the Atoms for Peace program, where Pakistan was one of the first countries to sign the treaty. On 8 December 1953, the Pakistani media welcomed the proposed peaceful use of atomic energy, but Foreign minister Sir Zaf-rulla Khan stated that Pakistan did not have a policy towards the atom bomb. In 1956, Pakistan Atomic Energy Commission (PAEC) was founded and its first chairman was Nazir Ahmad, and Science Advisor to the Prime minister, Salimuzzaman Siddiqui served agency's first Technical (member). In 1958, the PAEC drafted a proposal to the military government of Field Marshal Ayub Khan for the acquisition of either the Canadian NRX heavy water reactor or the CP-5 reactor, at the Argonne National Laboratory. However, Ayub Khan's military government vetoed the proposal.

In March 1958, Nazir Ahmad made another proposal to the chairman of the Pakistan Industrial Development Corporation (PIDC) for setting up a heavy water nuclear plant with a production capacity of 50 kg of heavy water per day at Multan in conjunction with a planned fertilizer factory. However, the PIDC did not act on the PAEC's proposal. Field Marshal Ayub Khan rejected the proposal and instead transferred Nazir Ahmad immediately to the Federal Bureau of Statistics. In March 1959, the PAEC entered an agreement with United States Atomic Energy Commission, in which the United States agreed to provide a 5 MW pool-type reactor. In 1960, a bureaucrat named Ishrat Hussain Usmani succeeded Ahmad as chairman of the PAEC. Usmani played a pivotal role in the construction and development of Karachi Nuclear Power Plant by setting up uranium and plutonium exploration committees throughout the country. Many nuclear research institutes were also established, and work was begun to set up surveying the suitable sites for nuclear power plants.

In 1965, Science Advisor to the Government Abdus Salam traveled to United States to sign an agreement with the government of United States to provide a research reactor in Rawalpindi. In United States, Salam also held meeting with Edward Durell Stone, where he signed another contract. It was under Abdus Salam's leadership that Stone designed and then led construction of a nuclear research institute in Nilore.

The same year, the PAEC entered another agreement with General Electric of Canada to build a 137 MW Nuclear power plant at Karachi. In 1967, Abdus Salam urged Field Marshal Ayub Khan to acquire a nuclear fuel reprocessing facility from the United States, but Ayub Khan and his Finance minister, Muhammad Shoaib, had denied Salam's request.

After the 1965 India-Pakistan War, Zulfikar Ali Bhutto, Foreign minister at that time, began to lobby for a nuclear weapons option. 'If India builds the bomb, we will eat grass or leaves, even go hungry, but we will get one of our own. We have no other choice'. 'In October 1965, Bhutto visited Vienna to attend the International Atomic Energy Agency meeting. While there, he met with Munir Ahmad Khan, and other Pakistani scientists working at IAEA. Pakistani IAEA scientists briefed Bhutto on the rapid development of Indian nuclear programme. According to Munir Ahmad Khan, the nuclear facility at Trombay consisted of a plutonium production reactor, a reprocessing plant, and other facilities associated to weapon production. Bhutto quickly arranged a meeting with Ayub Khan. After this meeting, Ayub Khan remained unconvinced, and rejected the proposal made by Munir Ahmad Khan. Khan notified Bhutto immediately and told him about what had happened.

After learning what happened, Bhutto famously replied, "Don't worry. Our turn will come". In 1967, a team of Pakistani scientists, under Rafi Muhammad Chaudhry, produced the first batch of radioisotopes at the Pakistan Institute of Nuclear Science and Technology. The research in nuclear technology at PINSTECH began to pick up speed, and Abdus Salam began to supervise Pakistani research institutes.

In 1968, research on theoretical physics had begun at the newly created Institute of Physics (IP). The IP was established in the small department of physics at the Quaid-e-Azam University (as of today, the IP and the department of physics has been expanded). Pakistani theoretical physicists, such as Faheem Hussain, Peter Rotolli, John Mumtaz, Fayyazuddin, Ishfaq Ahmad, and Masud Ahmad, had begun research on theoretical and quantum physics. Faheem Hussain became the first physicist at IP to published research analysis on string theory. Later on, the Relativity Group under Fayyazuddin carried out work on the Bethe-Bloch theory. In 1969, Raziuddin Siddiqui established Einstein's Physics Group (EPG) and carried out experiments on general relativity and quantum mechanics.

== The Indo-Pakistani 1971 War ==
In March 1970, the general elections were held in Pakistan under the Military government of General Yahya Khan. The electoral results triggered the Bangladesh Liberation War in East Pakistan. Meanwhile, the political situation in West Pakistan was further deteriorating, and tension momentarily grew between the East and West Pakistan. A military action in East Pakistan called Operation Searchlight opened a series of bloody counter-insurgency operations led by the defected Bengali dissidents of Pakistan Armed Forces. Later, India intervened in the conflict as covert operations were successfully led by the Indian intelligence agencies.

This was followed by Indo-Pakistani War of 1971, a war in the western front. Pakistan, now fighting on both fronts, lost the war after only 13 days. The war with India and East-Pakistan had caused the collapse of the military dictatorship of Yahya Khan, and dissolution of United Pakistan.

During the Indo-Pakistani War of 1971, Pakistan had lost a significant amount of territory as well as geopolitical and economic influence in South-Asia. The size of the Military of Pakistan and the civil population dramatically decreased. Pakistan lost half its Navy, a quarter of its Air Force and a third of its Army as well as losing millions of citizens to newly created Bangladesh.

Under pressure by the public and media, Military Government's Combatant Headquarters, the GHQ, gave in to Zulfikar Ali Bhutto. As Zulfikar Ali Bhutto came into political power, governmental nuclear organizations came under control of Bhutto. In early January 1972, the year after the war, the ISI learned that India was close to developing an atomic bomb. Bhutto called Munir Ahmad Khan from Vienna and immediately removed Ishrat Hussain Usmani as the chairman of the Pakistan Atomic Energy Commission. Abdus Salam, Science Advisor, managed a meeting of senior scientists and officials of PAEC.

== Organization ==
In December 1972, Nobel laureate Abdus Salam began to initiate the work on nuclear weapons. Abdus Salam called two of his students, Riazuddin and Masud Ahmad working at the International Centre for Theoretical Physics (ICTP) to report to Munir Ahmad Khan. Theoretical physicists at Institute of Physics (IP) of Quaid-e-Azam University began to report back to Pakistan Atomic Energy Commission. Theoretical physicists at IP formed the "Theoretical Physics Group (TPG)", which was mandated to develop the design of Pakistan's nuclear weapons. Abdus Salam played an integral role in TPG, and had done the groundbreaking work for the "Theoretical Physics Group", which was initially headed by Salam until 1974. The TPG took the research in Fast neutron calculations—the key to calculations of critical mass and weapon detonation. The TPG began to report directly to Abdus Salam and research was undertaken under his supervision. The TPG examined the problems of neutron diffraction, the theory of Simultaneity, hydrodynamics, and what kind of and how much fissile material and reflectors would be used. In 1973, Bhutto appointed Raziuddin Siddiqui as Technical member of Pakistan Atomic Energy Commission, and made him responsible for the preparation of its charter. Raziuddin Siddiqui, a theoretical physicist, established the Mathematical Physics Group (MPG) that took charge to carry out research in calculations on MC Integrals, cross section theory, critical mass theory, and mathematics involved in general theory of fission reactions.

Educated at the Argonne National Laboratory, Munir Ahmad Khan and Abdus Salam called a meeting to initiate a work on an atomic weapon in March 1974 at the Pinstech Institute. The meeting was convened by Abdus Salam and Riazuddin of the Theoretical Physics Group (TPG), Asghar Qadir and Munir Ahmad Rashid of Mathematical Physics Group (MPG), Ishfaq Ahmad and Samar Mubarakmand of Nuclear Physics Group (NPG), and Hafeez Qureshi and Zaman Sheikh of Wah Group Scientists (WGS). During the meeting, the word "bomb" was never used, instead the academic scientists preferred to use scientific research rationale. The Plutonium and Uranium exploration committees, under Ishfaq Ahmad and Ahsan Mubarak, made discoveries of natural raw plutonium ores and Natural uranium deposits in the different areas of country. The Nuclear Physics Group, formed in 1967, began to work to under Ishfaq Ahmad. The NPG analysis the problems on the converting ^{238}U into ^{239}Pu. In the 1980s the NPG successfully produced the 10 kg of uranium. The NPG also manufactured and reprocessed the Plutonium isotopes at the New Labs, PARR-Reactor. In March 1974, a meeting led by Abdus Salam and Munir Ahmad Khan constituted a small directorate, code name Wah Group Scientists (WGS). Its members contained Hafeez Qureshi, director-general of Radiation Isotope Application Division (RIAD), and Zaman Sheikh, a chemical engineer from DESTO. The Wah Group Scientists began research on high precision mechanical and chemical components, physics calculation, high explosives and triggering mechanism. The same month of March, Abdus Salam and Munir Ahmad Khan set up a plant to manufacture fissile explosive lenses. In April 1974, Abdus Salam formed another group, Laser Physics Group (LPG), headed by Shaukat Hameed Khan. The Laser Physics Group was charged to carry out research and discover a process to separate NU into EU and DU. The LPG used advanced laser technologies, and examined the problems in molecular isotopic of separation of ^{235}U—whether to use infrared or Ultra violet lasers—and Electromagnetic radiation and atomic spectroscopy— what would be its wavelength and how atoms separated and ionized.

In early 1974, under the advice of Abdus Salam, PAEC formed another group, "Fast Neutron Physics Group", under Samar Mubarakmand. The Fast Neutron Physics Group (FNPG) took research in and examined the problems in the science of neutron, a subatomic particle. The Fast Neutron Physics Group calculated the numerical ranges of neutrons—how much power would be produced by the neutrons—and the efficiency of neutrons—determined the number of neutrons would be produced—in a device. The Fast Neutron Physics Group discovered the treatment process for the Fast, thermal and slow neutrons, and examined the behaviour of Neutron fluxes, and Neutron sources in particle accelerator installed at PINSTECH. The Fast Neutron Physics Group used the R-process to determine the neutrons' behaviour in the fissionable device.

End of 1974, Pakistan's Parliament passed a bill with a majority, declaring Ahmadis to be non-Muslims after which Abdus Salam, a senior scientist and Ahmadi, left Pakistan for Great Britain in protest. After the departure of Salam, Munir Ahmad Khan continued the organizations. The Nuclear Engineering Division, under Bashiruddin Mahmood set up a ^{238}U production facility and the construction began under Munir Ahmad Khan's direction.

=== Abdul Qadeer Khan ===
On 22 May 1974, three years after the events in 1971, India carried out its first nuclear test, code named Smiling Buddha, near Pakistan's Eastern Border of Sindh. The nuclear test came as a surprise and caused a great alarm at the Government of Pakistan. On 19 May 1974, in a news conference, Bhutto stressed that India's nuclear program was designed 'to intimidate Pakistan and establish India's hegemony in the subcontinent'.

Abdul Qadeer Khan, a German-trained metallurgical engineer and nuclear weapon technologist, had spent years at URENCO in Belgium and the Netherlands. While at URENCO, Khan was considered a senior translator at the facility and as such had gained access to the most confidential sites and information.

After the India's nuclear test, Khan wrote a letter to Bhutto in which he explained that he had gained expertise in centrifuge-based uranium enrichment technologies at URENCO in Belgium. Bhutto directed the letter to Munir Ahmad Khan to arrange a meeting with A.Q. Khan. In October 1974, Munir A. Khan sent Sultan Bashiruddin Mahmood to The Netherlands to interview Qadeer Khan. In December 1974, Khan returned to Pakistan to meet Prime Minister Ali Bhutto and PAEC Chairman Munir Ahmad Khan, where he tried to convince Bhutto to adopt his uranium route rather than the plutonium approach. Bhutto did not agree to halt the Plutonium route but decided on the spot to place Khan in charge of the uranium program, which would become a parallel nuclear program.

Khan initially worked under Bashiruddin Mahmood. But on 19 April 1976, Khan wrote to Munir Ahmad Khan expressing that he was not satisfied and that he wanted to work independently. The letter was forwarded to Prime minister's secretariat. A.Q. Khan, with support from Prime Minister Bhutto, formed the Engineering Research Laboratories, which later became known as the Kahuta Research Laboratories (KRL). Just as PAEC, the KRL was under direct control of Prime Minister Bhutto and A.Q. Khan reported directly to the Prime Minister. A.Q. Khan disliked the idea of PAEC getting involved in ERL project, but favoured the Pakistan Army Corps of Engineers to lead the program. The work on ERL was initiated by Bhutto, and the project was assigned to Pakistan Army Corps of Engineers.

As per recommendation of A.Q. Khan, the Engineer-in-Chief of Corps of Engineers selected Brigadier Zahid Ali Akbar Khan, who was renowned for the construction of the GHQ in Rawalpindi, the headquarters of Pakistan Army's Combatant Command, as the head of the project. Brigadier Zahid Ali Akbar led the accelerated construction of the facility, and began to co-administrator the program, alongside Bhutto himself. Impressed by his work at Kahuta, Bhutto gave him additional and secretive assignments for both PAEC and KRL. An office was set up in Prime minister's Secretariat for Brigadier Akbar as he kept Bhutto informed about the construction of the ERL.

Throughout the years, A.Q. Khan had established an administrative proliferation network through Dubai to smuggle URENCO nuclear technology to the Kahuta Research Laboratories. He established Pakistan's gas-centrifuge program which was also loosely based on the URENCO's Zippe-type centrifuge.

=== Zahid Ali Akbar Khan ===
By September 1976 a one hundred acre site near Kahuta was personally selected, as Abdul Qadeer Khan claimed in his columns. Prime Bhutto asked Chief of Army Staff General Tikka Khan that Brigadier Akbar Khan be promoted to two-star major-general, as it was felt that the title "general" would sway with the academic scientists working on the confidential projects. As a two-star general, Zahid Ali Akbar Khan led the constructions of both the Metallurgical Laboratory in Wah Cantonment (ML) and the uranium enrichment plant in Kahuta. Originally known as Engineering Research Laboratories (ERL), the facility was renamed Khan Research Laboratories (KRL) in May 1981 by the Military President and Chief of Army Staff General Zia-ul-Haq in the honor of Abdul Qadeer Khan.

There are inconsistencies in the above account, which suggests that Brigadier Zahid Ali Akbar Khan was promoted to the rank of two star general by Gen Tikka on the orders of Bhutto to sway the scientists. This account contradicts Dr A.Q. Khan's account which suggests that Zahid Ali Akbar was neither promoted nor deputed by Gen Tikka. According to A.Q., Zahid was deputed to KRL as a Brigadier in the days of Gen Zia (after Gen Tikka retired from the Army) and the promotion to two star general came sometime after that event.

=== Administrative committees ===
Considering the secrecy of the projects and to maintain leadership over the programmes, Bhutto decided to form a committee that would be responsible for coordination and order in the projects that the academic scientists were working on. In 1974, Bhutto appointed the civil engineer Mubashir Hassan as the head of the committee. Mubashir, with Munir Ahmad Khan, devised a policy that prevented the nuclear proliferation at first. Before the arrival of Abdul Qadeer Khan, Mubashir had been encouraging academic scientists to develop classified technologies ingeniously. Hassan supervised the construction of the nuclear research laboratories, facilities and testing laboratories throughout the country. With little influence of military, Hassan was a proponent of establishing nuclear facilities. Scientists were directly reporting to Dr. Hassan and other civilian officers, while the final reports were submitted to Hassan, who would brief Bhutto over the progress. After his arrival, Khan started to work with Hassan and Sultan Bashiruddin Mahmood, but was dissatisfied with constant involvement of Hassan, who continued to look critically at Khan's suspected activities in Europe and elsewhere. In 1975, Abdul Qadeer Khan met with Bhutto in private and requested a military department to supervise his work rather than Hassan. Throughout the 1975 until 1977, the military had little influence in the programme and were only involved in a small scale programme with Khan. However, the civil committee was disbanded by General Zia-ul-Haq as he fired Hassan and imprisoned him in the Central Jail of Ralwalpindi with Bhutto in 1977. The same year, the military took control of the programme and, for the first time, became involved in every aspect of the programme. 26 September 1979, after the removal of Zulfikar Ali Bhutto, Major-general Zahid Ali Akbar Khan assumed the command of Project-706. A military engineer by profession, Khan administratively established military engineer groups in his corps. He supervised the rapid construction of the Electrical and Vacuum Laboratory (EVL) as well as the development of the town of Kahuta. Throughout the years, Major-general Akbar served as the director-general the Kahuta facility. By the 1983, Akbar was promoted to three-star rank of lieutenant general as the military wanted a suitable administrator who thoroughly understood the scientific needs of the project. The same year, Akbar was also given command of the Pakistani Army Corps of Engineers in order to recruit senior people whose cooperation were required.

Lieutenant-General Akbar established a military unit to provide logistic support to both PAEC and KRL. Known as "Special Works Development (SDW)", it was responsible for the rapid construction of facilities, led by Brigadier Muhammad Sarfaraz. In 1977, Prime minister Bhutto established a military committee to maintain military administrative leadership in project. The Military Engineering Committee (MEC) was led by Major-general Zahid Ali Akbar, and had Major-general Anis Ahmad — OC of Central Works Organization, Air Vice-marshal (Major-general) Michael John O'Brian—AOC of Sargodha Air Force Base, Air Vice-marshal (Major-general) Eric Gordan Hall—AOC of Chaklala Air Force Base, Brigadier Muhammad Sarfaraz—CO of Special Works Development, and Colonel Zulfikar Ali Khan—CO of 17th FWO Regiment. Meanwhile, A.Q. Khan had established a proliferation network through Dubai to smuggle URENCO nuclear technology to Kahuta Research Laboratories, including sensitive vacuum and technical equipments necessary for the enrichment technology. He subsequently established Pakistan's gas-centrifuge program based on the URENCO's Zippe-type centrifuge.

Qadeer Khan had brought with him knowledge of gas centrifuge technologies that he had learned through his position at the classified URENCO uranium enrichment plant in the Netherlands. After General Akbar, Khan himself was put in charge of building, equipping and operating the Kahuta facility. Khan took over the centrifuge part of the Uranium Enrichment Program from Chairman of PAEC Munir Ahmad Khan, while all other uranium related steps to making uranium gas for enrichment remained under Munir Ahmad Khan's responsibility. Bhutto also continued to retain Chairman of PAEC Mr. Munir Ahmad Khan as the head of Plutonium production, nuclear fuel cycle, uranium exploration, processing and conversion, nuclear weapons development and reactor programs.

=== Foreign Intelligence ===
The locations of nuclear sites were more secure than the Prime Minister Secretariat, as the Government of Pakistan was aware of the United States, Soviet Union, and other foreign intelligence agencies had a strong interest. According to Brigadier Imtiaz Ahmad, United States had ground intelligence and the ISI had apparently arrested a number of Soviet and American spies in 1976. Brigadier Imtiaz also claimed in an interview with News International that he had conducted the military operation "Rising Sun" in 1979 that successfully thwarted a CIA plot to target Pakistani nuclear scientists and engineers who were closely associated with Pakistan's nuclear programme. The operation concluded with the arrest and life imprisonment of a supposed Pakistani CIA agent, Rafiq Safi Munshi, who it was alleged had been working as a nuclear engineer at KANUPP, and as such had tried to wire classified atomic documents to the American consulate in Karachi. This however, was untrue, as Mr Munshi was employed by KESC at the time and was engaged in the movement against Zia. It was his pro-democracy politics that lead to his imprisonment. The operation ended with a declaration of a few undercover CIA agents and U.S. diplomats as personae non-gratae.

On 26 June 1979, Pakistan's ISI arrested the French Ambassador to Pakistan, Pol LeGourrierec, and his First Secretary, Jean Forlot, close to Kahuta Research Laboratories nuclear complex. Both were intercepted and their cameras and other sensitive equipment were confiscated. According to Pakistan, documents that were intercepted later suggested that the two were recruited by the CIA.

After the successful outcomes of Operation Opera, Israel supposedly planned an attack on the suspected nuclear facility in the early 1980s. The Military Intelligence (MI) and Air Intelligence (AI) of Pakistan learned of the Israeli attempted operation when Israeli Air Force's fighter jets flew close to Pakistan's northern border. The PAF responded immediately. The PAF's aggressor squadron's jets belonging to No. 11 Squadron Arrows intercepted the IAF jets and gained a missile lock on one of the Israeli jets. The Israeli jets pulled back subsequently. Soon after the incident, Munir Ahmad Khan met with Raja Ramanna of India. A high-level Pakistani mission was sent to Vienna, where both countries signed an agreement promising not to attack or assist a foreign power to attack each other's facilities.

=== Uranium route ===
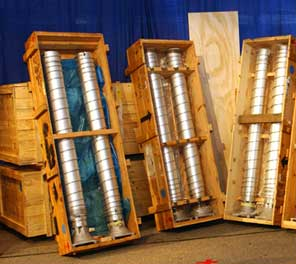
Dr. Abdul Qadeer Khan's UF_{6} gas centrifuges

Natural uranium consists of only 99.3% ^{238}U and only 0.7% ^{235}U, but only the latter is fissile. The rarer but chemically identical ^{235}U must be physically separated from the more plentiful isotope. This process of uranium enrichment into weapon-grade is extremely difficult and sensitive, and requires advanced technology.

Before Khan's arrival, a Coordination Board was set up to manage and supervise the Projects' uranium-route. Sultan Bashiruddin Mehmood of the Nuclear Engineering Division, was made the project director. Khan took over the project from Mahmood as he wanted to work alone. This Board was composed of A G N Kazi, Ghulam Ishaq Khan, Agha Shahi, and Munir Ahmad Khan. The Pakistan Defence Forces also had established their own boards to support the engineering research activities throughout the country. However, the ERL continued to remain under the overall supervision of PAEC until 1977 after which it was separated and made independent, but throughout the subsequent years and the 1980s, Munir Ahmad Khan continued to serve as a member and later as head of the Uranium enrichment project's Coordination Board. The PAEC sat its own uranium enrichment program to develop an advanced version for uranium fuel. The PAEC had worked on the most challenging method of isotope separation molecular laser isotopes, gaseous and thermal diffusion. All of these methods were developed and supervised under Shaukat Hameed Khan of the Laser Physics Group (LPG) and Sultan Bashiruddin Mehmood of the Nuclear Engineering Division (NED). At PAEC, the Laser Physics Group, under the direction of Shaukat Hameed Khan, developed the MLIS process for the isotopes separation. Meanwhile, the PAEC continued its support to Engineering Research Laboratories. The PAEC produced ^{6}UF and provided its feedstock to KRL while the PAEC had used ^{6}UF in both of their developed Gas and Thermal diffusion methods in their enrichment laboratories. In 1978, the PAEC had eliminated the MLIS method as secondary process due to its difficulty and complexity. A.Q. Khan's gas centrifuges also became a reason that PAEC was not supported to continue its work on MLIS method as secondary process. However, the PAEC did not completely abandon the work on MLIS method; instead it was continued for the research purposes only under Shaukat Hameed Khan. In 1982, the MLIS method was used to separate plutonium isotopes at the Neutron Activation Analysis Laboratory of the PINSTECH. For this, Shaukat Hameed Khan was conferred with a civil award by the president.

Dr. A.Q. Khan's designed the centrifuges loosely based on Zippe-type gas centrifuges.

Initially, the KRL scientists suffered many setbacks and were unable to develop the machine. While visiting at the Physics Hall of Qau, Alam met with Tasnim Shah, a professor of mathematics at Qau. Alam introduced Shah with KRL scientists where they examined the problems. It was followed by forming Computation Fluid Dynamics (CFD) Division. The CFD Division analyzed the problems of the SWU—measuring the amount of work done by the centrifuge, and Centrifugal acceleration—how many rpm would a machine covered, and Rotational dynamics—what would be its appropriate rotational speed. Tasneem Shah gained fame when he independently analysed the issue, and assisted the KRL scientists to develop a powerful version of the centrifuges.

As the problems were being resolved, Khan began the enrichment operations. By the start of 1983, the KRL had developed around 1,500–2,900 gas centrifuges loosely based on Urenco Group technology. It was thanks to Abdul Qadeer Khan's effort that on 4 June 1978, scientists working in the Engineering Research Laboratories (ERL) succeed in enriching uranium by electromagnetic isotope separation of ^{238}U and ^{235}U isotopes at the then-Pakistan Air Force controlled-Chaklala Air Force Base Centrifuge Laboratory (CACL). Ghulam Dastagir Alam, who co-headed the isotope separation project, informed Abdul Qadeer Khan. Khan immediately went to GHQ to informed General Zia-Ul-Haq.

By the end of 1983, ERL/KRL under Qadeer Khan, claimed to carry out the first cold test of a single nuclear device but this is debated as the Pakistan Atomic Energy Commission had also carried out a first cold test of a working nuclear device on 11 March 1983. Although, PAEC did not use weapon grade plutonium or uranium in their test, KRL's cold test was different in this regard.

=== Plutonium route ===
Despite the research and development effort put to develop an atomic device, the Plutonium route was never a part of Project-706 as PAEC had separated the Plutonium route from that project. The climax and the main focus of Project-706 was to build the Kahuta facility as well as the atomic bomb by using the centrifugal technology that was developed by the Qadeer Khan from his experience at URENCO GROUP. On many different occasions, Khan had objected the Munir Ahmad Khan's work, and unsuccessfully tried to remove Munir Khan from the research and development as A.Q. Khan wanted the government to focus on his method only. After the dismissal of the Bhutto Government, Lieutenant-general Zahid Ali Akbar became in charge of the Project, supervising both PAEC and KRL research developmental work. General Zahid Ali Akbar led the accelerated construction of a plutonium reactor in Rawalpindi which was designed by Hafeez Qureshi. In 1981, the reactor went critical under Iqbal Hussain Qureshi. The reactor was put on test in the early 1980s and was processed at ~50% efficiency; the reactor produced the first batch of weapon-grade plutonium.

In 1976, A.Q. Khan was unable to convince Bhutto to halt the Plutonium route. Against the wishes of Khan, the work on plutonium separation process and conversion of uranium into plutonium was taking place under Munir Ahmad Khan. Meanwhile, a team of nuclear chemists of Nuclear Chemistry Division (NCD), under Iqbal Hussain Qureshi, considered the problem of how plutonium could be separated from uranium when its chemical properties were not known. Nuclear chemists were able to find a separation process, and balanced the first equation for the nuclear weapon at PAEC. The PAEC had worked on the difficult and most challenging plutonium separation process which was developed by both Ishfaq Ahmad and Iqbal Hussain Qureshi. At New Labs, the PAEC produced the reactor-grade plutonium isotopes, and reprocessed them into weapon-grade. The breakthrough with plutonium experiment was at the PINSTECH Laboratory by Iqbal Hussain Qureshi of NCD and Ishfaq Ahmad of Nuclear Physics Group (NPG). The scientists realized that a slow neutron reactor fuelled with uranium would theoretically produce substantial amounts of ^{239}Pu as a by-product. The experiments also showed theoretically feasible grounds that element 94 would be readily fissionable by both slow and fast neutrons, and had the added advantage of being chemically different from uranium, and could easily be separated from it. After the discovery, the PAEC used Shaukat Hameed Khan's MLIS method to separate plutonium isotopes at Neutron Facility at PINSTECH. From 1974, Shaukat Hameed Khan had continuously worked on this complex and difficult method and successfully used the method to separate the isotopes of plutonium. For this achievement, Shaukat Hameed Khan was conferred with high-civil award by the President. Unlike A.Q. Khan, the PAEC scientists and engineers under Munir Ahmad Khan developed an indigenous capability to develop the programme. The scientists and engineers brought together the experience which they had gained while working in European and American nuclear firms, and designed reprocessing plants, weapons laboratories, enrichment techniques and production of weapon grade plutonium.

In March 1983, only senior scientists and high civil and military officials were invited to witness the cold test of a working nuclear device. In March 1983, the Corps of Engineers, under General Akbar, cleared the tunnels and a PAEC's diagnostic team headed by Samar Mubarakmand arrived on the nuclear test site with trailers fitted with computers and diagnostic equipment. This was followed by the arrival of the DTD Group and the Wah Group Scientists (WGS) with the atomic device, in sub-assembly form. This was assembled and then placed inside the tunnel. A monitoring system was set up with around 20 cables linking various parts of the device with oscillators in diagnostic vans parked near the Kirana Hills.

On 11 March 1983, PAEC, successfully tested the non-weapon grade plutonium device in Kirana Hills under the leadership of Munir Ahmad Khan with Ishfaq Ahmad heading the test team. The 10 kg non-weaponized grade ^{239}Pu, and the natural uranium came from New-Labs at PINSTECH institute, and the detonation system of the implosion devices was developed at the Directorate of Technical Development (DTD) of PAEC under the leadership of Hafeez Qureshi.

The successful cold fission test was witnessed by PAEC chairman Munir Ahmad Khan, General Khalid Mahmud Arif, Air Vice-marshal (Major-general) Michael John O'Brian, and then-Chairman of Senate, Ghulam Ishaq Khan. The nuclear device was indigenously developed by the PAEC's research wing, Directorate of Technical Development (DTD), headed by Mr. Muhammad Hafeez Qureshi. Also, it was Qureshi's designed and developed plutonium-based nuclear device, which was developed during the period of the 1980s under the umbrella of Project-706. Pakistan, under the leadership of Samar Mubarakmand, who tested the two nuclear devices on 30 May 1998 at the Kharan desert, with the codename Chagai-II.

== Libya and Project-706 ==
According to Time magazine, Pakistan received hundreds of millions of dollars for Project-706 from Libya. In return, Libya sent scientists to study Pakistan's enrichment advances. Nominally, the Libyan payments were made in return for Pakistani military assistance.

Prime minister Zulfikar Ali Bhutto invited Libya to join Project-706 as Libya was the sole financier of Pakistan's Project-706. Libya also hoped that by following Pakistan's Project-706, Libya could have its own nuclear weapon program. Libya responded to the invitation by preparing and sending its small team of nuclear scientists to the Pakistan's high-powered nuclear research institutions.

By the time Libya had joined the research, Bhutto was hanged after a military coup d'état by Chief of Army Staff Muhammad Zia-ul-Haq. According to Time magazine, Zia had opposed Bhutto's idea of Libya joining Project-706. In 1977, after Zia took over the government, Libya's connection with Project-706 was immediately cut, resulting in Libyan scientists leaving Pakistan. According to the Time article, Zia personally disliked and distrusted Colonel Gaddafi.

== See also ==
- Soviet atomic bomb project
- Manhattan Project
- Chagai-I
- Pakistan and nuclear weapons
- Other projects
  - Operation Alsos
  - German nuclear energy project
  - Japanese atomic program
  - Soviet atomic bomb project
  - Tube Alloys (British World War II atomic program)
- Nuclear weapons
  - History of nuclear weapons
  - Nuclear arms race
  - Nuclear weapon
  - Nuclear weapon design
  - Isotope separation (necessary for uranium enrichment)
  - List of countries with nuclear weapons
  - The United States and nuclear weapons
- Other Topics
  - Pakistan – United States relations
  - Indo-Pakistani War of 1971
  - Indo-Pakistani relations
  - Pakistan-Soviet Relations
