= Hafeez Hoorani =

Pakistani particle physicist

- Born: 1958 (age 67–68); Karachi, Sindh province
- Citizenship: Pakistan
- Education: Karachi University; Simon Fraser University
- Known for: Loop gravity, Big Bang Theory, Gaseous ionization detectors and Quantum field theory
- Scientific career
- Fields: High Energy Physics
- Workplaces: European Organization for Nuclear Research (CERN); International Centre for Theoretical Physics (ICTP); National Center for Physics(NCP); Quaid-e-Azam University (Qau)
- Doctoral advisor: David H. Boal
- Other academic advisors: K.S. Vishwanatham and M. Plischke

Hafeez Hoorani or Hafeez-ur-Rehman Hoorani or Hafeez R. Hoorani is a Pakistani particle physicist, with a specialisation in accelerator physics, and a research scientist at the CERN. Hoorani is working at the National Center for Physics, with research focus in elementary particle physics and high energy physics. Until the end of 2013, he served as scientific director of International Centre for Synchrotron-Light for Experimental Science Applications in the Middle East (SESAME) and is now research associate at the National Center for Nuclear Physics, Islamabad.

He has served as a full professor of high energy physics at the National Center for Physics where he heads a group building the muon chamber for the Compact Muon Solenoid detector. He also supervised two PhD students during his stay at the National Center for Physics.

== Education ==
Hoorani was born in Karachi and received his early education from there. He attended Karachi University in 1976 and received his BSc with Honors in physics in 1980, followed by his MSc in particle physics from the same institution in 1982. On a KU's awarded scholarship, Hoorani went to Burnaby, Canada where he attended Simon Fraser University. In October 1986, he received his PhD in Experimental High Energy Physics under the supervision of Dr. David H. Boal, writing his thesis on Numerical Solution for Hydrodynamic Equations For the Quark-Gluon Plasma.

== CERN ==
In 1987, Hoorani joined the International Centre for Theoretical Physics where he continued his research into Quark–gluon plasma and published a brief journal on Production of J/ψ IK Quark-Gloun Plasma in February 1988. Hoorani joined CERN in 1989 where he carried out a large amount of research at CERN's Large Electron–Positron Collider or LEP. In 1999, he returned to Pakistan for a short visit where he successfully convinced the Government of Pakistan to set up a group working on different aspects of the Large Hadron Collider at the National Center for Physics. Due to his efforts, in 2000 Pakistan Atomic Energy Commission (led by nuclear physicist Dr. Ishfaq Ahmad) signed an agreement with CERN. This agreement opened the door for Pakistani physicists to collaborate with CERN's particle physics project. His current research area is the development of gaseous detectors for the hadron collider.

== Research paper ==
- The SESAME Project, Hafeez R Hoorani, SESAME.
- CMS Production Meeting, Dr. Hafeez R. Hoorani, National Center for Physics
- Data Acquisition System for RPC Testing, by Ijaz Ahmed, Waqar Ahmed, M. Hamid Ansari, M Irfan Asghar, Sajjad Asghar, Imran M Awan, Jamila B. Butt, Hafeez R. Hoorani, Ishtiaq Hussain Taimoor Khurshid, Saleh Muhammad. Printed in Cern
- Quality Assurance Tests of the CMS Endcap RPCs by Ijaz Ahmed, Waqar Ahmed, M. Hamid Ansari, M Irfan Asghar, Sajjad Asghar, Imran M Awan, Jamila B. Butt, Hafeez R. Hoorani, Ishtiaq Hussain Taimoor Khurshid, Saleh Muhammad. Printed in Cern.
- Physics of Top Quark at LHC, Dr. Hafeez R. Hoorani.
- Assembly and Testing of RPCs in Pakistan, Dr. Hafeez Hoorani, National Center for Physics.
- How to do Physics Analysis of LHC Data?, Dr. H.R. Hoorani, National Center for Physics.

== Online lectures ==
- Hoorani, Hafeez R. (16 December 2004). "First School on LHC Physics" (PDF). National Center for Physics (NCP) and Quaid-i-Azam University (Qau). Archived from the original (PDF) on 7 October 2011.
- Hoorani, Hafeez R. (12–24 October 2009). "PYTHIA -AN EVENT GENERATOR" (PDF). National Center for Physics (NCP). Archived from the original (PDF) on 7 October 2011.
- Hoorani, Hafeez R. (12–24 October 2009). "The Large Hadron Collider (LHC)" (PDF). National Center for Physics (NCP). Archived from the original (PDF) on 7 October 2011.
