= Masud Ahmad =

Pakistani theoretical physicist (1943–2018)

Masud Ahmad HI SI
- Born: 16 November 1943; Lahore, Pakistan
- Died: 29 December 2018 (aged 75); Islamabad, Pakistan
- Citizenship: Pakistan
- Education: Punjab University; Imperial College London
- Known for: Nuclear physics Nuclear Deterrent Program; Quantum electrodynamics Inelastic neutron scattering Mand-Ahmad scattering
- Awards: Hilal-i-Imtiaz (1998) by the President of Pakistan; Chagai Medal (1998); Sitara-i-Imtiaz (1998)
- Scientific career
- Fields: Theoretical physics
- Institutions: Pakistan Atomic Energy Commission; International Atomic Energy Agency; International Centre for Theoretical Physics; Quaid-i-Azam University; Pakistan Institute of Nuclear Science and Technology (PINSTECH); National Center for Theoretical Physics
- Doctoral advisor: Abdus Salam
- Other academic advisors: Riazuddin

Muhammad Masud Ahmad HI SI (Urdu: محمد مسعود احمد), best known as Masood Ahmad, (16 November 1943 – 29 December 2018) was a Pakistani theoretical physicist and ICTP laureate known for his work in dual resonance and Veneziano model, a strings sting mathematically described the fundamental forces and forms of matter in quantum state.

Having specialised in Quantum and Statistical physics, Ahmad assisted and took part in the development of atomic bomb project as a member of Theoretical Physics Group in the 1970s, and participated in the development of the atomic bomb programme.

A staunch supporter of nuclear power, Ahmad has led Pakistan's delegation in many international and national forums and conferences in the issues of peaceful use of nuclear energy. A student of Abdus Salam, Ahmad was one of the senior scientists, despite his age, of Theoretical Physics Group – a physics group that was mandated to develop the designs of nuclear weapons.

== Biography ==
Born and educated in Lahore, British India, Masud Ahmad attended Punjab University in 1960, and completed his BSc degree in Physics under the contemporary supervision of Riazuddin, followed by MSc degree in Mathematical physics from the same institution in 1966. Ahmad then travelled to United Kingdom and attended Imperial College London where he began his doctoral studies under Abdus Salam's physics group. In 1968, he did his DSc degree in Theoretical physics under Abdus Salam. His dissertation dealt with the theory of Chiral symmetry and algebraic representation in Veneziano model – an early theory of stings.

Masud Ahmad's lifelong friendship with Riazuddin was very important for Masud's scientific and philosophical development. It was Riazuddin who arranged summer stay with Ishfaq Ahmad in Islamabad for young Ahmad, thus orienting his science career in nuclear physics. Ahmad spent two years at Institute of Physics (IP) of Quaid-i-Azam University where he worked under Faheem Hussain's Theoretical Physics Group.

At IP, he published the theoretical work on Veneziano Model where he had used the Compton scattering to investigate Pions behaviour on the Veneziano Model. In 1970, along with Fayyazuddin, he carried out the work on construction of Veneziano representation for pion photoproduction amplitude, in which he predicted that, keeping the π and the ρ trajectories, the zero-free parameter fits for the sum and the difference of the differential cross sections for unpolarised photons and the asymmetry function Σ(π^{+}+π^{−}) are obtained.

Prior to the discovery of Alfvén wave in hydromagnetics in 1969, Ahmad was engaged as a theoretical physicist, working in the fields of quantum, molecular, and nuclear physics. In 1970, on an advice of Abdus Salam, Ahmad went to Italy to join International Centre for Theoretical Physics (ICTP) to pursue his further doctoral studies. In 1971, he was joined by Riazuddin and Abdus Salam where he contributed with them in an emerging theory of Quantum electrodynamics.

== Pakistan Atomic Energy Commission ==
After becoming an ICTP Associate, Ahmad was one of the young and senior scientists who were working in the ICTP. In January 1972, Abdus Salam called one of his eminent students from Italy to report to Pakistan Atomic Energy Commission's chairman Munir Ahmad Khan. He, along with Raziuddin Siddiqui and Riazuddin formed the Theoretical Physics Group (TPG) in PAEC, which was mandated to develop the theoretical designs of Pakistan's nuclear weapons.

By 1973, the theoretical physicists from academic universities of Pakistan joined the Theoretical Physics Group, and initiated to work on developing the designs of the weapon. The Theoretical Physics Group directly reported to Abdus Salam who coordinated the research on metallurgy, weapon chemical lenses, enrichment, separation and reprocessing of the fuel.

In 1980, the TPG completed the calculations on how much radiation would be lost during the process of deuterium burning and, in 1982, the final design of the weapon was completed by Theoretical Physics Group (TPG). Under the leadership of PAEC chairman Munir Ahmad Khan, the TPG's theoretical designed bomb was successfully cold tested, codename Kirana-I, in 1983 near at the Kirana Hills. Masud Ahmad, and Riazuddin, had developed the capabilities for more advanced designs of a nuclear device, and reportedly gave the any designs of the nuclear device in a month to PAEC. Since then he has been staying at PAEC as a theoretical physicist. It was Ahmad and Riazuddin's indigenously theoretically designed nuclear devices that Pakistan under Munir Ahmad Khan tested several cold tests from 1983 to 1990. Masud Ahmad was one of the invited scientists who participated and eye-witnessed the country's first successful tests, codename Chagai-I, on 28 May 1998, and second test, codename Chagai-II, on 30 May 1998. He was also a part of team of theoretical physicists who led the calculations of nuclear weapons yield in both places. The Theoretical Physics Group continued to develop more advanced designs for the nuclear weapons, and the FNPG kept the testings of the designs from 1983 to 1991.

== Support for peaceful use of nuclear energy ==
He was a vocal supporter of Pakistan's nuclear energy programme, and has been assisting the Government of Pakistan to established commercial and licensed nuclear power plants in the country. He has also played an important role in IAEA's nuclear policy to allow Pakistan to build nuclear power plants. He has assisted PAEC chairman Parvez Butt to reach a civilian nuclear technology agreement with IAEA. In an honorary conference along with PAEC chairman Parvez Butt and IAEA's delegation, Masud Ahmad said:

"There is an urgent need to disseminate related information on radioisotope based analytical techniques to end user institutions engaged in mitigation of marine pollution. The unplanned disposal of untreated industrial, domestic and agricultural wastes into seawater has led to contamination of the coastal areas of many developing countries in South Asia resulting into considerable increase in the concentration of toxic elements".

In the end, Masud Ahmad concluded that: "The Pakistan Atomic Energy Commission or PAEC is a pioneer organisation in the peaceful uses of radiation and radioisotope techniques in the country in the field of life sciences, hydrology, agriculture and industry and it has acquired significant expertise and infrastructure in the field of environmental isotope ecology".

== Awards ==
- Hilal-i-Imtiaz (1998)
- Chagai Medal (1998)
- Sitara-i-Imtiaz (1998)
- Khwarizmi International Award (2000)

== Publications ==
=== Conference papers ===
- "A Science Oddyssey: Pakistan's Nuclear Emergence, Dr. Samar Mubarakmand, Dr. Khalil Qureshi, Dr. Masoor Beg, Dr. Masud Ahmad".

=== Research papers ===
- Effects of Hall current on unsteady MHD flows of a second grade fluid, Central European Journal of Physics, by Masud Ahmad, Haider Zaman, Naila Rehman
- Riazuddin, as I know him, One Day Conference in Honour of Professor Riazuddin, National University of Sciences and Technology.
- Pion Photoproduction in the Veneziano Model by Masud Ahmad and Fayyazuddin. Published 1 December 1970 at Institute of Physics, University of Islamabad.
- Veneziano Model for Compton Scattering of Pions by Masud Ahmad, Fayyazuddin, and Riazuddin – Published 1 January 1970.
- Algebraic Realization of Chiral Symmetry and Veneziano Model by Fayyazuddin, Riazuddin, and Masud Ahmad. Published 14 July 1969.
- Charge (Z)- and Z/β-threshold values of some track detectors: Measurements and use in nuclear reaction studies, Hameed Ahmed Khan; Naeem AhmadKhan; Masood Ahmad. PINSTECH Nuclear Physics Division, PINSTECH.
- N.A. Khan; S. Mubarakmand; Mahmud Ahmad (19 February 1973). "Aspects of α-emission from the bombardment of 58Ni with 14.7 MeV neutrons". Nuclear Physics A. 202 (1): 123–126. Bibcode:1973NuPhA.202..123K. doi:10.1016/0375-9474(73)90245-5.
- Cross-section measurements with a neutron generator by Samar Mubarakmand, Masud Ahmad, M. Anwar and M. S. Chaudhry. (1977)
- On measuring the absolute emission rates of 14 MeV neutrons by associated, particle counting, by Masud Ahmad and M. S. Chaudhary, Methods of nuclear instrumentation (1975).

== See also ==
- Riazuddin (physicist)
- Abdus Salam
