= RNCP =

RNCP may refer to:

- National Centre for Physics, academic physics and mathematical sciences national research institute located in Islamabad;
- Répertoire national des certifications professionnelles, French National Repertory of Vocational Certifications.
