= Riazuddin (physicist) =

Pakistani theoretical physicist (1930–2013)

- ریاض الدین
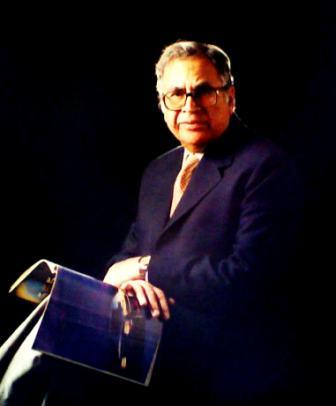
- Portrait of Riazuddin
- Born: 10 November 1930; Ludhiana, Punjab Province, British India
- Died: 9 September 2013 (aged 82); Islamabad, Pakistan
- Citizenship: Pakistan
- Education: Punjab University; Cambridge University
- Known for: Kawarabayashi-Suzuki-Riazuddin-Fayyazuddin (KSRF) relation Pakistan's nuclear weapons and nuclear deterrence programmes Work on Neutrino Physics
- Scientific career
- Fields: Theoretical Physics
- Workplaces: Pakistan Atomic Energy Commission (PAEC); International Center for Theoretical Physics (ICTP); European Organization for Nuclear Research (CERN); Daresbury Laboratory; Quaid-e-Azam University; Punjab University; King Fahd University of Petroleum and Minerals; University of Iowa; Virginia Polytechnic Institute and State University; University of Rochester; University of Maryland; National University of Sciences and Technology (NUST); Pakistan Institute of Engineering & Applied Sciences (PIEAS)
- Doctoral advisor: Abdus Salam
- Notable students: Masud Ahmad

Notes
- Brother of the theoretical physicist Fayyazuddin.

Riazuddin (Note: Punjabi/Urdu: ریاض الدین) (10 November 1930 – 9 September 2013) was a Pakistani theoretical physicist, specialising in high-energy physics and nuclear physics. He is considered one of the early pioneers of Pakistan's nuclear weapons development and atomic deterrence development. Starting his scientific research in 1958, he served as the director of the Theoretical Physics Group (TPG) of the Pakistan Atomic Energy Commission (PAEC) from 1974 until 1984. Riazuddin was a pupil of Abdus Salam, a Nobel laureate in Physics.

Riazuddin carried out his research at the International Centre for Theoretical Physics (ICTP), PAEC, the European Organization for Nuclear Research (CERN) and Daresbury Laboratory where he published papers in mathematics and physics. Riazuddin also played an important role in education in Pakistan, contributing to the rise of science in Pakistan. Riazuddin authored several scientific books on particle physics and quantum mechanics. Later in his life, he joined the National University of Sciences and Technology (NUST) as a visiting professor of theoretical physics.

== Biography ==
=== Early years ===
Riazuddin was born in 1930 into a Punjabi family in Ludhiana, British Punjab. After the Partition of India, his family migrated to Pakistan in 1947 and settled in Lahore. He is the twin brother of physicist Fayyazuddin. At age 17, Riazuddin attended Punjab University, and took his BSc (Hons) in mathematics under the supervision of Abdus Salam in 1951. Riazuddin also studied under the supervision of Abdus Salam at the Postgraduate level at Cambridge University. As a student of mathematics, he learned the advanced course on quantum mechanics under Abdus Salam, as he had made the course of quantum mechanics outside the regular curriculum. In 1951, Salam funded his scholarship, and helped him gain admission to the graduate school of Punjab University. In 1953, Salam supervised his MSc in applied mathematics where his master's dissertation dealt with fundamental concepts of mathematical physics. By the time he published his thesis in 1953, he received a Gold medal from the Punjab University for post-graduate contributions to physics and mathematics.

With the help of Salam, Riazuddin went to the United Kingdom on a scholarship and attended University of Cambridge. At Cambridge, he was awarded his PhD in Theoretical physics in 1959. Riazuddin's dissertation was written on "Charge Radius of Pion" which also covered many issues relevant to the field of quantum theory. Riazuddin returned to Pakistan where he joined Punjab University as an associate professor. In 1968, Riazuddin was awarded the Gold Medal in Physical Sciences for scientists under 40 years of age by the Pakistan Academy of Sciences.

=== Academic career ===
Riazuddin had joined Punjab University in 1959 as an associate professor of mathematics. Four years later, he travelled to the United States for a fellowship awarded by Norman March and Michael Duff. He became a research associate professor at the University of Rochester where he stayed until 1965. The same year, he joined the University of Pennsylvania where he taught physics until 1966. Later, he went to Chicago, Illinois where he joined his twin brother Fayyazuddin, and theoretical physicists Faheem Hussain and Peter Rottoli. Riazuddin joined University of Chicago's Enrico Fermi Institute where they created the "Relativity Group". In 1968, Riazuddin returned to Pakistan on the request of Salam, and joined Quaid-i-Azam University's Institute of Physics. He was the founding director of the Institute of Physics (IP) where he engaged in research on string theory, the theory of relativity, particle physics and nuclear physics. Later, the scientists of the Relativity Group at the Enrico Fermi Institute returned to Pakistan on the request of Salam. In 1970, he returned to the United States, where he became professor of mathematics at the University of Maryland. Riazuddin left the United States for Italy as Salam asked him to join the International Centre for Theoretical Physics in 1970. He was joined there by other students of Salam, and they created a theoretical physics group at the ICTP. In 1971, Riazuddin traveled to the United Kingdom to join the Daresbury Nuclear Physics Laboratory, where he was joined by Michael Duff. At Daresbury, he became senior research associate. There, Riazuddin gained expertise, specialised in nuclear physics, and trained British scientists in the field of nuclear physics.

In 1981, he became visiting professor of physics and mathematics at the University of Iowa and Virginia Polytechnic Institute and State University, now Virginia Tech. In 1982, Riazuddin came back to Pakistan, where he joined Quaid-e-Azam University as a professor of theoretical physics. In 1982, Riazuddin also went to Saudi Arabia, where he joined King Fahd University of Petroleum and Minerals and became chairman of the Department of Mathematics and Statistics and also taught physics at the Department of Physics. In 1983, Riazuddin, along with Asghar Qadir, went to Trieste, Italy, to join the International Centre for Theoretical Physics. Both scientists joined Salam, and they continued research in their fields. In 1998, Riazuddin left King Fahd University of Petroleum and Minerals and returned to Pakistan to rejoin PAEC.

=== Scientific research ===
During his post-graduate research, Riazuddin made contributions to mathematical physics, as he was highly interested in complex mathematical series, and its relation to modern physics. In 1959, Riazuddin was the first physicist to use the dispersion relation for Compton scattering of virtual photons on pions to analyse their charge radius. For this contribution, he was awarded the doctorate in physics (theoretical) by Cambridge University. He seldom published papers, preferring long correspondences with his brother Fayyazuddin, mentor Abdus Salam, and colleagues including Asghar Qadir, Michael Duff, and Masud Ahmad. During the 1960s, he associated himself with complex mathematical applications of nuclear physics. In 1960, Riazuddin used Nucleon-nucleon dispersion relation to discriminate proton-proton scattering in pseudoscalar mesons. In 1965, Riazuddin carried out the pioneering work on vector currents, in which he showed the discrepancy between μ-decay and the constant gravity, and the strong interaction renormalisation of the Beta (β)-decay.

The same year, the U.S. Atomic Energy Commission, partnering with the Pakistan Atomic Energy Commission, sponsored Riazuddin to undertake further research. Along with Munir Ahmad Rashid and Fayyazuddin, Riazuddin realised that the physical baryons are considered broken in special unitary groups, symmetric groups and the tensor product. The relevant papers were submitted at the United States Atomic Energy Commission. In 1967, at the Fermi Institute, Riazuddin, with his brother Fayyazuddin, carried out research in the field of current algebra, where they applied the mathematical framework of current algebra in the applications of radiative decays of mesons.

In 1982, Riazuddin and Fayyazuddin published a pioneering work on K mesons. Riazuddin postulated that radioactive decay in K mesons have almost vanished when chiral symmetry is introduced. After the introduction, the symmetries break the Standard Model of particle physics, even when the contribution from penguin diagrams is included.

From 1972, Riazuddin made pioneering research on neutrinos— an elusive particle postulated by Wolfgang Pauli in 1930. In 1972, Riazuddin and Fayyazuddin were the first to post mathematical frameworks of Current-algebra in neutrino scattering to determine the Scale invariance of Chiral symmetry breaking the Hamiltonian Quantum Mechanics. In 1987, Riazuddin and Fayyazuddin theorised that it is possible get light-neutrino masses in the range of a few electron volts by equalising the masses of superheavy neutrinos in background independence (universality).

In 2000, Riazuddin began his research in the series unsolved problems in physics. In 2005, at the National Center for Physics (NCP), Riazuddin presented his papers on neutrinos where he provided the mathematical framework of the neutrinos. Neutrinos have heavier masses but the neutrino oscillations do not completely identify the overall scale of their exact masses because they are exceedingly tiny. To determine the exact masses, Riazuddin introduced the laws of limits, as he realised there was a limit, to the electron energy spectra in tritium β-decay. In 2007, Riazuddin introduced SU(3) symmetry in the theory of double beta decay. He postulated the light neutrinos formed a triplet state in a SU(3) symmetry during the process. In 2008, Riazuddin pointed out that the neutrino mass has μ and τ symmetry and the Lepton number remains constant, a new type of Seesaw mechanism is formed, the so-called Riazuddin's Seesaw Model, the Dirac mass matrix provided the Yukawa coupling to follow the Majorana fermion to satisfy the Leptogenesis asymmetry. Riazuddin proposed that this interaction can be avoided when two of the heavy right-hand neutrinos are (nearly) degenerate.

In 2009, Riazuddin published a mathematical theory of the non-standard model, and its brief extensions to τ (tau) particles – particles that are similar to electrons with negative electric charge. In an experiment performed at the Synchrotron light source installed at the National Center for Physics (NCP), now the Abdus Salam Centre for Physics, Riazuddin observed the decay of the Tau particle, in which he theorised that hadronisation vector currents and axial vectors can be used to study the implicit properties and functions of hadronic resonances, together with Chiral symmetry. These natural elements can be assigned to the parts' weak current that the strong nuclear interaction conserves. With the introduction of such elementary particles, it became critical to study the particle elements that hold the weak interaction.

== 1971 war and atomic bomb project ==
During his stay at PAEC, Riazuddin and Fayyazuddin were central figures of Pakistan's atomic program during the early and critical years. In December 1972, Riazuddin returned to Pakistan on the request of Salam. Salam asked Riazuddin to report to Munir Ahmad Khan – chairman of the Pakistan Atomic Energy Commission at that time. At PAEC, Salam assigned Riazuddin to his Theoretical Physics Group (TPG). The Theoretical Physics Group took research in fast neutron calculations – how neutrons moved in a nuclear chain reaction – the theory simultaneity — how would fission weapon would detonated from several points at the same point during the detonation process – and hydrodynamics – how the explosion produced by a chain reaction might behave – and what kind of and how much fissile material and reflectors would be used. Salam had attracted theoretical physicists who worked under Riazuddin despite his younger age. Riazuddin was among the scientists who attended the Multan meeting that was managed by Salam and convened by Pakistan President Zulfikar Ali Bhutto. After the meeting, Salam took Riazuddin, with Munir Ahmad Khan, to Bhutto's residence in Islamabad where the scientists briefed Bhutto about the development of the nuclear weapons programme.

Although Salam had traveled to the United States to evade the Indo-Pakistani war of 1971, he returned to Pakistan with stacks of historical books on the Manhattan Project in December 1971. In December 1973, the University of Maryland offered him a fellowship, and on the advice of Salam, Riazuddin went to United States. There, he became a senior research scientist at the University of Maryland, and obtained the open-source information on the "Manhattan Project" from the Library of Congress. Riazuddin carefully studied American theoretical physicist J. Robert Oppenheimer's approach to develop the first implosion device, and made further advances on Tolman–Oppenheimer–Volkoff limit, Oppenheimer–Phillips process, Born–Oppenheimer approximation.

After his return from the United States, Riazuddin was inducted into the Pakistan Atomic Energy Commission (PAEC) as member (technical). In 1974, he began to take research with the TPG, and began one of the pioneering member of the TPG. In 1973, Raziddin Siddiqui formed the Mathematical Physics Group (MPG) which closely collaborated with Theoretical Physics Group. Riazuddin called his mathematician friend Asghar Qadir, who specialised in special relativity under Riazuddin and Salam, to join the Mathematical Physics Group. Later in his career, Qadir published a college text book on theory of special relativity. Shortly after the India surprise nuclear test — Pokhran-I, Munir Ahmad Khan called for a meeting to initiate the work on atomic bomb. Riazuddin and Salam represented the Theoretical Physics Group (TPG), and it was decided to develop the implosion method for the first device. During the meeting, the word "bomb" was never used; instead academic scientists preferred to use the scientific research rationale. The Theoretical Physics Group began its research and directly reported to Abdus Salam.

In 1977, both MPG and TPG scientists completed the design and calculation of an atomic bomb. Along with Qadir, Riazuddin continued to develop the theoretical designs of the atomic weapon during 1978. In 1982 the PAEC finally developed the device under the leadership of Munir Ahmad Khan. The PAEC carried out the first cold-test of the TPG's theoretical design by May 1983 at Kirana Hills. The test teams were headed by Ishfaq Ahmad, a nuclear physicist, and Munir Ahmad Khan supervised the testings.

Riazuddin later disclosed that he worked as part of the team, under Abdus Salam, that worked on designs for Pakistan's nuclear explosive device. As he explained: "We were the designers of the bomb, like the tailor who tells you how much of the material is required to stitch a suit. We had to identify the fissile material, whether to use plutonium or...enriched uranium, which method of detonation, which explosive, which type of tampers and lenses to use, how material will be compressed, how shock waves will be created, what would be the yield.".

Riazuddin also worked in a neutron particle accelerator at PAEC. In 2000, Riazuddin retired from PAEC as a chief scientist. In the same year, he was elected as Fellow of the Third World Academy of Sciences and Fellow of the Islamic World Academy of Sciences (IAS). Riazuddin was also a visiting scientist at CERN.

== Legacy, awards and recognition ==
Riazuddin was an internationally known theoretical physicist. He had made contributions with CERN's Large Hadron Collider (LHC). At CERN, he was a widely respected theoretician.

Riazuddin is the recipient of Pakistan's highest civil awards:

- Tamgha-i-Imtiaz (Medal of Excellence) in 1980
- Sitara-i-Imtiaz (Star of Excellence) in 1990
- Hilal-i-Imtiaz (Crescent of Excellence) in 1999
- UNESCO Albert Einstein Gold Medal for Fundamental Science in 2000
- Fellow of the Islamic Academy of Sciences in November 2000
- Gold Medal for outstanding research work in Physical Sciences by Pakistan Academy of Sciences in 1979

He is one of the Pakistani scientists who were very close to Pakistani Prime Minister Zulfiqar Ali Bhutto and Abdus Salam. At PAEC, Riazuddin had closely worked with another noted Pakistani theoretical physicist Masud Ahmad (late). Later in life, he worked as a professor of theoretical physics and neutrino physics at the National University of Sciences and Technology, in Islamabad.

He had also been the director of the Riazuddin National Center for Physics, also at Quaid-e-Azam University. He was most famous for his TPG Group work Riazuddin and his team of theoretical physicists are widely credited to have developed and designed Pakistan's nuclear weapon devices.

On 26 April 2009, a day-long conference was held in Islamabad to pay tribute to an eminent research scientist and theoretical physicist, Riazuddin. The conference was organised by National University of Sciences and Technology (NUST) and Riazuddin National Centre for Physics (RNCP). In the conference, Masud Ahmad, who is also the student of his, said:

"Prof. Riaz always put in his best efforts to obtain original results while working on various issues related to science and technology".

NUST Rector, Engr. Muhammad Asghar also paid tributes to him and said:

"Prof. Riazuddin has a very strong and professional background in the field of Physics. He achieved many distinctions and awards from national as well as international institutes, which includes Tamgha-e-Imtiaz, Sitara-i-Imtiaz and Hilal-e-Imtiaz and awards from UNESCO, Economic Cooperation Organization and COMSTECH Prize in Physics".

== Institutes named after Riazuddin ==
- Riazuddin National Center for Physics, Quaid-e-Azam University, in Islamabad.

== Publications and scientific articles ==
=== Bibliography ===
- Theory of Weak Interaction in Particle Physics, John Wiley, New York, 1969. (Written jointly with R. E. Marshak and C. P. Ryan).
- Quantum Mechanics, World Scientific, Singapore, 1990. (Written jointly with Fayyazuddin).
- Fayyazuddin; Riazuddin (2011). A Modern Introduction to Particle Physics. World Scientific Publishing. ISBN 9789814338851.
- Contemporary Physics: Proceedings of the International Symposium (written jointly with Faheem Hussain, Jamil Aslam, Riazuddin
- Physics and contemporary needs. Vol.5 by Riazuddin, Asghar Qadir
- Physics and Contemporary Needs. Written and edited by Riazuddin
- Selected Papers of Abdus Salam, with Commentary by A. Ali, Abdus Salam, Fayyazuddin, Riazuddin.
- Modern Introduction to Particle Physics (vol. 2), by Fayyazuddin and Riazuddin
- Radiative D* decay using vector meson dominance by Riazuddin and Fayyazuddin
- On the gluon dipole penguin contribution to nonleptonic hyperon decays. By Riazuddin and N. Paver
- * Mathematical Physics, jointly written with Faheem Hussain, Riazuddin, Asghar Qadir, Mohammad Jamil Aslam, Hamid Saleem.

=== Scientific articles ===
- The Role of Great Equations in Life by Riazuddin, Riazuddin National Center of Physics.
- Tribimaximal mixing and leptogenesis in a seesaw model, Riazuddin, Islamabad.
- Dirac equation in (1+2) dimensions for quasi-particles in graphene and quantum field theory of their Coulomb interaction. Riazuddin, Riazuddin National Center for Physics.
- (SU) × U(1) model for electroweak unification and sterile neutrinos. Jointly written with Riazuddin and Fayyazuddin.
- An SU(3) symmetry for light neutrinos, Riazuddin
- Branching Ratio and CP-asymmetry for B→ gamma decays, jointly written with M. Jamil Aslam and Riazuddin
- Neutrino flavour mixing in an SU(3) symmetry for light neutrinos. Published by Riazuddin
- Neutrinos: recent developments and origin of neutrino mass matrix, Riazuddin (May 2004)
- Role of Mathematics in Physical Sciences, Riazuddin (February 2004)
- Some comments on narrow resonances. By Fayyazuddin and Riazuddin (September 2003)
- Neutrino Mass Matrix with Approximate Flavor Symmetry, Riazuddin (July 2003)
- Particle Aspects of Cosmology and Baryogenesis, Riazuddin (February 2003)
- Role of lepton flavor violating (LFV) muon decay in Seesaw model and LSND by M. Jamil Aslam and Riazuddin(September 2002)
- Role of gauge invariance in B→v gamma radiative weak decays, Riazuddin (October 2001)
- The Σ and τ in D and B decays, jointly written, N. Paver and Riazuddin (July 2001)
- Potential Models for Radiative Rare B Decays, Saeed Ahmad and Riazuddin (January 2001)
- Off-diagonal structure of neutrino mass matrix in see-saw mechanism and electron-muon-tau lepton universality, Riazuddin (July 2000)
- Two body non-leptonic $Lambda_b$ decays in quark model with factorization ansatz, published, Fayyazuddin and Riazuddin (February 1998)
- Double Counting Ambiguities in the Linear Sigma Model by A. Bramon, Riazuddin and M. D. Scadron (September 1997)
- Vector Meson Exchanges and CP Asymmetry in, Riazuddin, N. Paver and F. Simeoni

== See also ==
- Tafazzul Husain Kashmiri
- Abdus Salam
- Pervez Hoodbhoy

== Bibliography ==
- Rahman, Shahid (1998). "§Development of Weapons". In Rahman, Shahid (ed.). Long Road to Chagai. Islamabad, Pakistan: Printwise publication. p. 157. ISBN 969-8500-00-6.
