= Chagai-I =

Pakistan's first nuclear weapons test (1998)

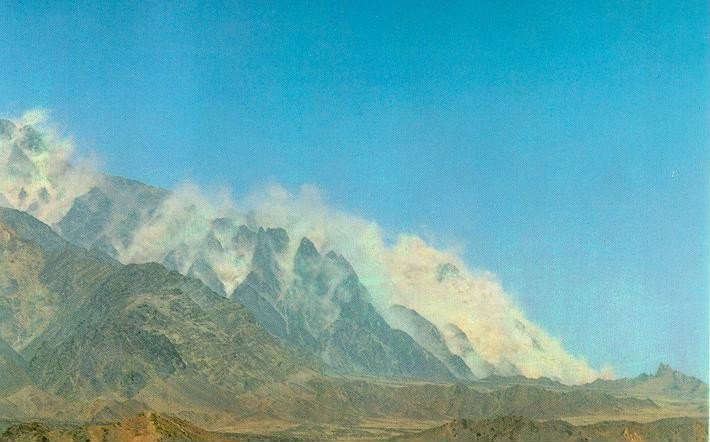
- The dust expulsion from the Ras Koh Hills following the underground nuclear detonation

Information
- Country: Pakistan
- Test site: Ras Koh Hills, Chagai, Balochistan, Pakistan
- Period: 28 May 1998
- Number of tests: 5
- Test type: Underground tests
- Device type: Boosted fission/Fusion
- Max. yield: 40 kilotons of TNT (170 TJ); See note

Test chronology

Chagai-I is the code name of five simultaneous underground nuclear tests conducted by Pakistan on 28 May 1998 at 15:15 PKT. The tests were performed at Ras Koh Hills in the Chagai District of Balochistan Province.

Chagai-I was Pakistan's first public test of nuclear weapons. Its timing was a direct response to India's second nuclear test Pokhran-II, on 11 and 13 May 1998. These tests by Pakistan and India resulted in United Nations Security Council Resolution 1172 and economic sanctions on both states by a number of major powers, particularly the United States and Japan. By testing nuclear devices, Pakistan became the seventh country to publicly test nuclear weapons. Pakistan's second nuclear test, Chagai-II, followed on 30 May 1998.

28 May, the day of the nuclear test, is referred to as Youm-e-Takbir in Pakistan; it is celebrated as a national holiday commemorating Pakistan's emergence as a nuclear power.

== Background ==
Several historical and political events and personalities in the 1960s and early 1970s led Pakistan to gradually transition to a program of nuclear weapons development, which began in 1972. Plans for nuclear weapons testing started in 1974. Chagai-I was the result of over two decades of planning and preparation, with Pakistan becoming the seventh of eight states that have publicly admitted to testing nuclear weapons.

The timing of Chagai-I was a direct response to India's second nuclear tests, Pokhran-II, also called Operation Shakti, on 11 and 13 May 1998. Chagai-I was Pakistan's first of two public tests of nuclear weapons. Pakistan's second nuclear test, Chagai-II, followed on 30 May 1998.

In 2005, Benazir Bhutto testified, "Pakistan may have had an atomic device long before, and her father had told her from his prison cell that preparations for a nuclear test had been made in 1977, and he expected to have an atomic test of a nuclear device in August 1977." However, the plan was moved on to December 1977, and later it was delayed indefinitely to avoid international reaction, thus obtaining deliberate ambiguity. In an interview with Hamid Mir in Capital Talk which aired on Geo News in 2005, Dr. Samar Mubarakmand confirmed Bhutto's testimony and maintained that PAEC developed the design of an atomic bomb in 1978 and had successfully conducted a cold test after building the first atomic bomb in 1983.

== Location ==
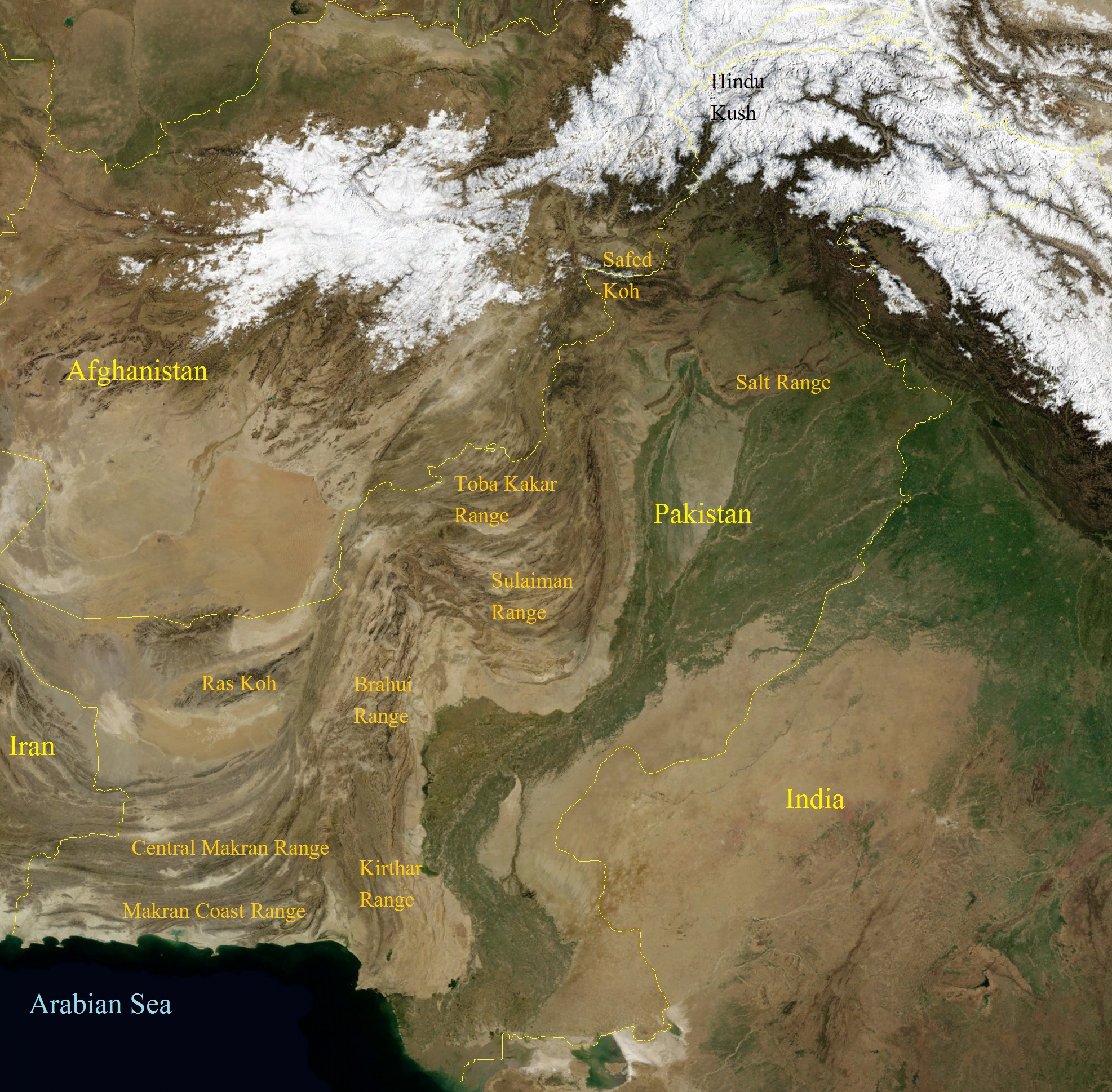
PAEC's scientists chose sites at the high-altitude granite mountain ranges with extreme hot weather.

Safety and security required a remote, isolated and unpopulated mountainous area. The Geological Survey of Pakistan (GSP) conducted tests to select a "bone dry" mountain capable of withstanding a 20–40 kilotonne (kt) detonation from the inside. The scientists wanted dry weather, and very little wind to spread radioactive fallout.

Koh Kambaran located in the Ras Koh Hills was selected in 1978. Due to widespread imprecise reporting which mentioned the Chagai Hills region prior to the actual explosion, there is sometimes geographic confusion. Both the Chagai Hills and the Ras Koh Hills are situated in the Chagai District, but the Ras Koh Hills lie to the south of Chagai Hills, and are separated from the Chagai Hills by a large valley.

Throughout the 1980s, the Governor of Balochistan, General Rahimuddin Khan, led the civil engineering work.

== Decision-making ==
After India's Pokhran-II tests on 11–13 May 1998, statements by Indian politicians further escalated the situation. Prime Minister Nawaz Sharif curtailed his state visit to Kazakhstan to meet with President Nursultan Nazarbayev and returned to Pakistan.

The decision to conduct tests took place at a meeting that Sharif convened with the Chairman joint chiefs, General Jehangir Karamat, Dr. Abdul Qadeer Khan, Ishfaq Ahmad, and Munir Ahmad Khan and members of the Cabinet of Pakistan. In talks with Sharif, US president Bill Clinton offered a lucrative aid package in an attempt to get Pakistan to refrain from nuclear testing, and sent high level civic-military delegations led by Strobe Talbott and General Anthony Zinni to Pakistan to lobby against the tests. Popular public opinion in Pakistan was in favor of nuclear blasts. Information minister Mushahid Hussain was the first who argued for the tests in reply to the Indian nuclear tests. The Opposition leader, Benazir Bhutto, spoke emphatically in favour of Pakistani atomic tests.

At the NSC's cabinet meeting, the Pakistani government, military, scientific, and civilian officials were participating in a debate, broadening, and complicating the decision-making process. Chairman joint chiefs, General Karamat and Air chief ACM (General) Parvaiz Mehdi Qureshi supported the matter and left the decision on the government. Naval chief Admiral Fasih Bokhari and Finance Minister Sartaj Aziz argued against the tests on financial grounds; though Aziz later staunchly backed the decision to test calling it as "right decision." Dr. Abdul Qadeer Khan argued in favor of tests and was supported by Samar Mubarakmand and Munir Ahmad Khan while Dr. Ishfaq Ahmad argued that "the decision to test or not to test was that of the Government of Pakistan despite the say of the scientific community." Concluding the final arguments, Ishfaq Ahmad said: "Mr. Prime Minister, take a decision and, Insha'Allah, I give you the guarantee of success".

With the G8 group's sanctions having very little effect on India and skepticism towards United States commitment, the Pakistani government economists built up the final consensus hardening around the idea that "there is no economic price for security". Despite being under pressure by president Clinton, Prime Minister Sharif authorized the nuclear tests by ordering the PAEC in Urdu: "Dhamaka kar dein" (lit. "Conduct the explosion!")

In May 1998, a C-130 aircraft with four escorting F-16 Falcon jets secretly flew the completely knocked down sub-assembly nuclear devices from Rawalpindi to Chagai.

In 1999, in an interview given to Pakistani and Indian journalists in Islamabad, Sharif said: If India had not exploded the bomb, Pakistan would not have done so. Once New Delhi did so, We [Sharif Government] had no choice because of public pressure.

== Weapon yield ==
The PAEC weapon testing team at Koh Kambaran, with team leader Samar Mubarakmand (right of the man in the blue beret), Tariq Salija, Irfan Burney, and Tasneem Shah. The better known A. Q. Khan of Kahuta Research Laboratories (KRL) is left of the man in the blue beret (who may be General Zulfikar Ali).

The Pakistan Atomic Energy Commission (PAEC) carried out five underground nuclear tests at the Chagai test site at 1515 hours (PKT) on the afternoon of 28 May 1998.

The observation post was established about 10 km (≈6.21 miles) from the test vicinity, with members of Mathematics Group and Theoretical Physics Group (TPG) led by Dr. Masud Ahmad and Asghar Qadir charged with calculating the nuclear weapon yield. Determination of accurate and precise blast yields and shock waves is challenging because there are different ways in which the yields can be determined. The TPG predicted the total maximum test yields with an energy equivalent to be ~40 kilotons of TNT equivalent, with the largest (boosted) device yielding 30–36 kilotons. Other scientists estimated a yield of 6–13 kilotons or, based on the seismic wave data, a yield of 12–20 kt. Theoretical Physics Group (TPG) and Dr. Abdul Qadeer Khan held to their estimates. The PAEC's mathematics division placed the scientific data in the public domain and published seismic activities, mathematical graphs, and mathematical formulas used to calculate the yield; though certain scientific information remains classified.

From scientific data received by PAEC, it appears that Pakistan did not test a thermonuclear device, as opposed to India. According to Ishfaq Ahmad, PAEC had no plans to develop a hydrogen device for economic reasons, even though back in 1974, Riazuddin proposed such a plan to Abdus Salam, Director of Theoretical Physics Group that time. From the outset, PAEC concentrated on developing smaller tactical nuclear weapons easily installed on Pakistan Air Force (PAF) aircraft, Pakistan Navy combatant vessels, and missiles.

Shortly after the tests, former chairman and technical director Munir Ahmad Khan famously quoted: "These boosted devices are like a half way stage towards a thermonuclear bomb. They use elements of the thermonuclear process, and are effectively stronger atom bombs..... Pakistan has had a nuclear capability since 1984 and all the Pakistani devices were made with enriched uranium."

On the other hand, Abdul Qadeer Khan further provided technical details on fission devices while addressing the local media as he puts it: "All boosted fission devices using Uranium 235 on 28 May. None of these explosions were thermonuclear, we are doing research and can do a fusion test if asked. But it depends on the circumstances, political situation and the decision of the government. As opposed to India's thermonuclear approach, Dr. N. M. Butt, senior scientist, stated that "PAEC built a sufficient number of neutron bombs— a battlefield weapon that is essentially a low yield device".

== Reactions ==
In Pakistan, the news of the nuclear detonations was met by street celebrations. Prime Minister Nawaz Sharif addressed the nation via the state owned channel Pakistan Television (PTV), congratulated the public and days of celebration followed throughout Pakistan. The Directorate of Technical Development of PAEC which carried out the Chagai tests issued the following statement soon after the tests:

The mission has, on the one hand, boosted the morale of the Pakistani nation by giving it an honorable position in the nuclear world, while on the other hand it validated scientific theory, design and previous results from cold tests. This has more than justified the creation and establishment of DTD more than 20 years back.

Through these critical years of nuclear device development, the leadership contribution changed hands from Munir Ahmad Khan to Ishfaq Ahmad and finally to Samar Mubarakmand.

These gifted scientists and engineers along with a highly dedicated team worked logically and economically to design, produce and test an extremely rugged device for the nation which enable the Islamic Republic of Pakistan from strength to strength.

Pakistan's President Rafiq Tarar declared a state of emergency, which introduced measures to protect Pakistan's finances and currency.

After the test, the national media in Pakistan posted biographies of the involved scientists. Senior scientists and engineers were invited by academic institutes and universities to deliver lectures on mathematical, theoretical, nuclear and particle physics. The institutes bestowed hundreds of silver medals, gold medallions and honorary doctorates to the scientists and engineers in 1998.

=== International ===
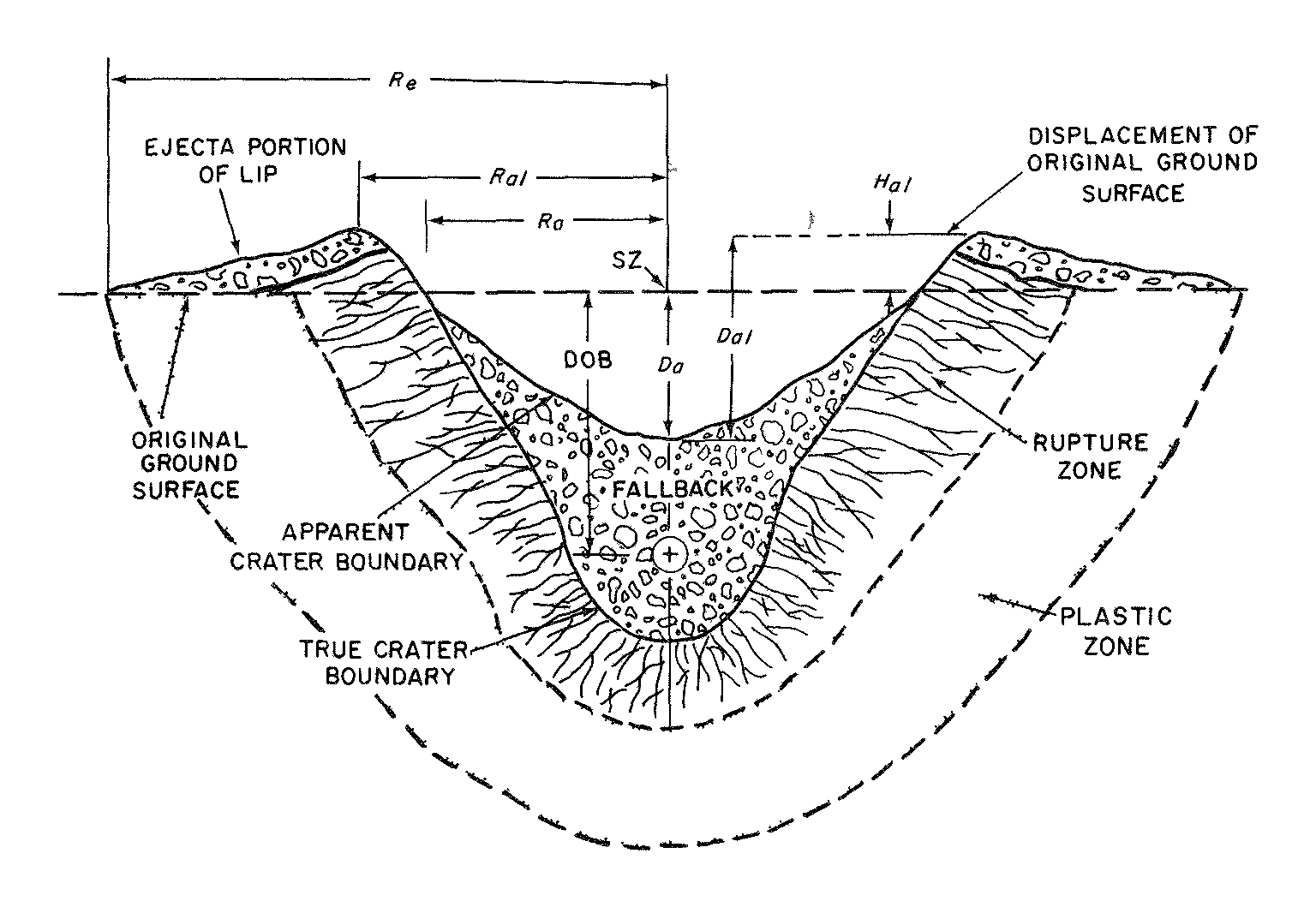
Cross section of a crater from a subsurface nuclear detonation

The Chagai-I tests were condemned by the European Union, the United States, Japan, Iraq, and by many non-Organisation of Islamic Cooperation (OIC) countries. The United Nations Security Council adopted Resolution 1172, condemning the tests by both India and Pakistan. From 1998 to 1999, the U.S. held a series of talks with Pakistan to persuade them to become party to the Comprehensive Nuclear-Test-Ban Treaty (CTBT) and the Non-Proliferation Treaty (NPT), with Pakistan refusing amid a fear of lack of security commitment by the U.S. and the growing ties between India and the United States.

The U.S., Japan, Australia, Sweden, Canada, and International Monetary Fund (IMF) imposed economic sanctions on Pakistan. All new U.S. economic assistance to Pakistan was suspended in May 1998 though humanitarian aid continued. The composition of assistance to Pakistan shifted from monetary grants towards loans repayable in foreign exchange. In the long term, the sanctions were eventually permanently lifted by the U.S. after Pakistan became a front-line ally in the war against terror in 2001. Having improved its finances, the Pakistani government ended its IMF program in 2004.

Saudi Arabia, Turkey, Azerbaijan, Iran and the Taliban-led Islamic Emirate of Afghanistan congratulated Pakistan where major celebrations took place. Following the tests, Taliban's supreme leader Mullah Omar declared that "Pakistan made the Islamic world proud" and that an "attack on Pakistan would be considered an attack on Afghanistan".

== Commemoration ==
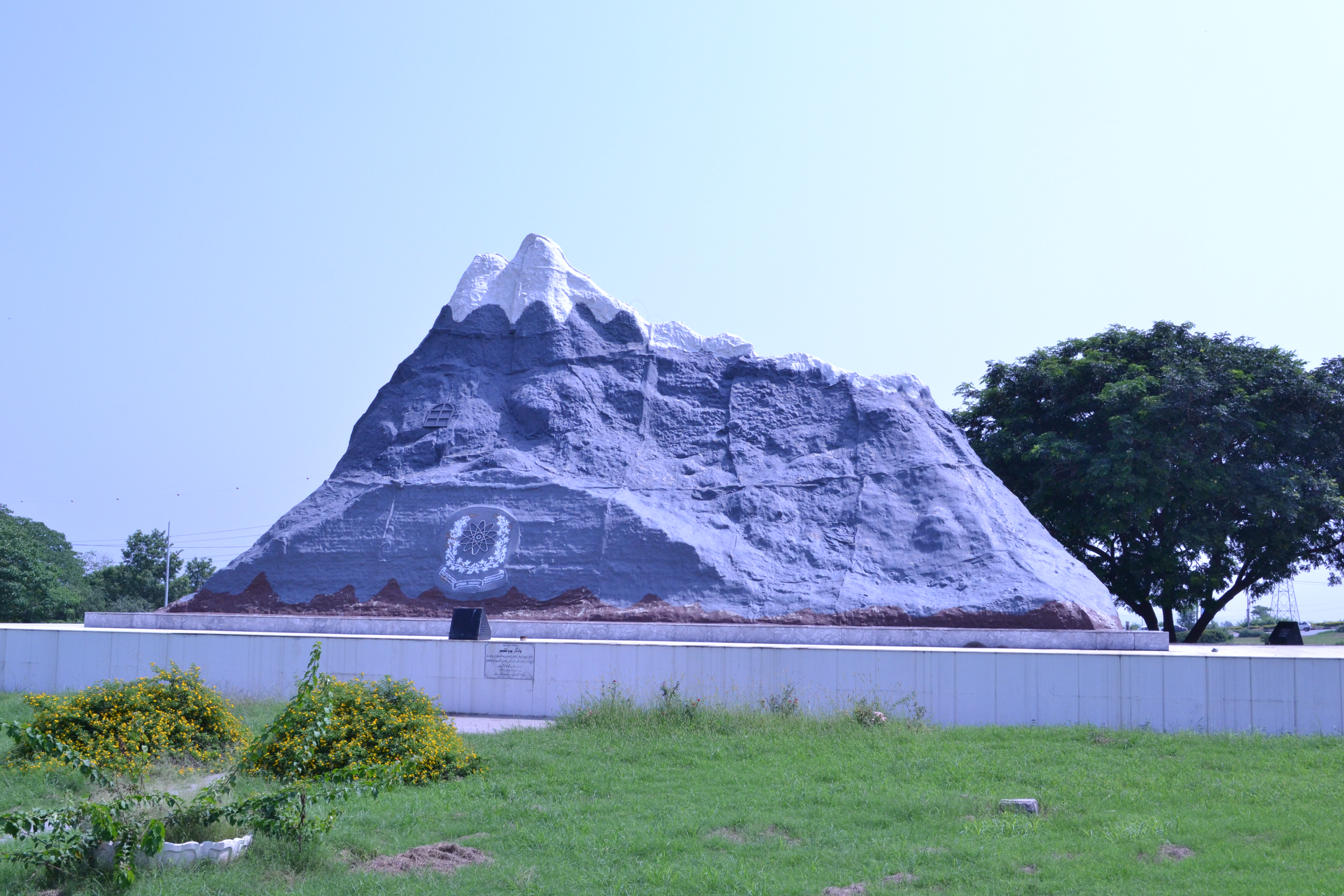
Commemorative monument at the Faizabad Interchange in Islamabad

Signed into law by Prime Minister Nawaz Sharif, 28 May is officially declared as Youm-e-Takbir (lit. Day of Greatness), as well as National Science Day, to commemorate the date of the first five tests and honour the scientific efforts to develop the program. Awards, such as Chagai-Medal, are given to various individuals and industries in the field of science. The Pakistani government established the Chagai-I Medal, first awarded in 1998 to the scientists who witnessed the tests. The granite mountains are visibly shown in the gold medallion and equal ribbon stripes of yellow, red and white.

== See also ==
- Chagai-II
- List of countries with nuclear weapons

== Further information ==
- Khan, Abdul Qadeer (2011). Sehar Honay Tak (in Urdu). Karachi, Pakistan: SMP Language Publishing Co. p. 250. ISBN 978-9693527810.
- Shahid-ur-Rehman (1999). Long Road to Chagai. Islamabad: Printwise Publications. ISBN 9789698500009.
- Yusof, Nordin (1999). Space Warfare: High-tech War of the Future Generation (Cet. 1. ed.). Skudai, Johor Darul Ta'zim, Malaysia: Penerbit Universiti Teknologi Malaysia. p. 860. ISBN 9835201544.
- Jones, Owen Bennett (2003). Pakistan: Eye of the Storm (2nd ed.). New Haven, Conn.: Yale University Press. p. 384. ISBN 0300101473.
- Singh, R.S.N. (2008). The Military Factor in Pakistan. New Delhi: Frankfort, IL. ISBN 978-0981537894.
- Khan, Zafar (2014). Pakistan's Nuclear Policy: A Minimum Credible Deterrence. UK: Routledge. p. 198. ISBN 978-1138778795.
- Bhattacharya, Samir (2014). Nothing But!. New Delhi, India: Partridge Pub. p. 570. ISBN 978-1482817874.
- Datt, Savita (2003). To Chagai and beyond. New Delhi: I.K. International. ISBN 8188237035.
- Nye, Mary Jo (2004). Blackett: Physics, War, and Politics in the Twentieth Century. Cambridge, Mass.: Harvard University Press. ISBN 0674015487.
- University of California, San Diego. "1998 Pakistan underground nuclear tests". eqinfo.ucsd.edu. Broadband Seismic Data Collection Center, University of California, San Diego.
