= Tasneem Muhammad Shah =

Pakistani scientist and mathematician

- Born: Islamabad, West Pakistan
- Citizenship: Pakistan
- Education: Quaid-i-Azam University; Oxford University
- Known for: Pakistan's nuclear deterrence program Chagai nuclear weapons testing Missile Integration Programme; Computational Fluid Dynamics (CFD); Applied Mathematics; Monte Carlo methods
- Scientific career
- Fields: Mathematics
- Workplaces: Kahuta Research Laboratories (KRL); National University of Sciences and Technology (NUST); Air University, Pakistan Air Force; Bahria University (BU); Higher Education Commission (HEC); Karachi University (KU)
- Doctoral advisor: Ronald K. Boldwin

Tasneem Muhammad Shah (Urdu: تسنیم محمد شاه) is a Pakistani scientist and mathematician who is a professor at Preston University. Previously, he was a professor and chairman of the Department of Mathematics at the Air University.

For his studies, he attended the Quaid-i-Azam University before going to the United Kingdom. His doctoral thesis were written on "Analysis of Multi-Grid Methods, design, theory and development of Algo".

Shah has worked at KRL in fluid dynamics for over 20 years.
