= National Centre for Physics =

Pakistan's federally-funded research institute and national laboratory

- ادارہِ عبدالسلام برائے مطالعہِ علومِ طبیعات
- Established: 27 January 1999; 27 years ago
- Budget: Federally-funded
- Field of research: Fundamental science; Physics
- Director: Qaisar Ahsan
- Location: Islamabad, Pakistan
- Collaborations: CERN; ICTP
- Affiliations: Government of Pakistan
- Operating agency: Quaid-i-Azam University
- Website: www.ncp.edu.pk

The National Centre for Physics (Note: Previously known as Riazuddin Centre for Physics.) (NCP) is a federally funded research institute and national laboratory co-located near Quaid-i-Azam University in Islamabad, Pakistan.

Founded in 1999, the site is dedicated to the understanding and advancement of the physical sciences and mathematical logic. It closely collaborates and operates under the quadripartite supervision of International Centre for Theoretical Physics (ICTP) in Italy, CERN in Switzerland, and the Pakistan Atomic Energy Commission (PAEC).

== History ==
=== INSC and INP ===
In 1974, Salam envisaged the need for an institution where experts from industrialised nations and learners from developing countries could gather for a couple of weeks once a year to exchange views on various subjects of current interest in physics and allied sciences. His suggestion was accepted by the chairman of the Pakistan Atomic Energy Commission (PAEC), Munir Ahmad Khan, and in 1976 the International Nathiagali Summer College on Physics and Contemporary Needs (INSC) was inaugurated at Nathiagali, co-sponsored by ICTP and PAEC, under the directorship of Professor Riazuddin, a student of Salam. The same year, Ishfaq Ahmad established the Institute of Nuclear Physics at the University of Engineering and Technology of Lahore, where Salam was invited to give the first lectures on particle physics and quantum mechanics.

Since then, it has been regularly held without break.

=== Foundation ===
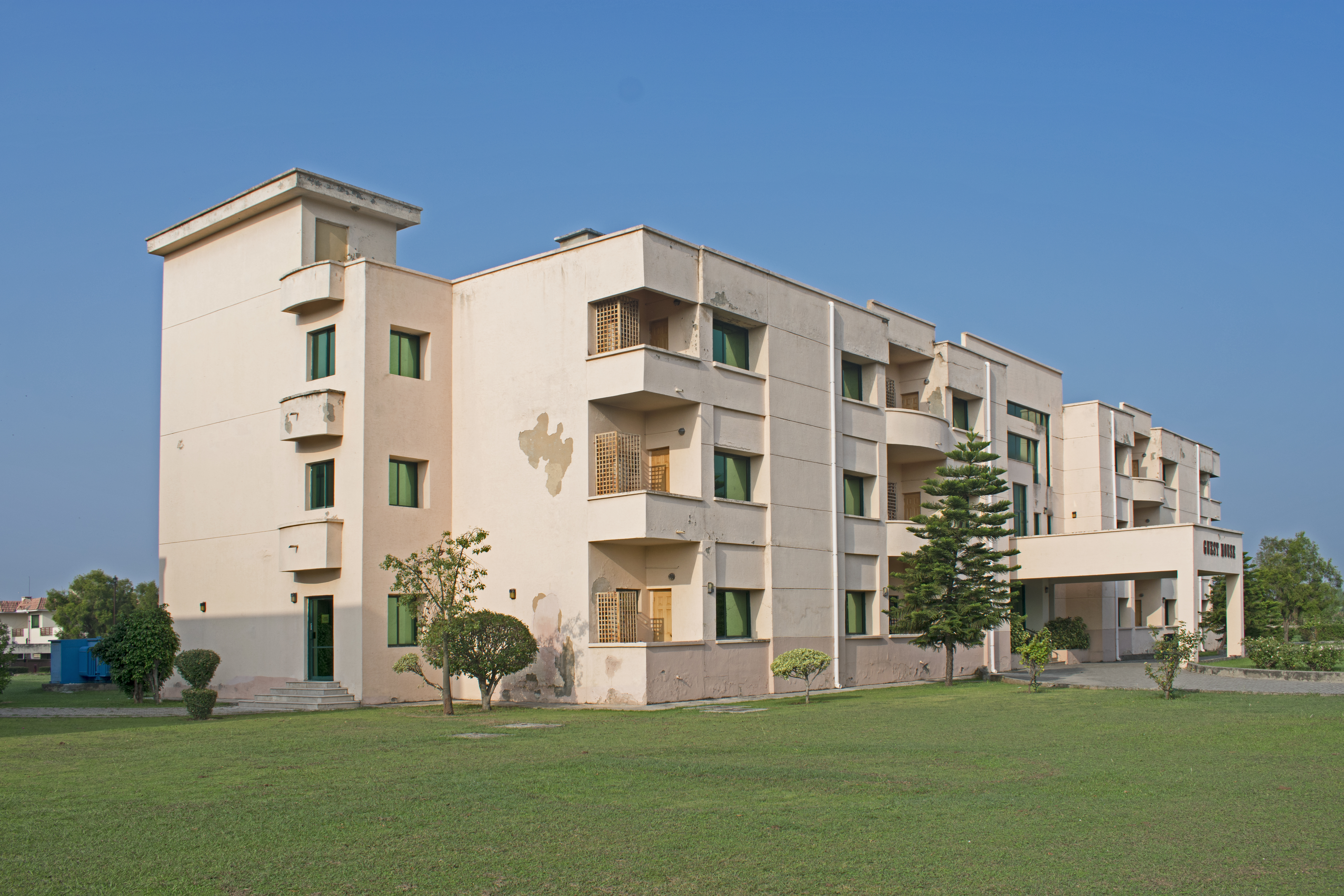
Guesthouse on the campus

The National Centre for Physics was founded after Riazuddin arranged a one-day symposium on Frontiers of Fundamental Physics on 27 January 1999 at the Institute of Physics of Quaid-e-Azam University, seven months after Pakistan's first successful nuclear weapons test. Many leading scientists of Pakistan and some visitors from CERN attended this symposium and provided their support.

Riazuddin was NCP's first director-general, and it was inaugurated by Ishfaq Ahmad, chairman of the Pakistan Atomic Energy Commission during this period, on 16 May 2000. The director general of the European Organization for Nuclear Research (CERN), Luciano Maiani, was among those to witness the inauguration. NCP's first academic faculty included Munir Ahmad Khan, Pervez Hoodbhoy, Fiazuddin, Masud Ahmad, and Ishfaq Ahmad, who first presented papers to the institutes and CERN.

In 2008, Hamid Saleem became its director-general and Riazuddin was made lifetime director general emeritus..

NCP is responsible for research in branches of physics including particle physics, computational physics, astrophysics, cosmology, atmospheric physics, atomic, molecular, and optical physics, chemical physics, condensed matter physics, fluid dynamics, laser physics, mathematical physics, plasma physics·, quantum field theory, nano physics and quantum information theory.

== Collaboration with CERN ==
NCP is collaborating with CERN in the field of experimental high-energy physics and theoretical high-energy physics.

=== International Centre for Theoretical Physics (ICTP) ===
NCP signed a memorandum of understanding during dr. K. R. Sreenivasan, Director ICTP's visit to Pakistan from 26 to 30 June 2005. In addition, the Centre carries out research in areas that are not covered by any institute of Physics. One such area being pursued by the Centre involves a number of activities in Experimental High-Energy Physics through a co-operative agreement with CERN in Geneva, Switzerland. Besides this, NCP has collaborations with several international institutes and universities in the field of theoretical physics including AS-ICTP, Trieste, Italy; Centre for Plasma Astrophysics (CPA), K-Leuven University, Belgium; Tokyo University, Tokyo, Japan; Ruhr University, Bochum (RUB), Germany and many others. Several research papers are published in reputed international journals each year from NCP through national and international collaborations.

== Global co-operation ==
RNCP and the Other independent countries have signed formal Memorandum of Understanding agreements are below:

- Italy
- United Kingdom
- United States
- European Union
- China
- Japan
- Belgium
- Germany
- Sweden
- Norway
- France
- Switzerland
- India
- (Europe) European Commission
- UNESCO

== See also ==
- Riazuddin (physicist)
- Munir Ahmad Khan
- Ishfaq Ahmad
- Pervez Hoodbhoy
- Pakistan Atomic Energy Commission (PAEC)
- European Organization for Nuclear Research
- International Centre for Theoretical Physics

== Notes ==
Notes
