= Asghar Qadir =

Pakistani academic (born 1946)

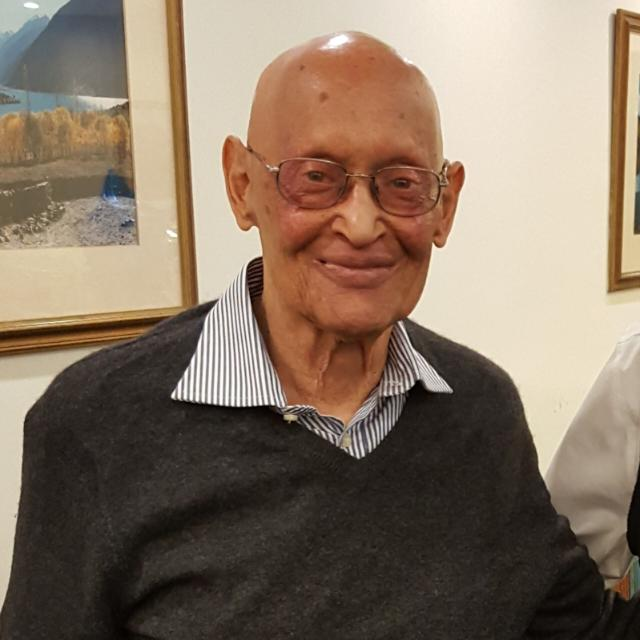
- Qadir in 2023
- Born: 23 July 1946 (age 80); Shimla, British Indian Empire (present-day Himachal Pradesh, India)
- Citizenship: Pakistan
- Education: University of London; Imperial College London
- Known for: His work on the mathematical sciences, relativity, economics, cosmology
- Awards: Hilal-i-Imtiaz (2008); Sitara-i-Imtiaz (1999); Pakistan Academy of Sciences Gold Medal in 1996; Fulbright Award (1979)
- Scientific career
- Fields: Mathematics
- Workplaces: National University of Sciences and Technology (NUST); Quaid-i-Azam University (QAU); International Centre for Theoretical Physics (ICTP); King Fahd University of Petroleum and Minerals (KFUPM); Rutherford Appleton Laboratory (RAL); University of Texas at Austin (UT)
- Doctoral advisor: Roger Penrose
- Other academic advisors: John Archibald Wheeler

Asghar Qadir, HI, SI, FPAS (Urdu: اصغر قادر born 23 July 1946) is a Pakistani mathematician, physicist and economist. In mathematics he contributed to the fields of differential equations, number theory and special functions. In physics his major contributions are to general relativity, astrophysics, cosmology, quantum field theory, and related fields. In economics he worked on critiquing the usual approach to Islamic economics, and introduced the ideas of dual sector inflation and quantum economics. He was an educationist: as a university teacher and administrator; and planning for the development of his fields of work in Pakistan, and to some extent in other parts of the Third World.

== Early life and education ==
His father, Manzur Qadir s/o Sir Abdul Qadir and mother, Asghari d/o Fazl-i-Hussain, married in 1936 and had a daughter, Shirin, in 1939 and a son, Basharat, in 1944. The son had a congenital disease, anidrotic ectodermal dysplasia, because of which he does not sweat, so his mother had gone to Simla in the summer of 1946, where Asghar was born with the same congenital defect. Their mother opened a nursery school in 1949 at her house, for them to study without exposure to excessive heat. Asghar studied at Cathedral School from 1953 to 1958, and then accompanied his parents to Karachi, where his father had to go as Foreign Minister. The family had to shift to Rawalpindi with the government, and Asghar took the matriculation examination privately, but attending classes at St. Mary's School in 1960. He joined Gordon College, Rawalpindi for the F.Sc., which he obtained in 1962. As his father then became Chief Justice of the Lahore High Court, they shifted to Lahore, where Asghar joined Government College, Lahore to obtain a B.Sc. in 1964, in Mathematics and Physics. He went to the Imperial College of Science and Technology, of the London University, for a B.Sc. (Hons.) in Physics, obtained in 1967 (along with an ARCS) and then a DIC in Theoretical Physics in 1968 from Imperial. He joined Roger Penrose for the PhD in General Relativity at the Mathematics Department of Birkbeck College, London University, which he was awarded on the 1st of February 1971. He married Rabiya d/o Mr. A.A. Mirza in 1972 and had two sons, Ali and Usman in 1973 and 1974, respectively.

== Career ==
Asghar Qadir joined the Mathematics Department of the Islamabad University, later called the Quaid-e-Azam University (QAU), in September 1971 as a Research Associate and continued at that University till 2004, with periods of Sabbatical and Extraordinary Leave, becoming Assistant Professor in 1973, Associate Professor in 1982, full Professor in 1987 and Meritorious Professor in 2000. He served as Chairman of the Department for over ten years, and Dean of the Faculty of Natural Sciences for over a year. He expressed his objections to various actions of the Vice Chancellor at QAU and resigned in protest in 2003. His resignation was converted to early retirement by the Syndicate of the University and accepted in 2004. He then joined the National University of Sciences & Technology (NUST), Islamabad and set up the Centre for Advanced Mathematics and Physics. He continued as its Director General till it was enlarged and converted to the School of Natural Sciences in late 2009 and then served as Principal of the School till the middle of 2011. He was then appointed Professor Emeritus for over seven years till January 2019 in the Physics Department. He was then appointed Advisor till June 2019, after which he left NUST.

== Association with other institutions ==
During the summers of 1966 and 1967 Asghar Qadir worked in the Beams Group of the proton synchrotron, NIMROD, at the Rutherford High Energy Laboratory (now called the Rutherford Appleton Laboratory), where he developed a Fortran IV Library subroutine for interpolation. This was needed to increase the efficiency of NIMROD from the low value of 7% to the design efficiency of 25%.

He went on Sabbatical Leave to work with John Archibald Wheeler at the Centre for Theoretical Physics of the University of Texas at Austin on a Fulbright Fellowship in 1978/79 and a Fulbright Hayes Fellowship in 1986/87. He attended summer courses in Mathematics at the International Centre for Theoretical Physics (ICTP) in 1972, 1975 and 1978 and attended the first Marcel Grossmann Meeting in 1972 and a Conference on Mathematical Economics there in 1978, In 1980 he was appointed Associate Member of the ICTP for six years in 1980, extended for another term till 1992, when he was made Senior Associate till 1999. During the terms funds are provided to the members but they retain the title without additional funds for life. He continued to visit the ICTP many times apart from those visits. He was appointed Research Associate at the Pakistan Institute of Development Economics (PIDE) in an honorary capacity from 1980 and then appointed Senior Fellow there in 1988. Also in 1980 he was appointed as Associate Director for Physics, Mathematics and Economics at the Centre of Basic Sciences (COBS) of the University Grants Commission of Pakistan in an honorary capacity which was converted to Director in 1988.

He went for one semester to the Ghulam Ishaq Khan Institute of Engineering Sciences and Technology (GIKI), during the Fall of 1993, as Professor of Mathematics to set up the Mathematics programme there, apart from helping with setting up the scheduling structure and the Faculty of Mathematics and Applied Physics. He then completed his permitted three years of Extraordinary Leave from 1994 to 1997 to go as Professor of Mathematics of the King Fahd University of Petroleum and Minerals (KFUPM), Dhahran, Saudi Arabia. When the rules of his University were changed to allow a total of five years, he went to KFUPM for two more years of leave from 2000 to 2002. After that he accepted an honorary appointment as Adjunct Professor there, on which he had to go for three to six weeks to KFUPM per year. He resigned from this position in 2015. He had many short visits to the Department of Physics of the La Sapienza University of Rome, Italy, starting in 1978. He also had many summer vacation visits to the Physics Department of the Salento University of Lecce, Italy, starting from 1995, and developed a collaboration between it and NUST. He visited the Centre of the Department of Computation and Applied Mathematics, Centre for Differential Equations, Continuum Mechanics and Applications (DECMA) of the University of the Witwatersrand, Johannesburg first in 1999 and then very frequently, and was given an honorary appointment as Visiting Professor at the Department. He developed a collaboration between DECMA and NUST as well.

After leaving NUST he took appointments as Visiting Professor for a semester or two at the Physics Department of GIKI, at the Abdus Salam School of Mathematics of the Government College University, Lahore, the Physics Department of the COMSATS University Islamabad, Islamabad, and the Mathematics Department of QAU.

== Development of Science in Pakistan ==
As part of COBS, Asghar Qadir visited all nine public sector universities of the time, to see what could be done to improve the standard of the subjects he was charged with. Some funds were provided for this purpose. He was also required to rank the departments for each subject in all the universities. He proposed that for Physics and Mathematics an M.Phil. (Sandwich) programme of four years for in-service teachers be run during the summer vacations, and that PIDE be given degree giving status and asked to run an M.Phil. programme to generate adequate human resources in Economics. Further, that faculty from the weaker departments should be funded to visit the top departments in each field, with the funding managed as the ICTP Associate programme did. Despite excellent feedback on the programme for Mathematics and good feedback for Physics, the programmed was discontinued. Various bureaucratic hurdles delayed the approval of the degree-giving status to PIDE for nearly a quarter of a century and it was not used as he had proposed for in-service training of faculty at the weaker universities.

He was also tasked with listing the errors in the School and College level textbooks and recommending how the situation could be improved. There were too many errors to list and he gave a list of the types of errors and tried to get them removed. However, only some errors were removed and many more introduced, so he recommended that foreign textbooks be used. This attempt was partially successful. In 1986, at the request of the Education Department of the Azad Jammu and Kashmir (AJK) Government, with a hand-picked tam he ran an extremely successful Refresher course for teachers of F.Sc. classes in Mathematics, that concentrated on dealing with the textbook problems faced by the teachers. He replicated the Refresher course at the behest of the UGC for the teachers of B.Sc. Mathematics in Pakistan in 1988. He recommended that the graduates of the M. Phil. Sandwich programme of Mathematics, with help from participants of the refresher courses, be used to replicate such refresher courses around the whole country and AJK, but this was not done as the Sandwich programme was discontinued. On noting that Pakistan was lagging behind in Science and Technology (S&T) the Ministry had tried sending selected students for training in these area. However, they performed badly because of lack of an adequate educational base. For this purpose COBS set up S&T training programmes for the candidates who would be sent abroad to select and first train them in Pakistan. Asghar Qadir was one of the major resource persons for these courses.

He was asked to participate in various sub-committees of the Planning Commission for different five year plans, for education, higher education, S&T, and for human resource development. In particular, he was asked to work on the sub-committee for “scientific manpower for the year 2000+, from which he withdrew after attending it for some on the grounds that the Committee lacked clarity of what was needed. He was asked to provide a “vision statement” for the Pakistan Council of Science and Technology for development of highly qualified scientific human resources, which was provided. He was put in various Think Tanks, including one for shifting from the two year B.Sc. and two year M.Sc. to the four year BS, which took time to be completed. He was put in charge of a Task Force for developing Mathematics in Pakistan which proposed a National Centre for Mathematics on the lines of the ICTP, which was adopted, but was totally unsuccessful.

== Development of Science in the Third World ==
In 1975 Salam proposed to his first PhD student, Riazuddin, to hold a Summer School in Pakistan. He decided to hold it in a hill station, Nathiagali. It was called the “International Nathiagali Summer College on Physics and Contemporary Needs” for acceptability in Pakistan. The idea was to get the leading scientists of the World to give series of lectures on various topics so that Third World scientists (including Pakistanis) who had gone idle due to isolation could get back to research, either in their original fields or in some other field that caught their fancy. There were three sections: Physics and Technology; Physics, Energy and Natural Resources; and Physics and the Frontiers of Knowledge. As Asghar Qadir had a house there, he was coopted in the organizing committee and became an active member of the team, running the seminar series on the Frontiers of Physics. The Colleges was held in the summer of 1976 and regarded as so successful that it was agreed that the series be continued. He continued to be active for the first few years and then reduced that activity.

In the summer of 1980 Salam asked his second PhD student, Fayyazuddin, to develop a proposal for a Prize for young Pakistani scientists to be funded from the proceeds of his Nobel Prize. Fayyaz consulted Asghar and they presented a proposal for the Prize to be managed by a Committee consisting of Riaz, Fayyaz and Asghar. It was to be awarded annually for Physics, Chemistry, Mathematics and Biology, by rotation, and awarded for an essay written for the Prize or for collected work. As Riaz and Fayyaz left Pakistan later in 1980, Asghar adopted the title of Secretary of the Salam Prize Committee and ran it for many years, finally getting funding from the Third World Academy of Sciences and handing it over to the Pakistan academy of Sciences. This Prize was taken as a model and run by other Third World countries, mainly in South America.

The Pakistani participants for the ICTP courses were generally sub-par, because they were generally nominees of the Education Ministry or of some University or College to get “a trip abroad” and not on the basis of capability or interest. As an Associate Member of the ICTP and an Associate Director of COBS, Asghar was asked to select them. Candidates would apply through COBS to go there. This procedure was successful and continued till COBS was disbanded. Asghar was coopted in the ICTP Summer School on Fundamental Physics for Bangladesh, China, Singapore, India and Pakistan (BCSPIN) that was held in Nepal, to go with the Pakistani team and help the younger participants with the topics covered. He noted that India was very well prepared for it, China had only a problem of understanding English, Pakistan was much weaker in the Physics background, Bangladesh much weaker, Nepal extremely weak and Singapore uninterested. He proposed that locally arranged Preparatory Schools be held: in China for English; in Pakistan and Bangladesh for Physics; and in Nepal and (if it were interested) Singapore, with the help of India. The Preparatory Schools proved very successful and finally replaced the main Schools. (There was a move to revive by one of the main organizers to revive the Schools, but it never took off.) The Office of External Activities of ICTP asked him to organize a Network in some field. He started a Network for Bangladesh, India, Pakistan, Turkey and Uzbekistan (BIPTUN) for Astrophysics, Cosmology and Relativity. This was very successful, but it later got limited to Uzbek students going to India and PhD funding for Uzbek students and was then discontinued. He was also asked to assist the Office for approving proposals for activities outside Italy. The discoverer of the first black hole, Remo Ruffini, held the Marcel Grossmann Meeting in Relativistic Astrophysics at the ICTP in the summer of 1975 and a second one in 1979. He shifted the venue to Shanghai, China for the third in 1982 and Rome for the fourth in 1985. The series then maintained a three year gap. He decided to set up a Centre for Relativistic Astrophysics, which would conduct research at its forefront and at which would largely have members at it from the Third World and organize the Grossmann Meetings, first at the La Sapienza University of Rome and in 1982, and then as the International Centre for Relativistic Astrophysics Network (ICRANet) in Pescara, Italy in 1986. He involved Asghar in it. For the fifth Meeting in Perth, Australia in 1988 he appointed Asghar as Chair of the International Coordinating Committee and Chair of a session in it. After that Asghar was generally a member of the organizing committee and of ICRANet, but without any portfolio. He made an unsuccessful attempt to make Pakistan a member of the Network with an office for the Director ICRANET at various Science Institutes.

A Conference on Mathematical Physics had been held in Adana, Turkey under the aegis of the ICTP, which had participants from Iran and Faheem Hussain from Pakistan. A few years later a follow-up Conference was held with the same group in Isfahan, Iran. There it was agreed that Faheem would organize the third one in Pakistan. He got Asghar to join him and formally started the Regional Conferences in Mathematical Physics with the Third one held in Islamabad, Pakistan in 1989, whose Proceedings were published by World Scientific and the series held the Conferences by rotation. It led to many careers in Physics being launched in these countries due to the Conferences. Due to the international political problems of Iran with the USA, the later internal problems in Iran, and the unavailability of the originators due to their demise or migration, the series kept stopping after the tenth, and it took Asghar’s repeated efforts to keep the series running till the 14th in 2015, after which it seems to have come to a halt. Asghar was one of the initiators of the series of conferences on Symmetries, Differential Equations and Applications that were organized between by South Africa, Pakistan and Turkey and the series of the Italian Pakistani Conferences on Relativistic Astrophysics, all of which produced internationally published Proceedings.

== Hobbies ==
Asghar played table tennis for the Rawalpindi Juniors Team in 1981 and was number two for them at the time. He played Chess and was Local Master level in it, playing for the second team of Imperial College in 1966 and 67, and in Bridge was Life-Master level, leading the Intervarsity Club in the London League in 1969 and 70. He reached 5th Junior Dan in Go in 1969 in London. He played the Spanish guitar and sang folk songs for an audience at the ICTP in Trieste. He writes poetry in Urdu and English and has had it published in various local magazines and newspapers and one (in English) on the internet for a long duration. He also published a number of popular articles on various topics and wrote one published internationally on popular science and science fiction. From 1960 to 1962 he made solid fuel rockets, designing the rockets and getting them made at a workshop and making the fuel himself. A rocket that he made was reported in the Pakistan Times as reaching an altitude of about 1,000 ft. He started a Rocketry Society at Government College, Lahore in 1963/64.

== Awards and honours ==
- Hilal-i-Imtiaz, Government of Pakistan (2008)
- (First) Distinguished National Professor, HEC Pakistan (2004) (for life)
- ISESCO Award for Mathematics (2003)
- Sitara-i-Imtiaz, Government of Pakistan (1999)
- Gold Medal, Pakistan Academy of Sciences (1996)
- Al Khwarizmi First Prize for Mathematics, by Government of Iran (1995)
- Prize, National Book Council of Pakistan, (1991)
- Senior Fulbright Fellowship, University of Texas at Austin, Texas, USA, (1986–87)
- Fulbright Hayes Award (1978–79)
- First prize in General Knowledge Contest for High School Students (1961);

== Fellowships and memberships ==
- Senior research fellow at Pakistan Institute of Development Economics (PIDE), from 1980 to 1994
- Joint secretary at Al-Kindi Society for the Advancement of the Philosophy of Science, Islamabad, Pakistan, (1980)
- Associate member and senior associate of the International Centre for Theoretical Physics, Trieste, Italy, 1980–1999
- Life member and vice-president, Albert Einstein Society (Pakistan Chapter) (1985 to date)
- Life member, joint secretary and secretary, Pakistan Physical Society. (1992 and 1993)
- Life member and president, Fulbright Alumni Association, (1992–1993)

== Publications ==
His recent newspaper articles include:

- Two Beacons of light (2017)
- Why the compulsory study of Islamiyat and Pakistan Studies is dividing us (2016)
- Don't take too much notice of university rankings, they're flawed (2016)
- Did Malala deserve the Nobel Peace Prize? (2014)
- Remembering Uncle Khushwant (2014)

His academic books include:

- Topology for Beginners (with Noor Muhammad and Imran Parvez Khan) (2022)
- Einstein's General Theory of Relativity (2020)
- Relativity: An Introduction to the Special Theory (1989)

His other publications include

- Popular Science: Fictional and Non-Fictional Dimensions
- Riazuddin: In Memoriam (2014)
- International Symposium on Experimental Gravitation (1994) by Munawar Karim and Asghar Qadir
- 5th International Summer College on Physics and Contemporary Needs (1990)
- 12th Regional Conference On Mathematical Physics (2008) by Aslam, M Jamil, Hussain, Faheem, Qadir, Asghar
- Gravitational Wave Sources May Be "Further" Than We Think by Asghar Qadir
- On Quantum Effects Near a Black Hole Singularity (2008) by Asghar Qadir, Asghar, Azad A. Siddiqui
- Mathematical physics: proceedings of the 12th Regional Conference by Riazuddin, Asghar Qadir, Faheem Hussain, Hamid Saleem, M. Jamil Aslam.

== See also ==
- Roger Penrose
- Riazuddin
- Oliver Penrose
- Partial Differential Equation
- University of Islamabad
- National University of Sciences and Technology
- Muhammad Sharif
- Ismat Beg
