= Fayyazuddin =

Pakistani emeritus professor of theoretical physics (born 1930)

- Born: 10 November 1930 (age 95); Ludhiana, Punjab Province, British India
- Citizenship: Pakistan
- Education: University of Punjab; Imperial College, London
- Known for: Research in Gauge Theories, Chiral symmetry, Heavy Quark Spin Symmetry, Phenomenology of Particle Interactions
- Awards: Hilal-i-Imtiaz
- Scientific career
- Fields: Theoretical Physics
- Workplaces: National Center for Physics (NCP); Quaid-i-Azam University (QAU); Pakistan Atomic Energy Commission (PAEC); King Abdul Aziz University (KAAU); Ummal Qura University (UQU); King Saud University (KSU); European Organization for Nuclear Research (CERN); Rutherford Appleton Laboratory (RAL); Enrico Fermi Institute for Nuclear Studies (EFINC); University of Chicago (UC)
- Doctoral advisor: Abdus Salam
- Other academic advisors: Rafi Muhammad Chaudhry

Notes
- Twin brother of the theoretical physicist Riazuddin and father of the theoretical physicist Ansar Fayyazuddin (physicist).

Fayyazuddin (Note: Punjabi/Urdu: فياض الدين) (born 10 November 1930) is a Pakistani theoretical physicist and emeritus professor, specialising in theoretical physics and mathematical physics at the National Centre for Physics of Quaid-e-Azam University in Islamabad. He conducted research in the fields of quantum mechanics, particle physics, and meson physics. Fayyazuddin has published numerous papers alongside Riazuddin, including a renowned one on Quantum Mechanics.

== Biography ==
Fayyazuddin is the twin brother of physicist Riazuddin, and a student of Abdus Salam.

=== Education ===
He and his twin brother Riazuddin were born on 10 November 1930 into a Punjabi family in Ludhiana where they received their intermediate education. Following the partition of India, the family migrated to Lahore, Pakistan. The two attended Punjab University. Fayyazuddin completed his Bachelor of Arts with honors in mathematics from Punjab University and subsequently earned Master of Science in mathematical physics under the fellowship of Abdus Salam in 1953. His master's degree dissertation Methods of Mathematical Physics was co-written by Riazuddin. In 1953, he became a Master of Philosophy in particle physics with the academic thesis Energy Loss of Mesons in Crystals under the fellowship of Rafi Muhammad Chaudhry from the same university.

After teaching mathematics and physics at Karachi University, Fayyaz traveled to the United Kingdom in 1959. He attended Imperial College London where Abdus Salam and Riazuddin served as his teachers. He was awarded a PhD in theoretical particle physics under the fellowship of Abdus Salam in 1962. Fayyaz's dissertation was written on the "Preliminary Analysis of Photoproduction of K Mesons in the Mandelstam Representation". Fayyaz then returned to Pakistan and served at the Pakistan Atomic Energy Commission (PAEC).

== Academic career ==
Fayyazuddin joined the PAEC in 1962 where he worked under the guidance of professor Abdus Salam and continued his research on the cosmic ray mu-mesons. He undertook postdoctoral research at the Enrico Fermi Institute at the University of Chicago from 1966 to 1968. At the institute, Fayyaz, Faheem Hussain, Riazuddin, and Peter Rotteli, formed "The Relativity Group", a team of young research scientists in special relativity. In 1968, when the Institute of Physics was established at the University of Islamabad (now Quaid-i-Azam University), the scientists eagerly returned to Pakistan. Fayyazuddin, Hussain, Arif-uz-Zaman, and Sarwar Razmi joined the Institute of Physics. The institute become an active center for theoretical particle physics research due to their distinguished contribution, and its presence was recognized internationally.

In 1970, he went to Great Britain, where he attended Rutherford Appleton Laboratories as an associate research scientist. In 1972, he returned to the Institute of Physics of Quaid-e-Azam University. He joined the Theoretical Physics Group under his brother's guidance and participated in Fast neutron calculations – a key calculation to develop the weapons. In 1973, Fayyaz traveled to Geneva, Switzerland where he became a visiting scientist at the European Organization for Nuclear Research (CERN). In 1977, he returned to Quaid-i-Azam University as a physics professor and subsequently became the dean of the Faculty of Natural Sciences. In 1980, he went to Saudi Arabia where he became a regular professor of physics at the King Saud University in Riyadh and a regular professor of physics at the Ummal Qura University in Mecca till 1996. After teaching in Saudi Arabia, he returned to Quaid-i-Azam University in 2005. In 2007, Fayyazuddin joined Pakistan's National Center for Physics as a senior scientist. In 2008, he was awarded HEC Distinguished Professor award by the Higher Education Commission of Pakistan. In 2000, the President of Pakistan, General Pervez Musharraf, conferred on him Pakistan's second-highest civilian award Hilal-i-Imtiaz for his contributions to the field of research in physics and science.

== Awards and honors ==
- Hilal-i-Imtiaz (Crescent of Excellence) Award by the Government of Pakistan - (2000)
- HEC Distinguished Professor Award - (2007)
- Khawarzmi International Award in Physics - (2003)
- Gold Medal - Pakistan Academy of Sciences (1979)
- D. Dwyer Bhawani Dass Gold Medal, Government College University - (1951)

== Fellowships and memberships ==
- A fellow of the Third World Academy of Sciences for the Developing World (TWAS)
- A research member, National Center for Physics, Quaid-i-Azam University, Islamabad (1999)
- An Associate Member at the International Center for Theoretical Physics, Trieste, Italy (1966–1969, 1972–1980, 1983–1993)
- An honorary Member of American Physical Society (1977)
- A Life Member of Pakistan Physical Society (1999)
- A Member, Syndicate, Quaid-i-Azam University (1975–1977)

== Works ==
=== Research papers ===
- Development of Science and its Impact on Society
- First LHC School, National Center for Physics (2009)
- The Kawarabayashi-Suzuki-Riazuddin-Fayyazuddin relation and strong mesonic couplings in the cloudy bag model.
- Riazuddin, A.Q.; Sarker, Fayyazuddin (1 August 1968). "Current algebra, spectral function sum rules and the f − (0) / ƒ+(0) ratio in Kℓ3 decay". Nuclear Physics B. 6 (5): 515–522. Bibcode:1968NuPhB...6..515R. doi:10.1016/0550-3213(68)90297-6.
- Fayyazuddin, Riazuddin (4 July 1974). "The ΔI = 1/2 rule in non-leptonic weak decays" (PDF). Nuclear Physics B. 76 (1): 125–136. Bibcode:1974NuPhB..76..125F. doi:10.1016/0550-3213(74)90142-4.
- Radioactive D* decay using vector meson dominance by Riazuddin and Fayyazuddin

=== Conference papers ===
- Current Algebra and Its Consequences by Fayyazuddin. Papers presented in Center for Advanced Mathematics and Physics (CAMP), National University of Sciences and Technology

=== Books ===
- Quantum Mechanics by Fayyazuddin and Riazuddin, World Scientific, Singapore, (1990)
- Fayyazuddin; Riazuddin (2011). A Modern Introduction to Particle Physics. World Scientific Publishing. ISBN 9789814338851.
- Selected Papers of Abdus Salam, with Commentary by A. Ali, Abdus Salam, Fayyazuddin, Riazuddin

== See also ==
- Riazuddin
- Abdus Salam
