= Ishfaq Ahmad Khan =

Pakistani nuclear physicist (1930–2018)

Ishfaq Ahmad
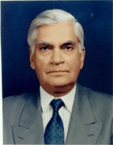
- Ishfaq Ahmad (1930–2018) c. 1990s
- Born: 3 November 1930; Gurdaspur, Gurdaspur district, Punjab, British India (Present-day, Gurdaspur, Punjab, India)
- Died: 18 January 2018 (aged 87); Islamabad, Pakistan
- Education: Université de Montréal; University of Punjab
- Known for: Nuclear Deterrence; Contribution to Pion and particle physics; Stellar nucleosynthesis
- Awards: Nishan-i-Imitiaz (1998); Hilal-i-Imtiaz (1995); Sitara-i-Imtiaz (1989)
- Scientific career
- Fields: Nuclear physics
- Workplaces: Pakistan Atomic Energy Commission; Institute of Nuclear Science and Technology; International Atomic Energy Agency; Government College University; National Centre for Physics; Planning Commission
- Thesis: Structure et identification des trajectoires dans les emulsions ionographiques à grain fin (1959)
- Doctoral advisor: Pierre Demers
- Other academic advisors: R.M. Chaudhry
- Notable students: Samar Mubarakmand

Ishfaq Ahmad (3 November 1930 – 18 January 2018) SI, HI, NI, FPAS, was a Pakistani nuclear physicist, emeritus professor of high-energy physics at the National Centre for Physics, and former science advisor to the Government of Pakistan.

A versatile theoretical physicist, Ahmad made significant contributions in the theoretical development of the applications and concepts involving the particle physics, and its relative extension to the quantum electrodynamics, while working as senior research scientist at the CERN in the 1960s and 1970s. Joining the PAEC in the late 1950s, Ahmad served as the director of the Nuclear Physics Division at the secret Pinstech Institute which developed the first designs of atomic bombs, a clandestine project during the post-1971 war. There, he played an influential role in leading the physics and mathematical calculations in the critical mass of the weapons, and did theoretical work on the implosion method used in the weapons.

Since the 1960s and onwards, he was a high-ranking official at the IAEA as part of the Pakistan Government's official mission, working to make the peaceful use of nuclear power for the industrial development. Having chaired the PAEC from 1991 until 2001, he was affiliated with the Pakistan Government as a science adviser to the prime minister on strategic and scientific programs, with the status of Minister of State. A vehement supporter for the peaceful use of nuclear energy, he earned public and international fame in May 1998 when he oversaw and directed PAEC to perform country's first public atomic tests (see Chagai-I and Chagai-II) in a secret weapon-testing laboratories in Balochistan Province of Pakistan. He died on 18 January 2018, aged 87 in Lahore.

== Biography ==
=== Early life and education ===
Ahmad was born in Gurdaspur, Punjab in India on 3 November 1930 into a Kakazai family that had long been settled in Punjab. Ahmad obtained his early education in Jalandhar, later schooling in Lyallpur, and Lahore before enrolling in the Punjab University in Lahore to study Physics, and earned his undergraduate, BSc degree, in Physics in 1949.

After entering in the post graduate school at the Punjab University, Ahmad obtained his MSc degree, in 1951, after submitting his master's thesis on nuclear physics, which was supervised by R. M. Chaudhry. With his master's degree, he obtained Honours diploma and secured a gold medallion for the recognition of his work in physics. He taught various undergraduate physics laboratory courses at the Government College University while working on fundamental concepts in nuclear physics with his university mentor. In 1954, he won the scholarship under the Colombo Plan fellowship program and went to Quebec, Canada for his doctorate studies.

Ahmad attended the doctorate school at the Université de Montréal and did a two-year-long course in Particle physics and engaged his research on theoretical physics. In 1959, Ahmad obtained D.Sc. in physics after submitting his doctoral works on concepts on advancing on particle physics. His theses were written in fluent French and English language, and he reluctantly returned to Pakistan under the terms of Colombo Plan contract. His DSc theses were supervised by Pierre Demers and covered a wide range of research in the study of elementary particles by using the deployment of special fine grain nuclear emulsion (AgBr). During his long doctoral studies, Ahmad studied nuclear reaction at the Montreal Laboratory with supervisors and scientists role in the Manhattan Project. Upon his return to Pakistan, he joined the Pakistan Atomic Energy Commission (PAEC) as a senior scientist.

=== Academia and CERN ===
In 1952, Ahmad served as a visiting professor of mathematics at the Government College University, before accepting the professorship of mathematics at the University of Paris in 1959. He engaged his research in theoretical physics and obtained a one-year-long research fellowship at the Niels Bohr Institute for Theoretical Physics. In 1962–64, he accepted the professorship in physics at the University of Montreal and the University of Ottawa. In Ottawa, he carried out pioneering research in particle resonance and published important publications in theoretical physics.

Ahmad also performed experiments on nuclear physics at the Meuse Underground Laboratories of France. In 1965, Ahmad published a research report on absorption of Pion's cross sections and the range of complex atom's energy of the pion particle. He recalled his Cern experience in 1994:

In 1994, I visited CERN as chairman of PAEC. The visit took place on the initiative of Pakistani (theoretical) physicist Ahmed Ali, who works at DESY. It brought back good memories of my earlier visits, which date back to 1962 when I came to CERN as a young post-doctoral fellow working at the University Institute of Theoretical Physics in Copenhagen (now the Niels Bohr Institute) to perform a nuclear emulsion experiment. During my visit in 1994, I was fascinated to see the exciting developments in physics that were taking place at CERN, and I had only one wish— that my own country, Pakistan— should somehow become involved in scientific collaboration with CERN, and that our physicists and engineers could also become part of the most advanced, challenging and rewarding scientific endeavour: the Large Hadron Collider (LHC).

— Ishfaq Ahmad, 1994, source

In the 1990s, Ahmad played a pivotal role in building closer relations with the CERN, and lobbied tirelessly for PAEC to reach an agreement with CERN. In 1997, Ahmad, as chair of PAEC, signed an agreement with CERN in the up gradation of the CMS detector and the financial contribution worth one million SFr for the construction of eight magnetic rings for the detector. This was followed by in 1998, Ishfaq Ahmad, as PAEC chairman, reached another contract with CERN. The signing of the agreement was followed by the state visit of CERN's director Christopher Llewellyn Smith with whom Ahmad signed a collaborative agreement that provided an entry point for Pakistani's scientist (respectively PAEC) into the CMS collaboration.

In 2000, another treaty between PAEC and CERN was signed that covered the construction of the resistive plate chambers required for the CMS muon system. In Press Conference with Luciano Maiani, Ahmad quoted: "I very much hope and wish that these developments may eventually lead to Pakistan becoming an associate member of CERN."

== Pakistan Atomic Energy Commission ==
In 1960, Ahmad joined the Pakistan Atomic Energy Commission (PAEC) as senior scientist and was allowed to proceed abroad for post-doctoral work at several of the world's most renowned research institutions. Ahmad published papers in physics at the Niels Bohr Institute at Copenhagen; also at the University of Montreal in Canada as well as the University of Paris – Sorbonne in France. Finally, he settled down for work at the Lahore Centre of the PAEC (PAEC) in 1965. Ahmad held the post of Senior Scientific Officer until 1966. From 1969 until 1971, Ahmad was the director of the Atomic Energy Centre in Lahore; and then served as secretary of PAEC from 1967 till 1969. In 1971, Ahmad became director of the Institute of Nuclear Science and Technology in Nilore until 1976. In 1976, he became a Science Member of PAEC, raised to the position of Senior Member in 1988. He became Chairman of the Commission in 1991 and remained its chairman from 13 March 1991 to 19 December 2001.

While he was Chairman PAEC, Ahmad has been heading the country's delegation at the International Atomic Energy Agency (IAEA) in Vienna, Austria. At IAEA, he was always very keen for getting technical support and the breaking of the isololation of scientists from third world. On his persuasion IAEA's technical assistance program was adapted to cater for special needs of the developing countries. In this regard a Standing Advisory Group on Technical Assistance and Cooperation (SAGTAC) was established; Ahmad served as the first Chairman of the Group.

=== 1971 war and atomic bomb project ===
After the 1971 war with India, the government sent Ishfaq Ahmad to the Pakistan Institute of Nuclear Science and Technology (PINSTECH). When Munir Ahmad Khan became the chairman of PAEC and was put in charge of secret atomic bomb project, Munir Khan appointed Ahmad as the director of PINSTECH, where he remained up to 1976. Ahmad served as the director of the Nuclear Physics Division at the secret Pinstech Institute which developed the first designs of atomic bombs, a clandestine project during the post-1971 war. There, he played an influential role in leading the physics and mathematical calculations in the critical mass of the weapons, and did preliminary theoretical work on the implosion method used in the weapons.

In 1976, PAEC succeeded in producing the first local 10kg of Yellowcake and later on produced the ^{239}Pu, the weapon grade plutonium in 1983, which was later tested with the nuclear device.

At PINSTECH, Ahmad produced the first Photographic plate to identify the fissile matter in natural uranium when it is explored. However, due to its classified research, the knowledge of such detector is completely classified. The NPD developed the Thermoluminescent Dosimeter to measure the detection of alpha particles emitted in the decay of radon and thoron gases. Ahmad collaborating with Hameed Ahmad Khan —director of Radiation Physics Division – in the development of CR-39, a type of particle detector. Ahmad gained expertise in nuclear emulsion and developed a first classified nuclear emulsion that provided information about the mass, charge and velocity of the particles producing the track.

A first device was physically manufactured by 1983, and transported to Sargodha air force base for a first test. On 11 March 1983, a first cold test, codename Kirana-I, of a device was secretly carried out at the weapon-testing laboratories built inside the Central Ammunition Depot (CAD) of Sargodha AFB. The test was overseen and conducted by a small team of scientists led by Ahmad, while calculations on quantum oscillator was conducted by Theoretical physics group. Other invitees and attendees included the Munir Ahmad Khan, Samar Mubarakmand, and Masud Ahmad of PAEC whilst others were high-ranking civilians officials of elite civil bureaucracy and the active-duty officer of the Pakistan military.

=== Chagai tests ===
In 1991, Ahmad was officially approved as the chairman of PAEC by the prime minister of Pakistan after Munir Khan retired. During this time, he had been a senior scientist and acted as official science advisor to the government of Pakistan on many occasions. In 1998, Ahmad visited Canada to deliver lecture on quantum physics at the Montreal Laboratory when the news of surprise nuclear tests, codename Pokhran-II, of India reached to him. On 16 May 1998, Ahmad cut short his trip and returned to Pakistan to attend meeting with Prime minister Nawaz Sharif, and arranged his meeting with Prime minister on 17 May 1998. The message was bestowed to him by the Joint Headquarters at Rawalpindi, informing him to remain on stand-by a meeting with the Prime Minister. After commencing the meeting with the Prime minister, Ahmad received green signal from the government of Pakistan to conduct country's first test as a suitable reply to Indian nuclear aggression.

Ahmad personally supervised the test preparations as he also suggests the codenames of the tests. On 28 May 1998, the PAEC, sided by KRL and corps of engineers, performed the first nuclear tests, codename Chagai-I which was followed by Chagai-II two days later, in May 1998. Evidently, the fission devices were had contained the boosted-fission HEU nuclear process, that came from the KRL. But, on 30 May, the second test, codename Chagai-II, was performed completely under the command and control management of the PAEC. The fission devices, on a second test, were reportedly had contained the weapon grade plutonium, producing around at ~20kt of nuclear force. All together, the superposition of sum of the forces and the total blast yield was ranged at the nearly ~40kt of nuclear force, according to the PAEC scientific data.

== Later work and activism ==
=== Earthquake studies and climate change ===
After retiring from the PAEC in 2001, Ahmad developed interests in seismology and the climate change, and helped founded the Global Change Impact Studies Centre and the Centre for Earthquake Studies (CES), both initially attached to the National Centre for Physics (NCP) in Islamabad.

He also put Pakistan on the governing Council of the International Institute for Applied Systems Analysis (IIASA), Austria, which conducts policy related research using mathematical modeling and simulation tools.

=== Global Change Impact Studies Centre (GCISC) ===
Ishfaq Ahmad's efforts led to the creation of the Global Change Impact Studies Centre (GCISC). The centre, an autonomous organisation under the federal govt, works in collaboration with national institutions such as Pakistan Meteorological Department (PMD), National Agricultural Research Centre (NARC), WAPDA and PCRWR etc. The centre has also established collaborative relationship with international institutions, most importantly The Abdus Salam International Centre for Theoretical Physics (ICTP), Trieste, Italy.

=== Centre for Earthquake Studies (CES) ===
After 8 October 2005, Kashmir earthquake, the Government has decided to establish a Centre for Earthquake studies in Islamabad, under the technical direction of Ishfaq Ahmad. The centre under the directorship of Mr. Shahid Ashraf and Ahsan Mubarak started work in collaboration with world leading scientists such as Elchin Khalilov of Azerbaijan. The centre conducts research using a Gravitational Wave Recorder housed at the National Centre for Physics, Islamabad.

=== Advocacy for Nuclear power ===
Ishfaq Ahmad is internationally known for his long-standing public advocacy for the nuclear power plants for the industrial and socio-economic growth. On international forums, Ahmad deterred the international pressure mounted on Pakistan after conducting its tests, instead highlighted the achievements gained by Pakistan on its nuclear power infrastructure in the country as well as the need of Pakistan's usage of nuclear power for its economical growth. In 2012, Ahmad lobbied for the HMC-3 consortium to be listed as first commercial nuclear power corporation and helped the consortium to acquire its first license to manufacture nuclear materials for industrial power plants.

== State honours, awards and recognition ==
In 1989, Ishfaq Ahmad was bestowed with first state honour, Sitara-e-Imtiaz by Benazir Bhutto; and Hilal-e-Imtiaz in 1995. In 1998, Ahmad received the highest state honour, Nishan-e-Imtiaz, given to any national of Pakistan, for his services to the country in a graceful state ceremony. The same year, he was awarded gold medallion by the Institute of Leadership and Management in Lahore.

- Nishan-i-Imitiaz (1998)
- Hilal-i-Imtiaz (1995)
- Sitara-i-Imtiaz (1989)
- Gold Medal, Pakistan Academy of Sciences (1998)
- Gold Medal, Institute of Leadership & Management (ILM) (1998)
- Gold Medal, Society of Engineering, Materials and Metallurgical Engineering (SEMME), Karachi, (1998)
- Gold Medal, Geological Society of Punjab, (1998)
- Doctorate of Science Honoris Causa, UET Lahore, 2000.
- Who's who in atom, American Institute of Physics (1969)

== Fellowships ==
- Elected President of the Pakistan Academy of Sciences (2007)
- Board of Directors of the Abdus Salam Centre for Solid State Physics, Government College University, Lahore, 2006–present.
- Board of Governors of the Ghulam Ishaq Khan Institute of Engineering Sciences and Technology (GIKI) (2002)
- Chairman and Board of Governors, Riazuddin National Centre for Physics, Quaid-i-Azam University, Islamabad (2001)
- Fellow of the Islamic World Academy of Sciences (2000)
- Fellow of the Nuclear Society of Pakistan (1997)
- Elected fellow of the Pakistan Nuclear Society (1993)
- Honorary Fellow of the International Nuclear Energy Academy (INEA)
- Honorary Member of World Innovation Foundation (WIF), UK (2006)
- Board of Governors of the Government College University, Lahore (1989–1996)
- Fellow of the Pakistan Academy of Sciences (1983)
- Fellow at Niels Bohr Institute of Theoretical Physics, Copenhagen, Denmark (1961–1962)
- Member of the Board of Sponsors of The Bulletin of the Atomic Scientists.
- Member of the Board of Physics Olympiad of Pakistan.
- An honorary Council Member of International Institute for Applied Systems Analysis (IIASA).

== Publications ==
=== Thesis ===
D.Sc. Thesis (UQAM): Structure and Identification of trajectories in fine grain ionographic emulsions, under the direction of Pierre Demers, Faculty of Science, University of Montreal, Canada, 1958.

=== Research papers ===
- Trajectories structure in fine-grained emulsions, Ann. ACFAS, 23, 111–112, 1957. (http://er.uqam.ca/nobel/c3410/PierreDemersBibl1950-9.html)
- Structure des trajectoires dans les émulsions à grain fin, avec Ishfaq Ahmad, 1er Colloque International de Photographie Corpusculaire. Strasbourg, 1957
- Identification of particles in the fine grain emulsions with Ishfaq Ahmad and Jean-Louis Meunier, 1er Colloque International de Photographie Corpusculaire. Strasbourg, 1957
- Photometric analysis of the trajectories in ionographic detectors, 25th ACFAS, Univ. Laval, Quebec, Nov.3,1957.Ann.ACFAS,24, 119, 1958.
- An optical model of the granular structure of trajectories, 2nd Symposium photography corpuscular Montreal 1958. ACFAS, 26th Congress, University of Ottawa, 31 Oct.- 2 Nov. 1958.

6. L'INFLUENCE DU DÉVELOPPEMENT SUR LA STRUCTURE DES TRAJECTOIRES ET SUR LE VOILE DANS LES ÉMULSIONS À GRAINS FINS, Canadian Journal of Physics, 1959, 37(12). pp. 1548–1552. (http://www.nrcresearchpress.com/doi/pdf/10.1139/p59-171)

- The ionographic detector considered a pulse source, PC II, PUM, 314- 316, 1959.
- Influence du diamètre moyen des grains vierges dans une émulsion

nucléaire sur la structure des lacunes. Ahmad Ishfaq and Max Morand. Comptes rendus hebdomadaires des séances de l'Académie des sciences, France, 1959, Vol. 1–3 (T248, part 1), pp. 1798–1800 (http://gallica.bnf.fr/ark:/12148/bpt6k32002/f1836.image).

- Influence of the gelatin on the granular size distribution of silver bromide during the production of ionographic emulsions, PC III, PUM, 128–134, 1964. (http://er.uqam.ca/nobel/c3410/PierreDemersBibl1960-9.html)
- Ionographic emulsion made with a mixture of polyvinyl alcohol and albumin, ACFAS, 32nd Congress, Univ. Ottawa, Ontario, 6–8 Nov. 1964.

1964, Ann. ACFAS, 31, 76–7, 1965.

- Ionographic emulsions loaded with diamond powder, ACFAS, 32nd Congress, Univ. Ottawa, Ontario, 6 to 8 November,
- (3,3) Resonance in the Nucleus – Progress of Theoretical Physics, Journal of the Physical Society of Japan. Vol 35 (3), 1966 (http://ptp.oxfordjournals.org/content/35/3/566.full.pdf).

13. The role of pre-irradiation annealing in changing the track development characteristics of glass track detectors. Nuclear Instruments and Methods, Vol.131(1), 1975, pp. 89–92.

- 'Seasoning' of latent damage trails in lunar samples, Nature 254, 1975, pp 126–127.
- Anisotropy in the track development properties of various crystallographic planes of natural quartz crystals, Radiation Effects, Vol. 30(3), 1976, pp 159–165.
- The use of Alpha Sensitive Plastic Films (ASPF) for uranium/thorium exploration and prospecting. Radiation Physics and Chemistry, Vol. 11(6), 1978, pp 295–297.
- The measurement of radon and thoron by solid state nuclear track detectors, Radiation Effects, Vol. 35 (1–2), 1978, pp 35–43.
- Track structure and identification of particles in nuclear emulsions. Nuclear Instruments and Methods, Vol. 173(1), 1980, pp 15–20.
- Some important considerations in the use of solid state nuclear track detectors for radon gas concentration measurements. Nuclear Instruments and Methods, Volume 173 (1), 1980, pp 183–189.
- Field experience about the use of alpha sensitive plastic films for uranium exploration. Nuclear Instruments and Methods, Volume 173(1), 1980, Pages 191–196
- CERN and Pakistan: a personal perspective, 2003 (http://cerncourier.com/cws/article/cern/28934).
- Managing nuclear knowledge in a developing country: Pakistan's perspective. Int. J. Nuclear Knowledge Management. Vol 1(1–2), 2004, pp 90–97.
- MANAGING NUCLEAR KNOWLEDGE: ROLE OF IAEA AND ITS TECHNICAL COOPERATION PROGRAMME, International Conference on Nuclear Knowledge Management Strategies, Information Management and Human Resource Development, 7–10 September 2004, Sacley, France. (http://www.iaea.org/km/cnkm/presentations/ahmadpakistan.pdf)
- DEVELOPING COUNTRIES AND THE CHALLENGE OF CLIMATE CHANGE, International Conference on Environment: Survival and Sustainability.

19–24 February 2007, Cyprus (https://www.springer.com/environment/sustainable+development/book/978-3-540-95990-8).

=== Books ===
- Ahmad, Ishfaq D.Sc. (2002). Water and New Technologies (in English and French). Islamabad, Islamabad Capital Territory: Global Change Impact Studies Centre. p. 168. ISBN 978-969-8500-00-9.

== See also ==
- Munir Ahmad Khan
- Abdus Salam
- European Organization for Nuclear Research (CERN)
- International Atomic Energy Agency (IAEA)
- Montreal Laboratory

Government offices
Preceded by Javaid Laghari	Science Advisor to the Prime Minister Secretariat; 1996–2001	Succeeded by Abdul Qadeer Khan; Acting
Preceded by Atta ur Rahman	Science Advisor to the Prime Minister Secretariat; 30 March 2008 – 16 March 2013	Succeeded by Sania Nishtar
