= Muhammad Hafeez Qureshi =

Pakistani mechanical engineer (1930–2007)

- Born: 31 October 1930; Kapurthala, Punjab, India (Present day, Kapurthala, Punjab in India)
- Died: 11 August 2007 (aged 76); Wah, Punjab in Pakistan
- Citizenship: Pakistan
- Education: Karachi University; Michigan State University
- Known for: Pakistan and weapons of mass destruction
- Awards: Sitara-e-Imtiaz (1992); Hilal-i-Imtiaz (2000); Nishan-e-Imtiaz (2024)
- Scientific career
- Fields: Mechanical engineering
- Workplaces: Pakistan Atomic Energy Commission; Pakistan Institute of Nuclear Science and Technology; Metallurgical Laboratory
- Academic advisors: Michael David Burton

Muhammad Hafeez Qureshi (Urdu: محمد حفيظ قريشى) (31 October 1930 – 11 August 2007), NI, SI, HI, known as Hafeez Qureshi, was a Pakistani nuclear scientist and a mechanical engineer, known for his role as a diagnostics engineer for his nation's nuclear capability.

His career was spent working at the Pakistan Institute of Nuclear Science & Technology as overseeing the diagnostics on the subcritical experiments on the nuclear weapons where he gained expertise in engineering applications of nuclear physics.

== Biography ==
=== Early life and education ===
Muhammad Hafeez Qureshi was born in Kapurthala, in Punjab, British India, to a Punjabi-speaking Muslim family on 31 October 1930. His family emigrated from India to Pakistan sometime after the partition of India in 1947; they settled in Karachi, Sindh. Upon matriculating from a local high school, Qureshi enrolled at Karachi University in 1956; he partly supported his studies by working as a motor mechanic.

In his dormitory at the university, his schoolmate and friend was notable future optical physicist Dr. Muhammad Jameel— who was also present when Pakistan tested its nuclear devices in Ras Koh Range. He attained a Bachelor of Science (BSc) in physics and earned a scholarship to resume his studies at Michigan State University (MSU) in the United States.

At MSU, Qureshi enrolled in the engineering department and gained a Bachelor of Science (BS) in mechanical engineering, followed by a Master of Science (MS), also in mechanical engineering His mechanical engineering thesis contained work on applications of the mechanics of materials. In 1960, he was admitted into the doctoral program in mechanical engineering at MSU, but left his doctoral studies for unknown reasons.

After returning to Pakistan in 1960, Qureshi joined Karachi Mechanical Laboratories (KML) and found employment with the Pakistan Atomic Energy Commission (PAEC) in 1963, where he joined the staff led by Dr. Naeem Ahmad Khan in Lahore.

== Pakistan Atomic Energy Commission ==
In 1963, Qureshi served as design engineer at the Atomic Energy Center in Lahore where he oversaw the installation of the first neutron generator. In 1965, Qureshi moved to Nilore to join Pakistan Institute of Nuclear Science and Technology (PINSTECH) where he was part of the team that designed his nation's first nation's nuclear pile —PARR-I reactor at Pinstech Laboratory in Nilore which went critical in 1965. In 1967, Qureshi moved to the Nuclear Physics Group working under Naeem Ahmad Khan that was investigating on the feasibility of the gas centrifuges for the industrial enrichment.

This study group also included Sultan Mahmood and Samar Mubarakmand but left the project when he joined the Radiation Isotope Application Division (RIAD) at the laboratory under Naeem Ahmad Khan. In December 1971, Qureshi was made director of RIAD with support provided from Dr. Naeem Ahmad.

=== 1971 war and atomic bomb project ===
In 1974, Qureshi was invited by Munir Ahmad Khan and Abdus Salam to participate in the development of nuclear weapons when he was asked to design, engineer, and machine the design components, tampers, and explosive lenses necessary for detonation of the nuclear weapon. He soon joined the Metallurgical Laboratory (ML) located in Wah Cantonment and collaborated with Dr. Zaman Sheikh, a physical chemist and authority on explosives, of Defence Science & Technology Organization (DESTO). This led to the establishment of the Wah Group Scientist (WGS) at the ML that worked on metallurgical aspect of the nuclear device. Several sessions were held on the feasibility of the device between the Wah Group Scientist with the Abdus Salam and Riazuddin of Theoretical Physics Group (TPG); Asghar Qadir and Munir Ahmad Rashid of the Mathematical Physics Group; Ishfaq Ahmad of Nuclear Physics Division. During the meeting, the word bomb was never used, instead the scientists used scientific research rationale. There, the scientists decided to develop an 'implosion' over the 'gun' type fission device citing economy in the use of fissile material.

The Wah Group Scientists also took initiatives in designing of high precision mechanical and chemical components – how tampers would be developed to produce efficiency and high precision data – physics calculations – what would its appropriate time reaction be when the explosives make contact with the material– high explosives– what kind of chemistry be would be used, and triggering mechanisms – how the weapon would be detonated. Since the testing facilities in PINSTECH Nilore lacked, the ML performed several explosives experiments and chemistry measurements in cooperation with the Pakistan Ordnance Factories (POF), which was the source of providing the explosives, in 1976.

By 1979, the Wah Group Scientists under Hafeez and Sheikh had developed the wide range of explosive lenses, design components finished on the computer numerical control, the polymer-based high explosive materials, and triggering mechanisms.

=== Subcritical testing and diagnostics ===
In 1980, the Wah Group Scientist team collaborated with the Diagnostics Directorate in designing the diagnostics to viability and reliability of the first nuclear device without the use of nuclear testing. The subcritical experiments on the physical package was organized in the secret Kirana Hills Site, controlled by the Pakistan Air Force, under the test series: Kirana-I. The first subcritical experiment on the first nuclear device took place on 11 March 1983. The diagnostics and the subcritical experiments continued on 24 different improved designs, developed by TPG, under Samar Mubarakmand of the Diagnostics Directorate and Hafeez Qureshi of Wah Group Scientist.

Hafeez Qureshi, alongside Samar Mubarakmand, oversaw the diagnostics and subcritical testing program of nuclear weapons as its test director until the full-scale nuclear testing (Chagai-I) was conducted at the Ras Koh Range in 1998.

== Death and honors ==
On 11 August 2007, Qureshi died from natural causes, aged 76. After his retirement, he served on the mechanical engineering faculty at the Pakistan Institute of Engineering and Applied Sciences, and was honored with his nation's highest honors including the Sitara-e-Imtiaz in 1992 and Hilal-e-Imtiaz in 2002 conferred by the President of Pakistan.

In 2023, the Government of Pakistan accepted the recommendation to honor his services with the Nishan-i-Imtiaz, which he was awarded in 2024.

== Bibliography ==
- Rahman, Shahid (1998). "§The Group at Wah". In Rahman, Shahid (ed.). Long Road to Chagai. Islamabad, Pakistan: Printwise publication. pp. 2–15 and 41–105. ISBN 978-969-8500-00-9.

== See also ==
- List of mechanical engineers
