= Peter Finke =

German theoretical physicist

- Born: 1944 (age 81–82); Bonn, Germany
- Citizenship: Germany and Pakistan
- Education: Max Planck Institute for Plasma Physics, Germany
- Known for: The Project-706; Nuclear structure experiment his work on the Quantum mechanics, Askaryan effect and Spectroscopy
- Awards: Hilal-i-Imtiaz (1989)
- Scientific career
- Fields: Theoretical Physics
- Workplaces: Pakistan Institute of Nuclear Science and Technology (PINSTECH); Physikalisch-Technische Bundesanstalt (PTB)
- Doctoral advisor: Dr. Heinrich Weichselgartner

Notes
- A close friend of Pakistani nuclear scientist and engineer Munir Ahmad Khan (late)

Peter Finke (born 1944) is a German theoretical physicist who participated in Project-706, Pakistan's clandestine nuclear research project. A close associate and friend of the famous Pakistani nuclear engineer Munir Ahmad Khan (late), he is citizen of both Pakistan and Germany. He is one of the European scientists who participated in Project-706 in the 1970s.

Finke is, perhaps, better known in much of the world for his involvement in the development of Beryllium reflector technology as well as selling this technology to Pakistan in the late 1980s. In 1989, Finke was arrested in Germany by the Interpol Police because of his involvement in nuclear proliferation. However, Germany dropped the allegations due to lack of evidence. Finke was sentenced to jail by the German court in 1989 because of violation of Germany's export control laws.

== Biography ==
=== Nuclear Proliferation ===
During the 1970s, Finke was working as a director at Physikalisch-Technische Bundesanstalt where he carried out research in the field of particle physics and was also serving as director of the atomic clock project. According to the Congressional investigation report of 1989, Finke smuggled sensitive nuclear detectors and nuclear technology to Pakistan in the late 1980s without notifying the German Government. The report also says that he also smuggled beryllium nuclear reflectors and sensitive research publications to Pakistan in 1972.

=== Project-706 ===
Finke, who was contacted by nuclear physicist turned-diplomat Siddique Ahmad Butt, better known as S. A. Butt, also passed on sensitive research publications to Butt. Finke first visited Pakistan when a German nuclear firm signed a civilian nuclear technology agreement with PAEC. However, later, Finke moved to Pakistan in 1975 to train Pakistani scientists in the field of nuclear reactor technology under the mutual agreement. When the German nuclear fuel supplier firm terminated the contract due to Finke's involvement in Project-706; Finke decided to live in Pakistan where he trained a number of Pakistani scientists in the field of nuclear reactor-device technology

=== PINSTECH career ===
Finke moved to Pakistan in 1980 where he joined Project-706 under the leadership of Munir Ahmad Khan and Abdul Qadeer Khan. Finke, eventually, worked at the Pakistan Institute of Nuclear Science and Technology (PINSTECH) as a researcher and produced a number of research publications along with his fellow Pakistani nuclear scientists. However, Finke was carefully excluded from Pakistan's nuclear weapons development program and was tasked to provide research publications. At PINSTECH, Peter Finke was involved in nuclear reactor technology where he researched and provided personal assistance to Pakistani scientists in nuclear reactor technology.

== Arrest and sentence to jail ==
In 1989, Finke was arrested through a joint operation of German Police and Interpol in Germany. The German court found him guilty and he served a jail term in a German Prison. Finke's personal information and details have been kept secret by the Governments of Pakistan and Germany. Both Pakistan and Germany refused to provide more details regarding the scientist. The trial went fast and most of the information regarding the case was not released by Pakistan and Germany to the international press. After serving his jail term, Finke has been monitored closely by intelligence agencies and was reported to have moved back to Pakistan with his family where he became a foreign professor of particle physics at the Quaid-i-Azam University, Islamabad.
