= Mujaddid Ahmed Ijaz =

Pakistani-American experimental physicist

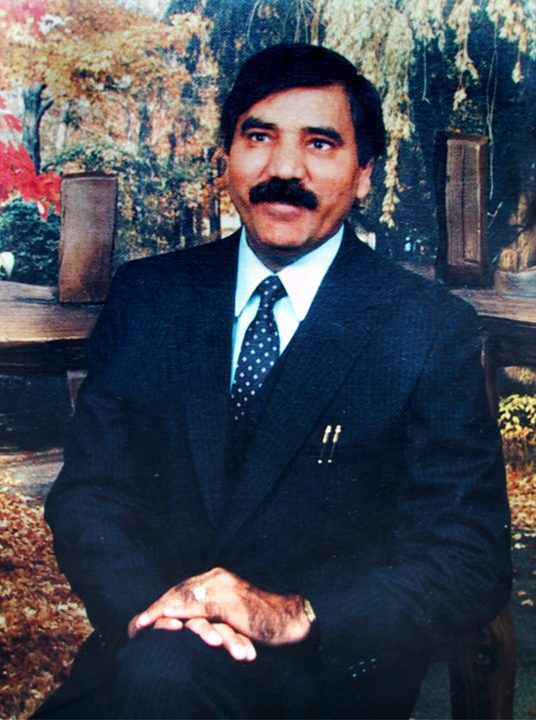
- Dr. Mujaddid Ahmed Ijaz in 1987
- Born: June 12, 1937; Lahore, British India
- Died: July 9, 1992 (aged 55); Shawsville, Virginia, U.S.A.
- Citizenship: United States
- Education: Government College Lahore; B.Sc. Physics, 1957; Florida State University; M.Sc. Nuclear Physics, 1962; Ohio University; Ph.D. Particle Physics, 1964
- Known for: Discovery of Isotopes; Atoms for Peace Program; Pakistan civil nuclear power
- Spouse(s): Lubna Razia Ijaz, Ph.D.
- Children: 5 including Musawer Mansoor Ijaz
- Awards: Fulbright Grant, 1975; Honorary Citizen, Tenn, 1972
- Scientific career
- Fields: Isotope research Experimental physics Particle physics Accelerator physics Symmetry (physics)
- Institutions: Virginia Tech; Oak Ridge National Labs; Brookhaven National Labs; Los Alamos National Labs; Argonne National Laboratory; Fermilab; I.C.T.P. (Trieste, Italy); Univ. Petroleum & Minerals
- Doctoral advisor: Basharat A. Munir, Ph.D.

Mujaddid Ahmed Ijaz (Urdu: مجدد احمد اعجا ز; June 12, 1937 – July 9, 1992) was a Pakistani-American experimental physicist noted for his role in discovering new isotopes that expanded the neutron-deficient side of the atomic chart. Some of the isotopes he discovered enabled significant advances in medical research, particularly in the treatment of cancer, and further advanced the experimental understanding of nuclear structures. Ijaz conducted his research work at Oak Ridge National Laboratories (ORNL). He and his ORNL colleagues published more than 60 papers in physics journals announcing isotope discoveries and other results of their accelerator experiments from 1968 until 1983.

Ijaz participated in the U.S. Atoms for Peace initiative during the 1970s. The program provided a number of third-world countries, including Pakistan, with civilian nuclear reactor technology to develop energy for peaceful purposes. As a tenured professor of physics at Virginia Tech, he acted as thesis adviser to graduate students from around the world in experimental physics disciplines. Ijaz made extensive trips abroad during his career, including sabbaticals as a visiting professor at Saudi Arabia's King Fahd University of Petroleum and Minerals. in the early 1980s and as a visiting faculty member at the Abdus Salam International Centre for Theoretical Physics in Trieste, Italy in 1985. He retired Professor Emeritus of Physics from Virginia Tech in December 1991 after a 27-year career in teaching and research. Ijaz and his wife emigrated to the United States and settled in Virginia, where they had five children. He died in 1992 after a battle with cancer.

== Early life and education ==
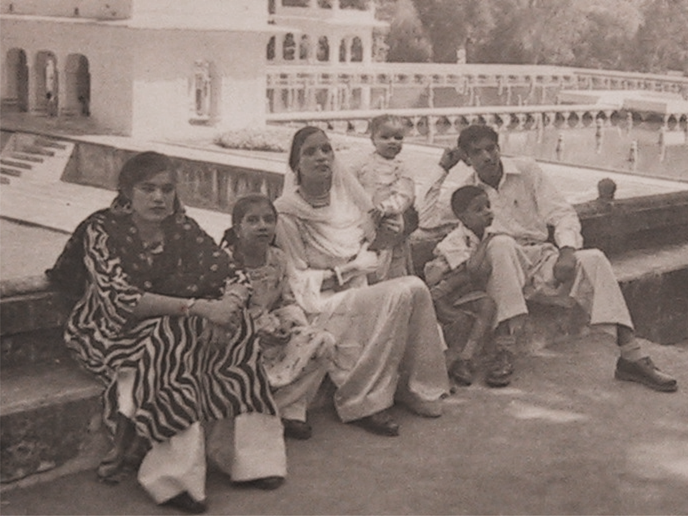
Ijaz with his mother and siblings, 1957

Mujaddid Ijaz was born on June 12, 1937, in Baddomalhi, British Indian Empire. His father was a medical student who died in his mid-20s of brain cancer. His mother, a homemaker, remarried. He was the third of ten children in his family. Ijaz's early education was made at rural village schools near Baddomalhi. He attended Islamia High School in Lahore. His early interest in science and physics was attributed to his step-father's work in the local meteorology department.

After graduating from high school and finishing college entrance exam requirements, Ijaz was admitted to Government College in Lahore. There, he majored in physics and graduated with a B.Sc. in 1957. He continued advanced studies under the tutelage of Prof. Rafi Muhammad Chaudhry, widely considered a pioneer in Pakistani experimental physics, until 1959 when he met Razia Begum Nazir. They later married and emigrated to the United States in 1960.

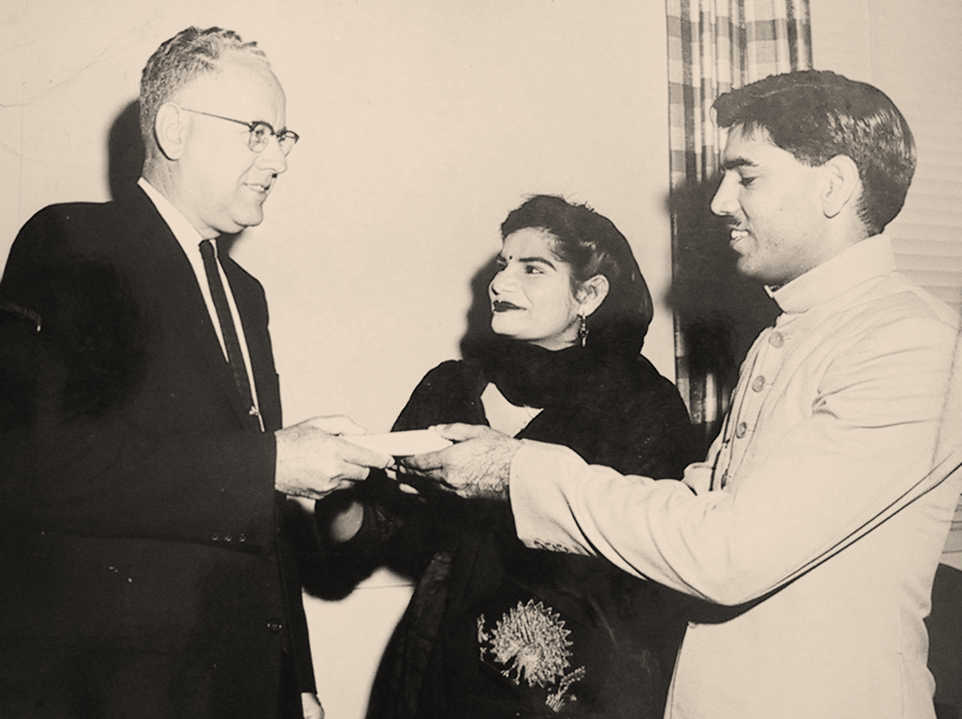
Ijaz gives a Quran to Gordon Blackwell, president of Florida State, 1960

Ijaz and his wife arrived in Tallahassee, Florida, in August 1960, where they settled as incoming graduate students at Florida State University. He developed an early interest in particle physics and accelerator experiments while at Florida State, from where he graduated in June 1962 with a master's degree in physics. His thesis was titled Study of Angular Distributions of Elastically Scattered 8 to 19 Mev Alpha Particles from Al27 and from Ohio University in May 1964 with a Ph.D. in Nuclear Physics with a thesis titled Proton-Proton Collisions at 2.0 BeV.

== Academic and scientific research career ==
=== Virginia Polytechnic Institute ===
Mujaddid Ijaz joined the faculty of the Virginia Tech Physics department in September 1964 as an assistant professor of physics. In his early years as a faculty member, Ijaz devoted much of his time to his teaching responsibilities, including acting as adviser to the university's roster of graduate students and doctoral candidates. He conducted his early research at the Physics department's newly installed nuclear reactor, which at the time was equipped with a neutron activation analysis laboratory. Ijaz's early experimental results earned him an appointment as research collaborator at the Oak Ridge National Laboratories in 1966 under a University Isotope Separator at Oak Ridge (UNISOR) grant funded by the U.S. Energy Department.

In 1974, Ijaz launched a Distinguished Visitors Colloquium Series under the Physics department's sponsorship that brought world-renowned physicists to the Blacksburg campus for nearly a decade. Visiting scholars included Salam, Sheldon Glashow, and Nobel physics laureates Hans Bethe, Robert Hofstadter, Eugene Wigner and Richard Feynman. Noted Chinese physicist Luke W. Mo (whose group at the Stanford Linear Accelerator had won the Nobel Prize in Physics in 1990) also lectured at Virginia Tech.

Ijaz attained the rank of Full Professor of Physics in 1977, and during the same year served as acting head of the physics department. After several foreign sabbaticals in the 1980s, the first at U.P.M. in Dhahran, Saudi Arabia from 1979 until 1981 and another at I.C.T.P. in 1985, he continued his teaching duties at Virginia Tech until retirement in December 1991 as Professor Emeritus of Physics. During the latter part of his career, Ijaz published papers that focused on methods and results in teaching, religion and science and other aspects of physics that did not form part of his technical research in earlier years. Also a physicist and teaching researcher at Virginia Tech, Lubna Razia Ijaz established a scholarship in 1996 that is awarded to students involved in physics education.

=== Oak Ridge National Laboratories ===
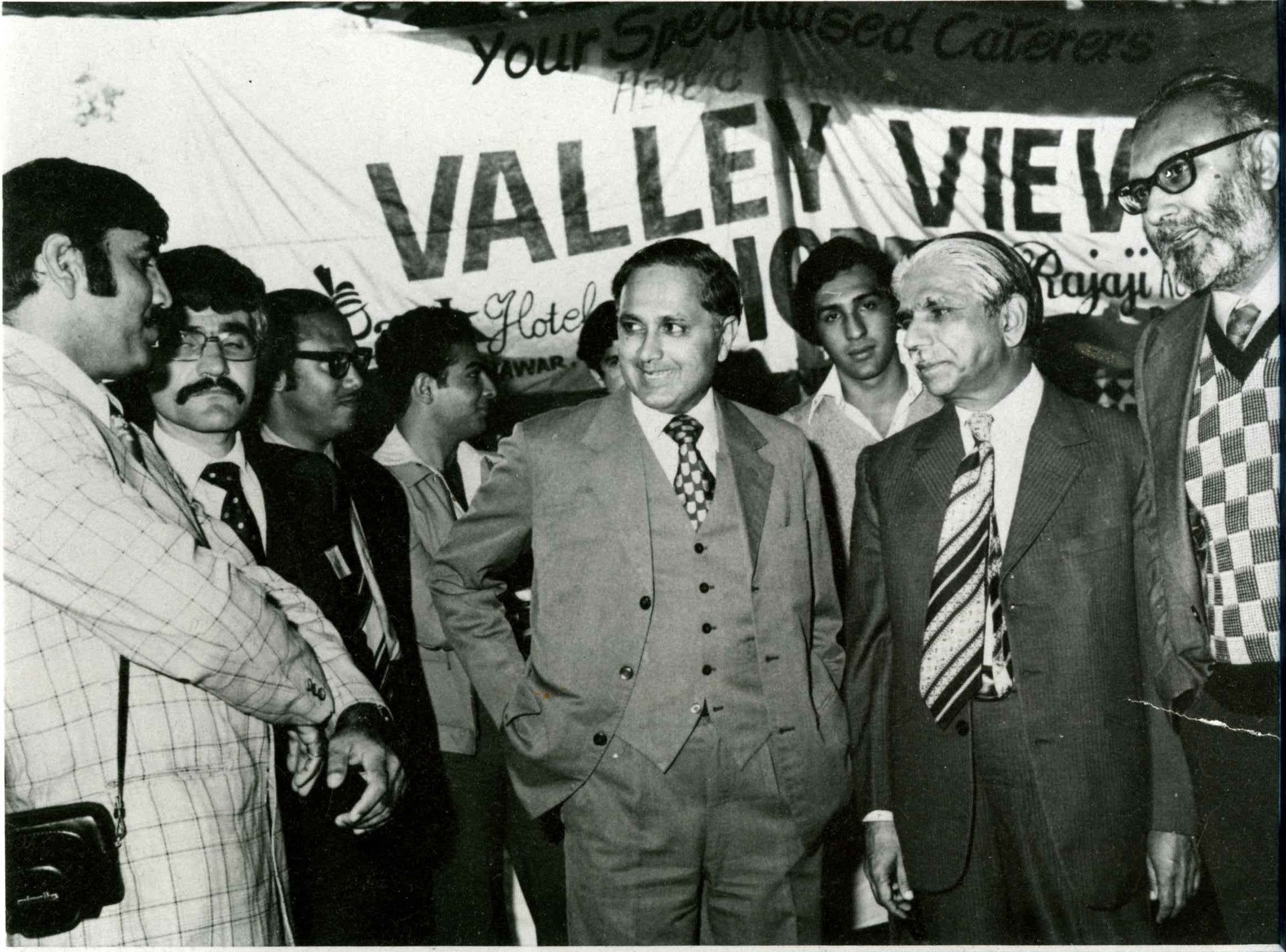
Ijaz (left) with Munir Khan & Abdus Salam (right), Nathiagali Physics Conference, 1976

Mujaddid Ijaz began his research work at the Oak Ridge National Laboratories (ORNL) in 1966 under Virginia Tech funding contributed to the UNISOR program. UNISOR was a consortium at that time of 13 institutions whose research scientists were collaborating at Oak Ridge supported by U.S. Energy Department grants together with Oak Ridge Associated Universities, of which Virginia Tech was one. Ijaz's research focused on the discovery of new isotopes using ORNL's High Flux Isotope Reactor. The reactor was built in 1965 with the highest neutron flux of any reactor at the time. It produced more medical isotopes while allowing higher fidelity of materials research than any other reactor available in the U.S. Energy Department's science and energy laboratory system during the 1970s. Ijaz and his colleagues at Oak Ridge, led by Kenneth S. Toth, used the High Flux Reactor to discover new isotopes and map characteristics of existing isotopes, including isotopes of Erbium, Ytterbium, Thulium, Osmium, Hafnium, Tungsten, Mercury, Titanium, and Lead. In December 1982, physicists at the University of Arizona used the mercury isotopes discovered by Toth, Ijaz et al. to successfully model behavior expected of heavier particles than traditional accelerator experiments could produce at the time due to energy limitations.

During the 1970s, Ijaz participated in the Atoms for Peace initiative created by President Eisenhower in 1953 to help the post-World War II international community cope with nuclear power. Pakistan's first facility, a 5 MW PARR-I pool-type facility, was provided by the United States in 1965. The reactor began operations on December 21, 1965, under the supervision of Pakistani scientists led by Abdus Salam.

=== Notable collaborations ===
Mujaddid Ijaz collaborated with notable physicists and mathematicians throughout his 27-year career. Most notable among these were his collaborations with Abdus Salam whose groundbreaking work in electroweak interactions together with American physicists Steven Weinberg and Sheldon Glashow earned them the Nobel Prize in Physics in 1979.

In 1976, Salam recommended creating an international forum for the advancement of science and technology to be hosted by Pakistan in the Hazara region while serving as Science Advisor to the Prime Minister of Pakistan. Since then, the Nathiagali Physics Conferences has gathered notable scientists from around the world during summer breaks to break the intellectual isolation faced by Pakistani scientists. Ijaz participated in these conferences several times during the mid-1970s under National Science Foundation grants. He was also a member of the National Academy of Sciences and a fellow of the American Physical Society.

== Personal life ==
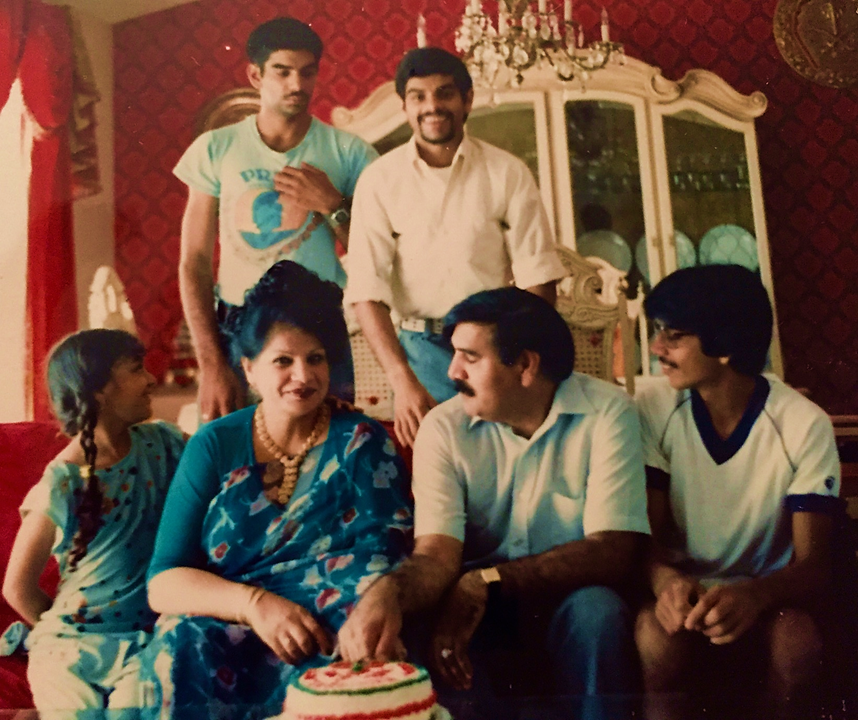
Mujaddid & Lubna Ijaz with their children in Virginia, 1982

Mujaddid Ijaz was an Ahmadi. He married Razia Begum (nee Nazir) in June 1960 prior to emigrating to the United States. Razia later took her husband's chosen name, Lubna, when they both became naturalized American citizens on January 5, 1970. They had five children: Mansoor, Farouk, Atif and Mujeeb. Neelam, their only daughter, was born in Pakistan.

The Ijazes initially settled in Blacksburg, where Virginia Tech was situated, and lived there from 1964 until 1969. After several years of living in the rural community of Floyd, Virginia, they returned to Christiansburg, a township near Virginia Tech, in 1973, building a home in the Appalachian Mountains that today remains the family's homestead.

Mujaddid Ijaz died on July 9, 1992, at his home in Shawsville, Virginia, of complications arising from a protracted battle with brain and lung cancer. He was buried in traditional Muslim rituals at the site of his most favored farm in Alum Ridge, surrounded by a large gathering of his family from around the United States and his physics colleagues and friends from southwestern Virginia. President George H. W. Bush consoled Ijaz's widow in a letter dated July 24, 1992.

== Selected publications ==
- Campbell, J.E.; Ijaz, M.A. (1969). "A study of resonance production in six-pronged π^{−}p interactions at 7.0 GeV/c". Nuclear Physics B. 12 (3): 549–560. Bibcode:1969NuPhB..12..549C. doi:10.1016/0550-3213(69)90073-X.
- Ijaz, M. A.; Campbell, J. E. (1969). "Distribution of transverse and longitudinal momentum in π–p interactions at 7.0 GeV/c". Il Nuovo Cimento A. 61 (2): 307–319. Bibcode:1969NCimA..61..307I. doi:10.1007/BF02755134. S2CID 117072050.
- Ijaz, M. A.; Campbell, J. E.; Naeem, A. (1968). "Transverse momentum distribution of pions in two and six prong events from π^{−}–p collisions at 7.0 GeV/c". Canadian Journal of Physics. 46 (23): 2663–2668. Bibcode:1968CaJPh..46.2663I. doi:10.1139/p68-632.
- Ijaz, M.A.; Campbell, J. (1968). "Some characteristic features of six prong π^{−}p interactions at 7.0 GeV/c". Nuclear Physics B. 7 (3): 175–182. Bibcode:1968NuPhB...7..175I. doi:10.1016/0550-3213(68)90258-7.
