= Iqbal Hussain Qureshi =

- Born: 27 September 1937; Ajmer, Rajasthan, British India (Present-day, in Rajasthan in India)
- Died: 8 December 2012 (aged 75); Karachi, Sindh, Pakistan
- Resting place: Gizri Cemetery
- Citizenship: Pakistan
- Education: Sindh University; University of Michigan; University of Tokyo
- Known for: Pakistan's nuclear deterrence program Radiochemistry and isotope separation
- Awards: Sitara-i-Imtiaz (1992); Khwarizmi Award (1997)
- Scientific career
- Fields: Nuclear chemistry
- Workplaces: Pakistan Atomic Energy Commission (PAEC); Institute of Applied Sciences; Nuclear Regulatory Authority; National Bureau of Standards
- Thesis: Radiochemical separations by Amalgam exchange (1963)
- Doctoral advisor: Takashi Mukaibo
- Other academic advisors: W. W. Meinke
- Website: Eulogy by N.M. Butt

Iqbal Hussain Qureshi (Urdu: اقبال حسين قریشی) (27 September 1937 – 8 December 2012) SI, FPAS, best known as I.H. Qureshi, was a Pakistani nuclear chemist and an Emeritus professor of chemistry at the University of Karachi. Qureshi was the principal contributor of scientific understanding of various chemical elements: bismuth, cobalt, strontium, thallium, tritium, iron, rubidium, and zinc.

His career was mostly spent with the Government of Pakistan after leaving his research work at the national laboratories, and advising the government on nuclear policy issues. He pushed his influential role at the Nuclear Regulatory Authority (PNRA) and the peaceful applications of nuclear science. He spent many years as an educator and research scientist at the Institute of Engineering and Applied Sciences in Nilore before taking a professorship at the Karachi University.

== Biography ==
Iqbal Hussain Qureshi was born on 27 September 1937 in Ajmer, Rajasthan in India where he received his early education. Following the Partition of India in 1947, his family emigrated to Pakistan and settled in Hyderabad, Sindh, where he matriculated from a public high school. He was a child prodigy, being accepted at the Sindh University in his teenage years to study chemistry. In 1956, he graduated with a Bachelor of Science (BSc) in chemistry from the Sindh University and was noted in newspapers for his top standing in his class, winning the silver medallion with his degree. He continued his studies at the Sindh University, and graduated in 1958 with a Master of Science (MSc) in chemistry with Gold medallion.

After earning a scholarship from the Pakistan Atomic Energy Commission (PAEC) in 1960, Qureshi went to the United States to attend the University of Michigan and graduated in 1962 with an MSc in nuclear chemistry. He went to Japan for his doctoral studies, attending the University of Tokyo where in 1963 he defended his thesis, "Radiochemical separations by Amalgam exchange", which contained fundamental work on chemical amalgam applications in radiochemistry. In 1994, his biography was written and published by the University of Michigan in American Men & Women of Science: A Biographical Directory of Today's Leaders in Physical, Biological, and Related Sciences journal.

In 1967, Qureshi returned to the United States and briefly worked for the US National Bureau of Standards as a postdoctoral researcher before leaving for Denmark in 1969. In Denmark, he received training in the areas of uranium and plutonium isotope separation, which was vital when he returned to Pakistan in 1971 with his expertise and knowledge.

=== Pakistan Atomic Energy Commission ===
In 1960, Qureshi found employment with the Pakistan Atomic Energy Commission (PAEC), and was posted to the Atomic Energy Center in Lahore where his interest built in radiochemistry. Upon returning to Pakistan from Denmark in 1971, he joined the Institute of Nuclear Science and Technology (the national lab) in Nilore, working at the Nuclear Chemistry Division (NCD).

As early as 1972, Qureshi joined the team of scientists that began working on the equation of state of the radioactive decay element plutonium, while he established the computerized radiation detection chemical analysis laboratories at the Pakistan Institute of Nuclear Science and Technology in 1973. In 1974, Qureshi and his team was instrumental at the national laboratory when he was the first to confirm the detection of radiation emissions coming from Rajasthan in India. Hence, by using neutron activation analysis, confirming Pokhran-I the first Indian nuclear test, which India later announced was indeed conducted at the Pokhran Test Range. Notably, he led the team that balanced the chemical equation required for the exothermic chemical reaction in fission devices. By 1977, he discovered the technique for balancing the nuclear Q-value and energy balance in a boosted fission weapon.

Eventually, Qureshi headed the Nuclear Chemistry Division (NCD) at the Institute of Nuclear Science and Technology which was responsible for the multi-stage chemical process that separated, concentrated and isolated plutonium from uranium. At NCD, he also played a supervisory role in developing the Analytical Chemistry Group comprising modern and state of the art analytical chemistry laboratories such as the Analytical Chemistry Laboratory, Atomic Absorption Spectroscopy lab, Emission Spectrography lab, Chromatography lab, Electrochemical Analysis lab and radioisotope production labs. The Analytical Chemistry Laboratory was later certified by the International Atomic Energy Agency (IAEA), and oversaw the successful commissioning of the PARR-III reactor that went 'phase critical' in 1973.

Qureshi engaged in research about copper-nickel alloys after introducing the lattice dynamical method to evaluate the Cu_{29}/Ni_{28} alloys. Key and fundamental research on understanding neutron flux was carried out by Qureshi, for which he managed to secure patents from the IAEA. After the conclusion of the Pakistan's clandestine atomic bomb projects, he was appointed chief technical officer at the Pakistan Atomic Energy Commission (PAEC) in 1991; though he was more eager to return to academia.

Throughout his time at PAEC, Qureshi earned several scientific honors, including the Gold Medal and a Fellowship of the Pakistan Academy of Sciences in 1994. He was a recipient of the Sitara-i-Imtiaz (Star of Excellence) from the Government of Pakistan in 1992. In 1997, from the Iranian Government, he received the Khwarizmi International Award for advancing and understanding the "Nuclear analytical techniques development and application in Pakistan".

=== Academia and government work ===
In 1996, Qureshi retired from PAEC as Chief Scientific Officer and was made scientist emeritus, which allowed him to continue research at PINSTECH before moving to Karachi. He took up the professorship of chemistry at the Karachi University and headed the nuclear chemistry section at the H.E.J. Research Institute of Chemistry. During this time, he authored several articles and published books on nuclear chemistry. He retained his position till 2001 when he joined the Pakistan Nuclear Regulatory Authority (PNRA).

At PNRA, Qureshi served as the chief scientific officer and adviser to the government on nuclear policy issues. His contribution and policy efforts led to the physical security of the commercial nuclear power infrastructure in the country and helped launched the nuclear awareness campaign following the Fukushima nuclear disaster in 2011. He served until 2009 when he decided to accept the professorship of chemistry at the Institute of Engineering and Applied Sciences. In December 2012 Qureshi had a sudden breathing problem and died. He is buried in Karachi, Sindh.

=== Personal life and interests ===
In Pakistan's academia and nuclear society, Qureshi was well known for his interests in classical music theory and love of playing the guitar and sitar, which he played on several occasions. He also had an interest in American poetry, which he often quoted among his peers while working on the bomb program, and played tennis avidly during his later life. He was married twice; his first wife died in the 1980s and he later remarried. He had two sons, one a neurosurgeon while the other is a computer scientist.
