= Shaukat Hameed Khan =

Pakistani optical physicist and a visiting professor

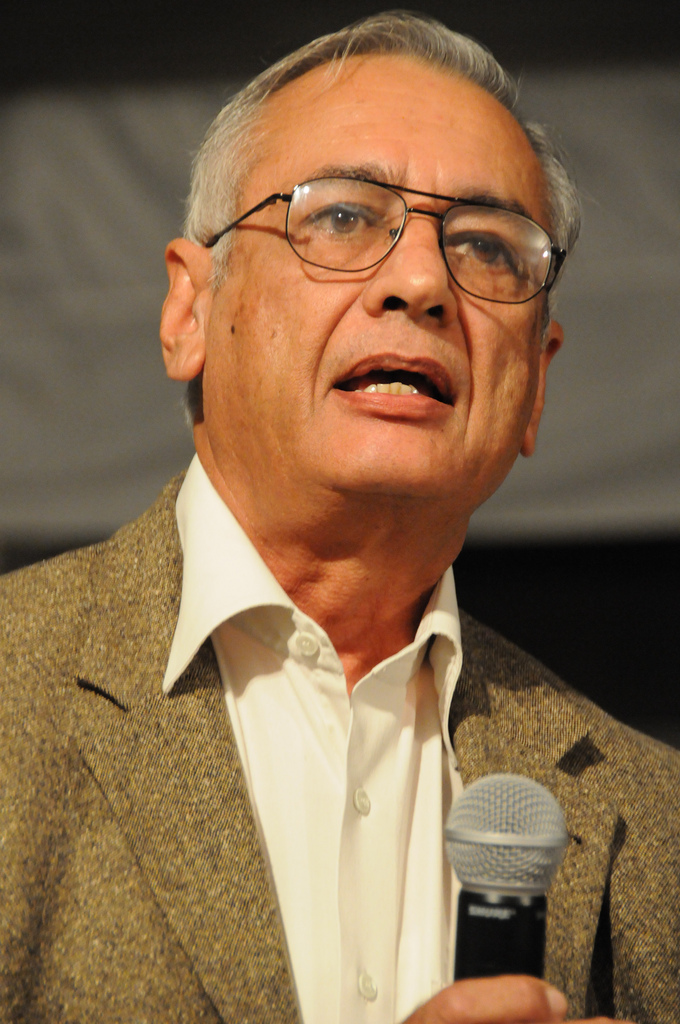
- Born: September 4, 1941 (age 84); Lahore, Punjab, British India (Present day in Punjab in Pakistan.)
- Education: Gordon College; University of Oxford
- Known for: Laser science: AVLIS development and plasma stealth Pakistan's nuclear deterrent program
- Awards: Pride of Performance (1993)
- Scientific career
- Fields: Optical physics
- Workplaces: Pakistan Atomic Energy Commission; CERN; GIK Institute of Technology; Comsats University; University of Sialkot
- Thesis: The Laser Triggered Spark Gap (1969)
- Website: pas site

Shaukat Hameed Khan (Urdu: شوکت حمید خان; born 4 September 1941) PP, PhD, FPAS, is a Pakistani optical physicist and a visiting professor of physics at the Comsats University in Islamabad. Khan is known for his understanding in spark gap and plasma-induced Lasers in ionized environment.

His career is mostly spent at the Pakistan Atomic Energy Commission before taking professorship at the GIK Institute of Technology and Engineering and eventually becoming its rector. Besides teaching educating on physics, Khan is known for his strong public advocacy for scientific education in Pakistan and sustainable development through technology.

== Biography ==
Khan was born in Lahore, Punjab in British Indian Empire on 4 September 1941 and completed his matriculation in Lahore. In 1957, Khan enrolled at the Gordon College in Lahore where he graduated with BSc with honors in physics in 1961, and earned the Rhodes scholarship that allowed him to study in the United Kingdom.

He attended the University of Oxford in England, and graduating with BA in mathematics in 1964, and BSE in electrical engineering in 1965 from the Oxford University. He started his doctoral studies in physics and became interested in optics and theory of Light– the electromagnetic radiation. At Oxford, he played cricket for Brasenose College, and was noted as a pace bowler. He was also President of the Oxford Majlis Asia Society in 1962.

His classical work at the Oxford University was based on the gas laser based on the nitrogen filled gas tube through the spark gap. His research work was supported by the funding made possible to study the applications of Lasers by the United States, whose agency, the DTIC eventually released his thesis work as public domain. In 1968, Khan submitted his doctoral thesis, titled: The Laser Triggered Spark Gap, which was approved in 1969, and was conferred with PhD in physics with laser applications in 1969 by the University of Oxford.

== Career in Pakistan government ==
=== Pakistan Atomic Energy Commission ===
In 1969, Khan returned to his native country, Pakistan, with doctorate in optical physics but found research interests in the applications of nuclear physics when he found employment with the Pakistan Atomic Energy Commission (PAEC). Khan was instrumental figure in establishing the Laser Group in 1969, serving its first founding director until 1981. In December 1971, he met with Munir Ahmad Khan, a reactor physicist, and later attending the conference that was instrumental in decision-making process of developing nuclear weapons program in January 1972.

His career mostly spent at the Institute of Nuclear Science and Technology, a national laboratory site, where his earlier work was focused towards designing and building the Laser rangefinder for the Pakistan Army in 1970s, building several prototypes for the military. After India's nuclear test in 1974, Khan's interest built in weapon-grade enrichment of U^{238} and was of the view of employing a complex laser-based isotope separation as opposed to relatively easier gaseous centrifuges which was being favored by Bashiruddin Mehmood at that time. Despite his expertise and advocacy, the program went in favor of employing the gaseous centrifuges method initially under Bashiruddin Mehmood in 1974 but later went to qualified scientist, Dr. Abdul Qadeer Khan in 1976. Nonetheless, Khan continued working on laser-based isotope separation with support provided by Munir Ahmad Khan and later used his expertise in laser-based atomic isotope separation of Pu^{239} in successive years– an interest in his research that he remained passioned throughout his career.

In 1981, Khan went to established Optics Laboratory within the Institute of Nuclear Science and Technology in Nilore, of which, he served its first director. In 1990, Khan was at a center of controversy when his laser rangefinder program caught between the rivalry with the Khan Research Laboratories (KRL) in Kahuta. The MoD awarded a contract to conduct preliminary studies in laser rangefinders for the Pakistani military and a prototype was successfully performed alongside British, American, Russian and Chinese LRF programs. The federal contract and the funding was later directed to KRL in Kahuta as a preference, and there was a story published in the Pakistan Observer in 1990–91. In 1998, Khan became the chief scientist at the PAEC, and participated with his optics team in eye-witnessing the nuclear testings in Balochistan in Pakistan.

=== Public service and government work ===
In 2005, Khan retired from the Pakistan Atomic Energy Commission as chief scientist and joined the Planning Commission as a consultant, attaching to the Ministry of Industry (MoInd). Khan provided the strong advocacy for the Vision 2030 program of which he was its director— the Vision 2030 was a policy measure program that aimed towards defining a preferred future for Pakistan from several possible futures.

In 2009, Khan left the planning commission and affiliated with the Pakistan Institute of Development Economics (PIDC) till 2010 when he accepted an advisory position at the Ministry of Industry in 2010. During this time, Khan served on the board of directors of the Heavy Mechanical Complex and later served as the chairman of the Rhodes Selection Committee. In 2014, he joined the COMSTECH as its chief coordinator till 2020.

=== Academia and public advocacy ===
In 2007, Khan joined the Ghulam Ishaq Khan Institute of Engineering and Technology and briefly taught courses on physics before becoming its rector in 2008 till 2009. He later instructed courses on physics at the University of Sialkot and later became the university's technical adviser on building up the research engineering programs at the university. In 2014, he joined the faculty of science at the Comsats University in Islamabad and was later elevated its chief coordinator. In 1969, Khan authored a textbook on Lasers, titled: The Laser Triggered Spark gap, which is roughly based on his doctoral thesis, as well authoring a college textbook, "Optics" for graduates in physics and engineering in 1998.

At the public circles, Khan is known for his strong public advocacy for science education, and is a member on a platform of Pakistan Tehreek-e-Insaf since 2012.

== Work in CERN ==
In 1999, the Pakistan Atomic Energy Commission approved Khan's candidacy to join the CERN in Switzerland as a senior scientist and a program director for the optics system and Lasers that were installed at the Large Hadron Collider. At CERN, Khan was the chief designer and had helped design the Compact Muon Solenoid employed in the Large Hadron Collider project at CERN in Geneva. Khan serves as the co-chairman of Information Communication Technologies taskforce. Refer to the CMS Bulletin from March 1999 (page 13/39) In 2001, Khan left CERN and re-joined PAEC; he was appointed director of PAEC in 2002. In 2002, Khan headed the Plasma physics lab at PAEC and printed numerous scientific articles about the discoveries in laser and plasma physics. He founded the laser programme in Pakistan which has now grown into the Optics Laboratories and a National Institute of Lasers and Optronics with several hundred researchers. He also established the plasma physics research institutes in Pakistan.

== Awards ==
=== Awards and honors ===
- National Talent Scholar, (1959–61)
- Gold Medal from the Punjab University (1961)
- Best All-Round Student, Gordon College (1961)
- An elected Rhodes Scholar, Oxford University (1962)
- Pride of Performance (1993)
- Technology Gold Medal from Pakistan Academy of Sciences (1993)

=== Bibliography ===
- Khan, Shaukat Hameed, The laser triggered spark gap (Second Edition) (1969), University of Oxford Press
- Khan, Shaukat Hameed, Optics (1998), University of Punjab Press.

== See also ==
- Optical physics
- List of plasma physicists
