= List of nuclear weapons tests of Pakistan =

Chagai-I
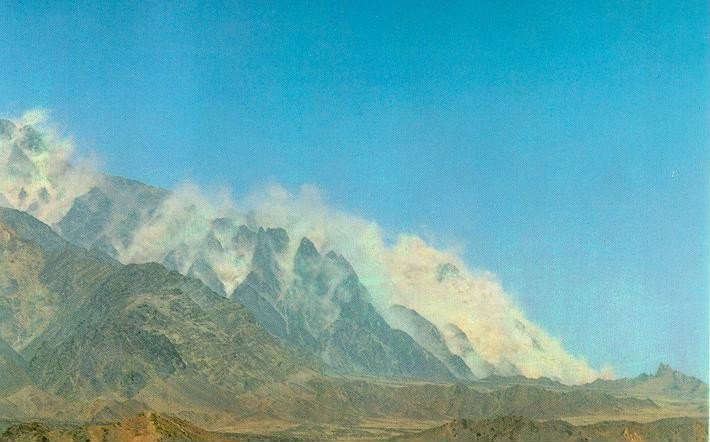
- The white dust expulsion from the Ras Koh Hills following the underground nuclear detonation.

Information
- Country: Pakistan
- Test site: Ras Koh Range, Balochistan
- Period: 1998
- Number of tests: 2 (6 devices fired)
- Test type: Underground tests (tunnel) on granite rocky mountain.
- Device type: Fusion-boosted Fission
- Max. yield: 32 kilotonnes of TNT (130 TJ)

The nuclear weapons tests of Pakistan refers to a test program directed towards the development of nuclear explosives and investigation of the effects of nuclear explosions. The program was suggested by Munir Ahmad Khan, chairman of the Pakistan Atomic Energy Commission (PAEC), as early as 1976.

Construction of the weapon-testing sites took place in 1976–77 under the guidelines of the Pakistan Army Corps of Engineers as a civil engineering consultant and lead.

The first subcritical testing was carried out in 1983 by PAEC, codenamed Kirana-I, and continued upon under the second administration of Prime Minister Benazir Bhutto. Subcritical testing, scientific viability and engineering validation of devices functationality were carried out in Kirana by Pakistan Institute of Nuclear Science & Technology, Metallurgical Laboratory in Wah, and the Khan Research Laboratories in Kahuta but it was ultimately the Pakistan Atomic Energy Commission's responsibility to undertake and carried out the tests as a civilian oversight agency.

In a view of establishing the balance of power with India in South Asia, Prime Minister Nawaz Sharif signed executive orders that authorize the nuclear weapons testing in May 1998. Total of six devices were fired in steel-iron tunnels constructed by the Pakistan Army Corps of Engineers as early as 1977.

In 1999, Indian Prime Minister Atal Vajpayee made a state visit to Pakistan to meet with the Prime Minister Nawaz Sharif in Lahore and which saw the both countries signed a nuclear testing control treaty, the Lahore Declaration in 1999.

== Testing series ==
=== Chagai-I ===
The Pakistan's Chagai-I nuclear test series was a single nuclear test conducted in 1998.

Pakistan's Chagai I series tests and detonations These five devices constitute a single salvo test under the definition of "test" in List of nuclear weapons tests.
Name (Note: The US, France and Great Britain have code-named their test events, while the USSR and China did not, and therefore have only test numbers (with some exceptions – Soviet peaceful explosions were named). Word translations into English in parentheses unless the name is a proper noun. A dash followed by a number indicates a member of a salvo event. The US also sometimes named the individual explosions in such a salvo test, which results in "name1 – 1(with name2)". If test is canceled or aborted, then the row data like date and location discloses the intended plans, where known.)	Date time (UT)	Local time zone (Note: To convert the UT time into standard local, add the number of hours in parentheses to the UT time; for local daylight saving time, add one additional hour. If the result is earlier than 00:00, add 24 hours and subtract 1 from the day; if it is 24:00 or later, subtract 24 hours and add 1 to the day.)	Location (Note: Rough place name and a latitude/longitude reference; for rocket-carried tests, the launch location is specified before the detonation location, if known. Some locations are extremely accurate; others (like airdrops and space blasts) may be quite inaccurate. "~" indicates a likely pro-forma rough location, shared with other tests in that same area.)	Elevation + height (Note: Elevation is the ground level at the point directly below the explosion relative to sea level; height is the additional distance added or subtracted by tower, balloon, shaft, tunnel, air drop or other contrivance. For rocket bursts the ground level is "N/A". In some cases it is not clear if the height is absolute or relative to ground, for example, Plumbbob/John. No number or units indicates the value is unknown, while "0" means zero. Sorting on this column is by elevation and height added together.)	Delivery, (Note: Atmospheric, airdrop, balloon, gun, cruise missile, rocket, surface, tower, and barge are all disallowed by the Partial Nuclear Test Ban Treaty. Sealed shaft and tunnel are underground, and remained useful under the PTBT. Intentional cratering tests are borderline; they occurred under the treaty, were sometimes protested, and generally overlooked if the test was declared to be a peaceful use.) Purpose (Note: Include weapons development, weapon effects, safety test, transport safety test, war, science, joint verification and industrial/peaceful, which may be further broken down.)	Device (Note: Designations for test items where known, "?" indicates some uncertainty about the preceding value, nicknames for particular devices in quotes. This category of information is often not officially disclosed.)	Yield (Note: Estimated energy yield in tons, kilotons, and megatons. A ton of TNT equivalent is defined as 4.184 gigajoules (1 gigacalorie).)	Fallout (Note: Radioactive emission to the atmosphere aside from prompt neutrons, where known. The measured species is only iodine-131 if mentioned, otherwise it is all species. No entry means unknown, probably none if underground and "all" if not; otherwise notation for whether measured on the site only or off the site, where known, and the measured amount of radioactivity released.)	References	Notes
Chagai 1 - 1	28 May 1998 10:16:15.8	PKT (+5 hrs)	Ras Koh, Pakistan 28.79273°N 64.94565°E	1,298 m (4,259 ft) +	tunnel,		32 kt			Boosted fission device. Notice debris from light rock band slumped downhill from shaking. No official word on what happened in the test. A. Q. Khan, well connected but considered unreliable, says 1 large and 4 small devices detonated.
Chagai 1 - 2	28 May 1998 10:16:15.8	PKT (+5 hrs)	Ras Koh, Pakistan 28.79273°N 64.94565°E	1,298 m (4,259 ft) +	tunnel,		1 kt			Boosted fission device. Notice debris from light rock band slumped downhill from shaking.
Chagai 1 - 3	28 May 1998 10:16:15.8	PKT (+5 hrs)	Ras Koh, Pakistan 28.79273°N 64.94565°E	1,298 m (4,259 ft) +	tunnel,		1 kt			Boosted fission device.
Chagai 1 - 4	28 May 1998 10:16:15.8	PKT (+5 hrs)	Ras Koh, Pakistan 28.79273°N 64.94565°E	1,298 m (4,259 ft) +	tunnel,		1 kt			Boosted fission device.
Chagai 1 - 5	28 May 1998 10:16:15.8	PKT (+5 hrs)	Ras Koh, Pakistan 28.79273°N 64.94565°E	1,298 m (4,259 ft) +	tunnel,		1 kt			Boosted fission device.

=== Chagai II ===
Chagai II
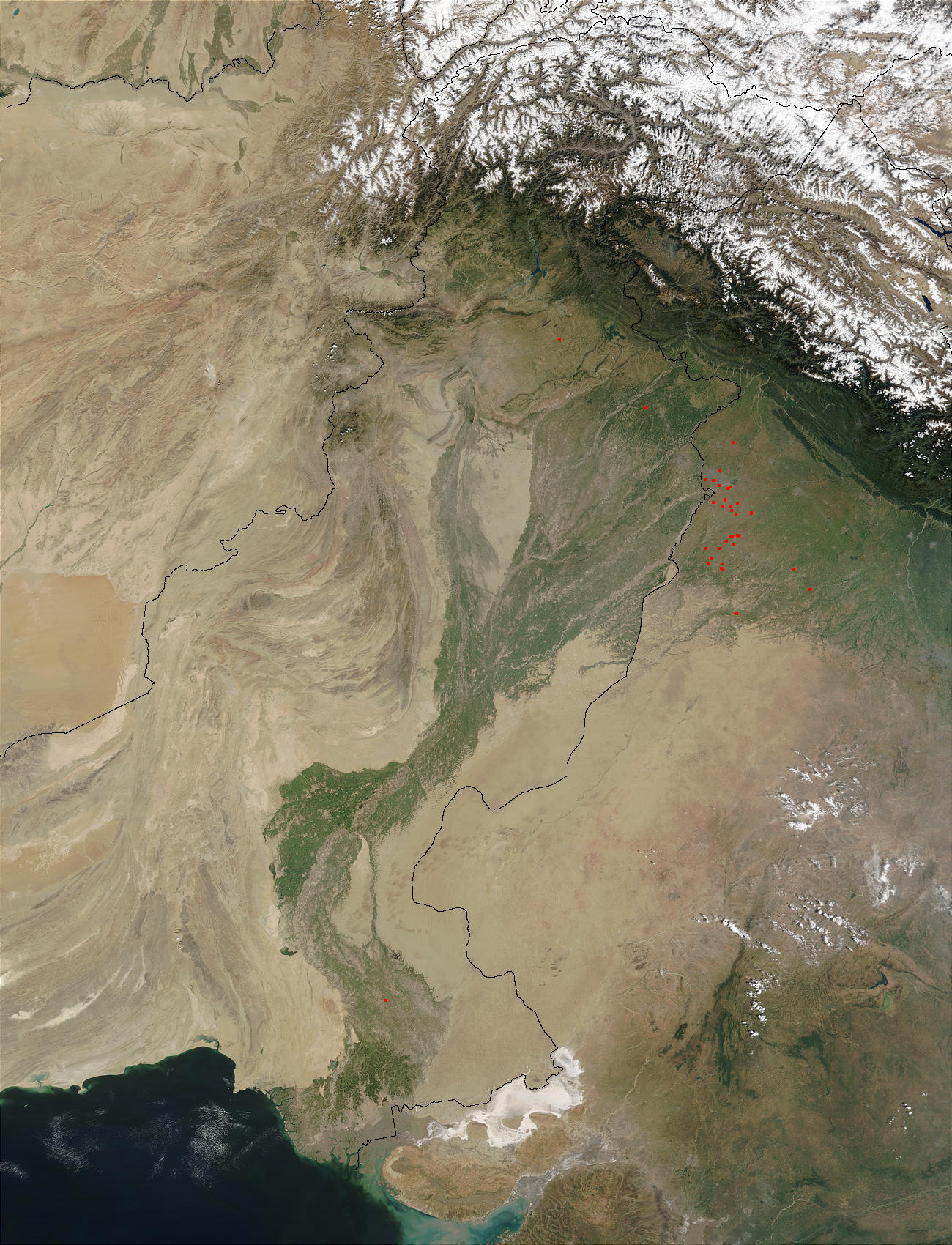
- Satellite image of Kharan Desert

Information
- Country: Pakistan
- Test site: Kharan Desert, Pakistan
- Period: 1998
- Number of tests: 1
- Test type: Underground shaft
- Device type: Fission
- Max. yield: 15 kilotonnes of TNT (63 TJ)

Test series chronology

The Pakistan's Chagai II nuclear test series was a single nuclear test conducted in 1998. These tests followed the Chagai-I series .

The Pakistan test series summary table is below.

The detonations in the Pakistan's Chagai-II series are listed below:

Pakistan's Chagai II series tests and detonations
Name (Note: The US, France and Great Britain have code-named their test events, while the USSR and China did not, and therefore have only test numbers (with some exceptions - Soviet peaceful explosions were named). Word translations into English in parentheses unless the name is a proper noun. A dash followed by a number indicates a member of a salvo event. The US also sometimes named the individual explosions in such a salvo test, which results in "name1 - 1(with name2)". If test is canceled or aborted, then the row data like date and location discloses the intended plans, where known.)	Date time (UT)	Local time zone (Note: To convert the UT time into standard local, add the number of hours in parentheses to the UT time; for local daylight saving time, add one additional hour. If the result is earlier than 00:00, add 24 hours and subtract 1 from the day; if it's 24:00 or later, subtract 24 hours and add 1 to the day. Historical time zone data obtained from the IANA time zone database.)	Location (Note: Rough place name and a Latitude/Longitude reference; for rocket-carried tests, the launch location is specified before the detonation location, if known. Some locations are extremely accurate; others (like airdrops and space blasts) may be quite inaccurate. "~" indicates a likely pro-forma rough location, shared with other tests in that same area.)	Elevation + height (Note: Elevation is the ground level at the point directly below the explosion relative to sea level; height is the additional distance added or subtracted by tower, balloon, shaft, tunnel, air drop or other contrivance. For rocket bursts the ground level is "N/A". In some cases it is not clear if the height is absolute or relative to ground, for example, Plumbbob/John. No number or units indicates the value is unknown, while "0" means zero. Sorting on this column is by elevation and height added together.)	Delivery (Note: Atmospheric, airdrop, balloon, gun, cruise missile, rocket, surface, tower, and barge are all disallowed by the Partial Nuclear Test Ban Treaty. Sealed shaft and tunnel are underground, and remained useful under the PTBT. Intentional cratering tests are borderline; they occurred under the treaty, were sometimes protested, and generally overlooked if the test was declared to be a peaceful use.)	Purpose (Note: Include weapons development, weapon effects, safety test, transport safety test, war, science, joint verification and industrial/peaceful, which may be further broken down.)	Device (Note: Designations for test items where known, "?" indicates some uncertainty about the preceding value, nicknames for particular devices in quotes. This category of information is often not officially disclosed.)	Yield (Note: Estimated energy yield in tons, kilotons, and megatons.)	Fallout (Note: Radioactive emission to the atmosphere aside from prompt neutrons, where known. The measured species is only iodine-131 if mentioned, otherwise it is all species. No entry means unknown, probably none if underground and "all" if not; otherwise notation for whether measured on the site only or off the site, where known, and the measured amount of radioactivity released.)	References	Notes
Chagai 2	30 May 1998 06:54:57.1	PKT (+5 hrs)	Kharan Desert, Pakistan 28.35828°N 63.85882°E	580 m (1,900 ft) - 36 m (118 ft)	underground shaft			15 kt			Miniaturized boosted fission device.

== Summary ==
Pakistan's nuclear testing series summary - Link to world summary of nuclear weapons tests
Series or years	Years covered	Tests (Note: Includes all tests with potential for nuclear fission or fusion explosion, including combat use, singleton tests, salvo tests, zero yield fails, safety experiments, and bombs incapacitated by accidents but still intended to be fired. It does not include hydronuclear and subcritical tests, and misfires of a device which was subsequently fired successfully.)	Devices fired	Devices with unknown yield	Peaceful use tests	Non-PTBT tests (Note: Number of tests which would have been in violation of the Partial Test Ban Treaty of 1963, such as atmospheric, space or underwater tests. Some "peaceful use" cratering tests which should have been violations were protested, and later quietly dropped.)	Yield range (kilotons) (Note: "Small" refers to a value greater than zero but less than 0.5 kt.)	Total yield (kilotons) (Note: Some yields are described like "< 20 kt"; such are scored at one half of the numeric amount, i.e., yield of 10k in this example. "Unknown yield" adds nothing to the total.)	Notes
Chagai I	1998	1	5				1 to 32	36	
Chagai II	1998	1	1				15	15	
Totals	1998-May-28 to 1998-May-30	2	6				1 to 32	51	Total country yield is 0.0094% of all nuclear testing.

== Sources ==
- Andryushi, LA; Voloshin, N.P.; Ilkaev, R.I.; Matushchenko, A.M.; Ryabev, L.D.; Strukov, V.G.; Chernyshev, A.K.; Yudin, Yu.A., Mikhailov, V.N. (ed.), Catalog of Worldwide Nuclear Testing, archived from the original on 19 December 2013
- Wm Robert Johnston, PhD, Johnston Archive of Nuclear Weapons
