= International Nathiagali Summer College on Physics =

Physics outreach summer camp

International Nathiagali Summer College on Physics (INSC)
- Established: June 1976
- Location: Nathia Gali, Hazara, Khyber-Paktunkhwa Province of Pakistan
- Jurisdiction: Government of Pakistan
- Director: Prof. Riazuddin, PhD
- Founding Director: Prof. Abdus Salam, Nobel laureate and NI
- Science Affiliations: National Centre for Physics (NCP); Pakistan Atomic Energy Commission (PAEC); International Centre for Theoretical Physics (ICTP)
- Government affiliation: Ministry of Science and Technology, GoPk.

The International Nathiagali Summer College on Physics and Contemporary Needs (INSC), was founded by Nobel laureate in Physics Dr. Abdus Salam (then-Science Advisor to the Prime minister) to promote physics and scientific research activities in Pakistan. Following Professor Abdus Salam to the Government of Pakistan, the college was established by Pakistan Atomic Energy Commission Chairman Munir Ahmad Khan.

An annual college-based summer camp, it is organized by the Pakistan Atomic Energy Commission and the National Center for Physics, and sponsored by the International Center for Theoretical Physics and Pakistan’s Minister of Science and Technology. A Physics research centre, it is located in Nathiagali city of Pakistan, and its current director is dr. Riazuddin, a pupil of professor Salam.

== History ==
Professor Abdus Salam wanted to establish an annual college that promoted global scientific activities. Munir Ahmad Khan strongly advocated for the program. In 1976, the first Summer college was established and 14 participants from all over the world had attended the college for the first time. George Deacon, Professors Roger Penrose, Benjamin Whiso Lee, Mujaddid Ahmed Ijaz, Remo Ruffini and others had attended the college.

== Research and program emphasis ==
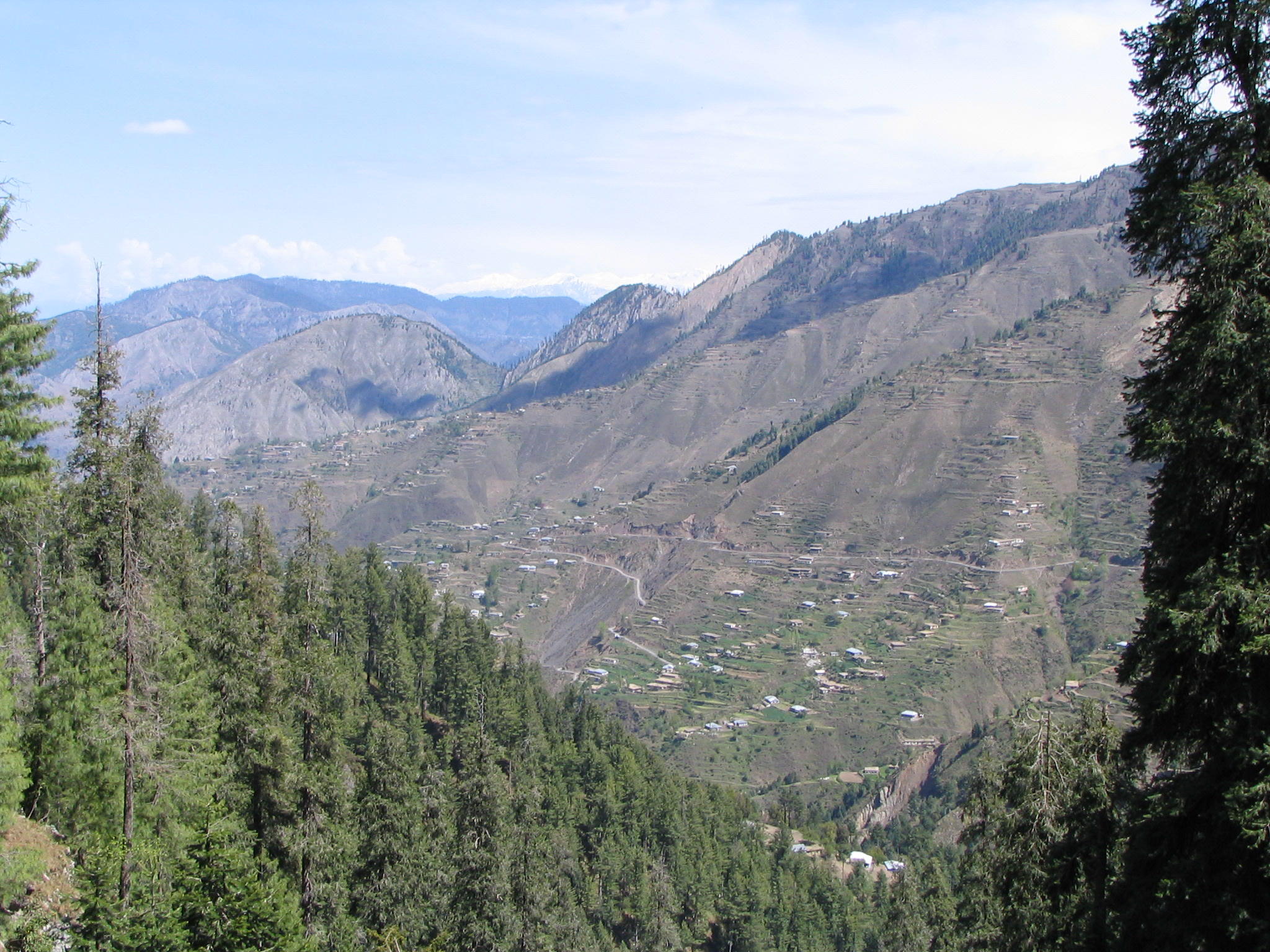
The INSC is located in Nathiagali, Pakistan.

Participants in the annual event are from all over the world. In 2010, approximately 6200 people had attended the college.
