= Munir Ahmad Khan =

Pakistani nuclear engineer (1926–1999)

- Born: 20 May 1926; Kasur, Punjab, British India (Present day in Punjab, Pakistan)
- Died: 22 April 1999 (aged 72); Vienna, Austria
- Citizenship: Pakistan
- Education: Government College University; University of Punjab; North Carolina State University
- Known for: Pakistan's nuclear deterrent program and nuclear fuel cycle
- Awards: Nishan-i-Imtiaz (2012); Hilal-i-Imtiaz (1989)
- Scientific career
- Fields: Nuclear Engineering
- Workplaces: Pakistan Atomic Energy Commission; International Atomic Energy Agency; Institute of Applied Sciences; University of Engineering and Technology; International Center for Theoretical Physics
- Thesis: Investigations on Model Surge Generator (1953)
- Academic advisors: Walter Zinn

Munir Ahmad Khan (Urdu: منير احمد خان; 20 May 1926 – 22 April 1999), NI, HI, FPAS, was a Pakistani nuclear engineer who is credited, among others, as the "father of the atomic bomb program" of Pakistan for his leading role in developing the nation's nuclear weapons.

From 1972 to 1991, Khan served as the chairman of the Pakistan Atomic Energy Commission (PAEC) who directed and oversaw the completion of the clandestine bomb program from its earliest efforts to develop the atomic weapons to their ultimate nuclear testings in May 1998. His early career was mostly spent in the International Atomic Energy Agency and he used his position to help establish the International Centre for Theoretical Physics in Italy and an annual conference on physics in Pakistan. As chair of PAEC, Khan's efforts focused on developing the Nuclear fuel cycle for production of Highly enriched uranium and weapon-grade plutonium, and building the Nuclear weapon design, development and testing program while promoting peaceful uses of the atom.

After retiring from the Atomic Energy Commission in 1991, Khan provided the public advocacy for nuclear power generation as a substitute for hydroelectricity consumption in Pakistan and briefly tenured as the visiting professor of physics at the Institute of Applied Sciences in Islamabad. Throughout his life, Khan was subjected to political ostracization due to his advocacy for averting nuclear proliferation and was rehabilitated when he was honored with the Nishan-i-Imtiaz (Order of Excellence) by the President of Pakistan in 2012— thirteen years after his death in 1999.

== Early life and education ==
Munir Ahmad Khan was born in Kasur, Punjab in the British India on 20 May 1926 into a Kakazai family that had long been settled in Lahore. After completing his matriculation in 1942 in Kasur, Khan enrolled at the Government College University in Lahore and was a contemporary of Abdus Salam— the Nobel Laureate in Physics in 1978. In 1946, Khan graduated with a Bachelor of Arts (BA) in physics and mathematics and enrolled at the Punjab University to study engineering in 1949.

In 1951, Khan graduated with a Bachelor of Science in Engineering (BSE) in electrical engineering and was noted for his academic standing when he was named to the Roll of Honor for his class of 1951. After graduation, Khan served on an engineering faculty of the University of Engineering and Technology (UET) in Lahore, and earned a Fulbright Scholarship to study engineering in the United States.

Under the Fulbright Scholarship program, Khan attended North Carolina State University to resume his graduate studies in electrical engineering and graduated with a Master of Science (MS) in electrical engineering in 1953. He was the first Pakistani M.S. graduate in electrical engineering from NC State. His master's thesis, titled: Investigation on Model Surge Generator contained fundamental work on applications of the impulse generator.

In 1953, Khan began his post-graduate research in the Department of Physics and Electrical Engineering at the Illinois Institute of Technology. In 1956, Khan left the Illinois Institute of Technology when he accepted to be a participant in the Atoms for Peace program of the United States and joined the International School of Nuclear Science and Engineering for post-graduate training in nuclear engineering offered by the North Carolina State University in cooperation with the Argonne National Laboratory in Illinois.

In 1957, Khan graduated from the Argonne National Laboratory, with strong emphasis on nuclear reactor physics and power reactors.

== Early professional work ==
$k = \eta f p \varepsilon P_{FNL} P_{TNL}$
The six-factor equations for determining the multiplication of a nuclear chain reaction in a non-infinite medium.

Khan began his professional experience with the leading U.S. engineering companies and nuclear laboratories that played key roles in the Manhattan Project during World War Two. He worked as a power plant engineer with the Allis-Chalmers Manufacturing Company in Milwaukee from 1952-1953 and later as a systems planning engineer with the Commonwealth Edison company in Chicago from 1954-1956. Allis-Chalmers was a large industrial utility that served as a sub-contractor and manufacturer of pumps and equipment for the K-25 gaseous diffusion plant at Oak Ridge, Tennessee and electromagnetic isotope separation plant for uranium enrichment in the Manhattan Project. The Commonwealth Edison Company in Chicago built the first commercial power reactor in the United States and was the largest operator of nuclear power plants in the country. Khan's engineering assignments with Allis Chalmers and Commonwealth Edison and research at the Illinois Institute of Technology turned his interest from electric to nuclear power in 1956 through the Atoms for Peace Program.

Upon graduation from the Argonne International School of Nuclear Science and Engineering, Munir Khan was appointed as a Resident Research Associate in Argonne National Laboratory's Nuclear Engineering Division in 1957 where he worked on design modifications of the Chicago Pile-5 (CP-5) reactor. He also gained operating experience on the ARGONAUT and Experimental Boiling Water Reactor (EBWR). The Argonne National Laboratory was operated by the University of Chicago for the U.S. Atomic Energy Commission where the first self-sustaining nuclear chain reaction took place in 1942. Khan then moved to the Atomics Department of American Machine and Foundry in 1957 where he worked on as a reactor design engineer on the Thermodynamic design of Japan Research Reactor-2 till 1958.

=== International Atomic Energy Agency (IAEA) ===
In 1958, Khan left the United States after accepting employment with the International Atomic Energy Agency (IAEA) in Austria, joining the nuclear power division at a senior technical position, and was noted as the first Asian person from any developing country to be appointed to a senior position there. During this time, Khan was taken as an advisor on energy issues by the Pakistan Atomic Energy Commission (PAEC) and represented his country at various energy-based conferences and seminars for nuclear power generation. At IAEA, Khan's work was mostly based on reactor technology and he worked on the application of nuclear reactor physics to the utilization factor of nuclear reactors, overseeing technical aspects of the nuclear reactors as well as conducting a geological survey for the construction of commercial nuclear power plants.

His work on nuclear reactor physics, specifically determining neutron transport and the interaction of neutrons within the reactor, was widely recognized and he was often known as "Reactor Khan" among his peers at the nuclear power division of the IAEA. Khan was also known to have gained expertise in producing isotopic reactor-grade plutonium, deriving it from neutron capture, that is frequently found alongside the uranium-235 (U^{235}) civilian reactors, in the form of low enriched uranium.

At IAEA, Khan organized more than 20 international technical and scientific conferences and seminars on the topics of constructing deuterium-based (heavy water) reactors, gas-cooled reactor systems, efficiency and performance of nuclear power plants, the fuel extraction of uranium, and production of plutonium. In 1961, he prepared a technical feasibility report on behalf of the IAEA on small nuclear power reactor projects of the United States Atomic Energy Commission.

In 1964 and 1971, Khan served as scientific secretary to the third and fourth United Nations International Geneva Conferences on the Peaceful Uses of Atomic Energy. Between 1986 and 1987, Khan also served as Chairman of the IAEA Board of Governors and headed Pakistan's delegations to IAEA General Conferences from 1972 to 1990. He served as a Member of the IAEA Board of Governors for 12 years.

=== International Centre for Theoretical Physics ===
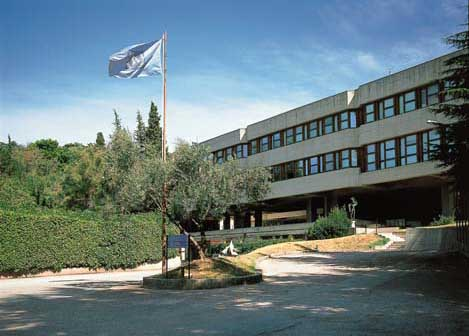
The ICTP building in Italy that was established from the lobbying of Khan on behalf of Salam at IAEA in 1964.

While studying at the Government College University in Lahore in the 1940s, Khan had acquainted with Abdus Salam and was supportive of Salam's efforts for his vision to put his country engaged towards scientific education and literacy as an adviser in the Ayub administration in the 1960s. While working at IAEA, Khan recognized the importance of Theoretical physics but was more interested in studying its "real world" applications that related to the field of physics of nuclear reaction in a confined nuclear reactor.

In September 1960, Salam confided Khan about establishing a research institute dedicated towards advancement of mathematical sciences under IAEA which Khan immediately supported the idea by lobbying at IAEA for financial funding and sponsorship– thus founding of the International Center for Theoretical Physics (ICTP). The idea mostly met with favorable views from the member countries of the United Nations's scientific committee though one of its influential member— Isidor Rabi from the United States— opposed the idea of establishment of ICTP. It was Khan who convinced Sigvard Eklund, Director of the International Atomic Energy Agency, to intervene in this matter that ultimately led to the establishment of the International Center for Theoretical Physics in Trieste in Italy. The IAEA eventually entrusted Khan to oversee the construction of the ICTP in 1967, and played an instrumental role in establishing the annual summer conference on science in 1976 on Salam's advice.

Even after his retirement from the PAEC, Khan remained concern with the physics education in his country, joining the faculty of the Institute of Engineering and Applied Sciences to instruct courses on physics in 1997— the university that he oversaw its academic programs in 1976 as Center for Nuclear Studies. In 1999, Khan was invited as a guest speaker at the opening ceremony of the National Center for Physics— the national laboratory site— that works in close proximity with the ICTP in Italy. In 1967, Khan and Salam had prepared a proposal for setting up a fuel cycle facility and plutonium reprocessing plant to address the energy consumption demand— the proposal was deferred by Ayub administration on economic grounds.

== Zulfikar Ali Bhutto's trusted aide ==
After his visit to the Bhabha Atomic Research Centre in Trombay as part of the IAEA inspection in 1964 and the second war with India in 1965, Khan became increasingly concerned about politics and international affairs. Eventually, Khan voiced his concerns to the Government of Pakistan when he met with Zulfikar Ali Bhutto (Foreign Minister in Ayub administration at that time) in Vienna about the possible acquisition of nuclear deterrent to address the nuclear threat from India.

On 11 December 1965, Bhutto arranged a meeting between Khan and President Ayub Khan at the Dorchester Hotel in London where Khan made unsuccessful attempt in try convincing the President to pursue nuclear deterrent despite pointing out cheap cost estimates for the acquiring the nuclear capability. At the meeting, President Ayub Khan downplayed the warnings and swiftly dismissed the offer while believing that Pakistan "was too poor to spend" so much money and ended the meeting saying that, if needed, Pakistan would "somehow buy it off the shelf". After the meeting, Khan met with Bhutto and informed him about meeting with Bhutto later quoting: "Don't worry. Our turn will come".

Throughout the 1970s and onwards, Khan was very sympathetic to Pakistan Peoples Party's political cause and President Bhutto had spoken highly of his services while promising to ensure federal funding of the national programs of nuclear weapons at the inauguration ceremony of Karachi Nuclear Power Plant– the first milestone towards the goal of making Pakistan a nuclear power on 28 November 1972. (Note: In 1978, Khan told them that the design process of the bomb was completed and Bhutto expected the nuclear test in August 1978. Khan then told Murtaza and Benazir that the tests were moved to December 1978, but delayed indefinitely due to political and diplomatic considerations of the country. Benazir Bhutto, however, continued her ties with Khan and awarded him the Hilal-i-Imtiaz in 1989 for his services to Pakistan's nuclear program in developing nuclear fuel cycle technology.) His left-wing association with the Peoples Party continue even after turnover of federal government by the Pakistani military in 1977 as Khan visited Bhutto various times in Adiala State Prison to inform him about the status of the program.

== Pakistan Atomic Energy Commission (PAEC) ==
In 1972, Khan officially resigned from his directorship of the IAEA's reactor division when he was appointed as chairman of the Pakistan Atomic Energy Commission, replacing I. H. Usmani who was appointed secretary at the Ministry of Science in the Bhutto administration. By March 1972, Khan submitted a detailed roadmap to the Ministry of Energy (MoE) that envisioned linking the country's entire energy infrastructure to nuclear power sources as a substitute for energy consumption dependent on hydroelectricity.

On 28 November 1972, Khan, together with Abdus Salam, accompanied President Bhutto to the inauguration ceremony for the Karachi Nuclear Power Plant (KANUPP)–the first milestone towards the goal of making Pakistan a nuclear power. Khan played a crucial role in keeping grid operations running for the Karachi Nuclear Power Plant after its chief scientist, Wazed Miah, had his security clearance revoked, and was forced to migrate to Bangladesh. Khan then established a training facility in cooperation with the Karachi University to fill the void created by Bengali engineers. When Canadian General Electric stopped the supply of uranium and machine components for the Karachi Nuclear Power Plant in 1976, Khan worked on developing the nuclear fuel cycle without foreign assistance to make sure that the plant kept generating power for the nation's electricity grid by establishing the fuel cycle facility near the power plant in cooperation with the Karachi University.

In 1975–76, Khan entered into diplomacy with France's Alternative Energies and Atomic Energy Commission (CEA) for acquiring a reprocessing plant for production of reactor-grade plutonium, and a commercial nuclear power plant in Chashma, advising the federal government on key matters regarding the operations of these plants. Negotiations with France over the reprocessing plant was extremely controversial at home with the United States later intervening in the matter between Pakistan and France over fears of nuclear proliferation. Khan's relations with the Bhutto administration often soured because Khan wanted to engage the CEA long enough until PAEC was able to learn to design and construct the plants itself, while Bhutto administration officials wanted the plants based solely on imports from France. In 1973–77, Khan entered in negotiation with CEA for Chashma Nuclear Power Plant, having advised the MoE to sign the IAEA safeguard agreement with France to ensure the foreign funding of the plant, which the PAEC was designing but the CEA left the project with PAEC taking control of the entire project despite Khan's urging to French CEA to fulfill its contractual obligations. With France's offing, Khan eventually negotiated with China over this project's foreign funding in 1985–86.

In 1977, Khan fiercely opposed the French CEA's proposal to alter the design of the reprocessing plant so that it would produce a mixed reactor-grade plutonium with natural uranium, which would stop the production of military-grade plutonium. Khan advised the federal government to refuse the modification plan as the PAEC had already build the plant itself and manufactured components from local industry— this plant was built by PAEC and is now known as Khushab Nuclear Complex.

In 1982, Khan expanded the scope of nuclear technology for harnessing the agriculture and food irradiation process by establishing the Nuclear Institute for Food and Agriculture (NIAB) in Peshawar while moving PAEC's scope towards medical physics research by securing federal funding for various cancer research hospitals in Pakistan in 1983–91.

=== 1971 war and atomic bomb project ===
"We were not just making the bomb, but building science and technology....

— Munir Khan describing the atomic bomb efforts,

On 16 December 1971, Pakistan ultimately called for a unilateral ceasefire to end their third war with India when the Yahya Khan administration acceded to the unconditional surrender of the Pakistani military on the eastern front of the war, resulting in the secession of East Pakistan as the independent country Bangladesh, from the Federation of Pakistan.

Upon learning the news, Khan returned to Pakistan from Austria, landing in Quetta to initially attend the winter session to meet with PAEC's scientists before being flown to Multan. This winter session, known as the "Multan meeting", was arranged by Abdus Salam for scientists to meet with President Bhutto who, on 20 January 1972, authorized the crash program to develop an atomic bomb for the sake of "national survival". President Bhutto invited Khan to take over the weapons program work—a task that Khan threw himself into with full vigor. In spite of having been unknown to many senior scientists, Khan busied himself on development of the program, initially assisting in complicated fast neutron calculations. Although Khan was not a doctorate holder, his extensive experience as a nuclear engineer at the reactor physics division at IAEA enabled him to direct senior scientists working under him on classified projects. In a short time, Khan impressed the conservatively-aligned Pakistani military with the breadth of his knowledge, and grasp of engineering, ordnance, metallurgy, chemistry, and interdisciplinary projects that would distinguish from the field of physics.

In December 1972, Abdus Salam directed two theoretical physicists, Riazuddin and Masud Ahmad, at the International Center for Theoretical Physics to report to Khan on their return to Pakistan where they formed the "Theoretical Physics Group" (TPG) in PAEC— this division eventually went to commit itself to perform tedious mathematical calculations on fast neutron temperatures. Salam, who saw this program as an opportunity to ensure federal government's interest and funding to promote scientific activities in his country, took over the TPG's directorship with Khan assisting in the solutions for fast neutron calculations and binding energy measurements of the atomic bomb.

The research operational scope of the Pakistan Institute of Nuclear Science and Technology, the national laboratory site, was well expanded from a school building to several buildings, which were erected in great haste, in Nilore. At this laboratory site, Khan assembled a large group of the top physicists of the time from the Quaid-e-Azam University, where he invited them to conduct classified research with federal funding rather than teaching the fields of physics in the university classrooms.

An Example of Implosion schema of a nuclear weapon, Fat Man, built by the United States in the 1940s.

In 1972, the earlier efforts were directed to a plutonium boosted fission implosion-type device whose design was codenamed: Kirana-I. In March 1974, Khan, together with Salam, held a meeting at the Institute of Nuclear Science and Technology with Hafeez Qureshi, a mechanical engineer with an expertise in radiation heat transfer, and Dr. Zaman Shaikh, a chemical engineer from the Defense Science and Technology Organization (DESTO). At that meeting, the word "bomb" was never used but it was understood the need for the development of explosive lenses, a sub-critical sphere of fissile material could be squeezed into a smaller and denser form, and the reflective tamper, the metal needed to scatter only very short distances, so the critical mass would be assembled in much less time. This project required manufacturing and machining of key parts that necessitated another laboratory site, leading Khan, assisted by Salam, to meet with Lieutenant-General Qamar Ali Mirza, Engineer-in-Chief of the Corps of Engineers. Ensuring the Corps would handle its part in the atomic bomb project, Khan requested the construction of the Metallurgical Laboratory (ML) near the Pakistan Ordnance Factories in Wah. Eventually, the project was relocated to the ML with Qureshi and Zaman moving their staff and machine shops from the Institute of Nuclear Science and Technology with assistance from the military.

In March 1974, Khan took over the work of TPG from Salam when Salam left the country in protest over a constitutional amendment, with Riazuddin leading the studies. During this time, Khan launched a uranium enrichment program which was seen as a backup for fissile material production, delegating this project to Bashiruddin Mahmood who focused on gaseous diffusion and Shaukat Hameed Khan, who pioneered the laser isotope separation method. The uranium enrichment project accelerated when India announced "Smiling Buddha", a surprise weapons test, with Khan confirming the test's radiation emission through data provided by I. H. Qureshi on 18 May 1974. Sensing the importance of this test, Khan called a meeting between Hameed Khan and Mahmood who analyzed different methods but finally agreed on gaseous diffusion over laser isotope separation, that continued at its own pace under Hameed Khan in October 1974. In 1975, Khalil Qureshi, a physical chemist, was asked to join the uranium project under Mehmood who did most of the calculations on military-grade uranium. In 1976, Dr. Abdul Qadeer Khan, a nuclear metallurgist, joined the program but was given the task of developing nuclear capability due to his indepth knwowldge of advance nuclear technology, that led to the program being moved to the independent self-sufficient Khan Research Laboratories in Kahuta with A. Q. Khan being its chief scientist under the Corps of Engineers.

By 1976–77, the entire atomic bomb program was quickly transferred from the civilian Ministry of Science, to military control with Khan, as chief scientist, remaining the technical director of the overall bomb program.

=== Nuclear tests: Chagai-II ===
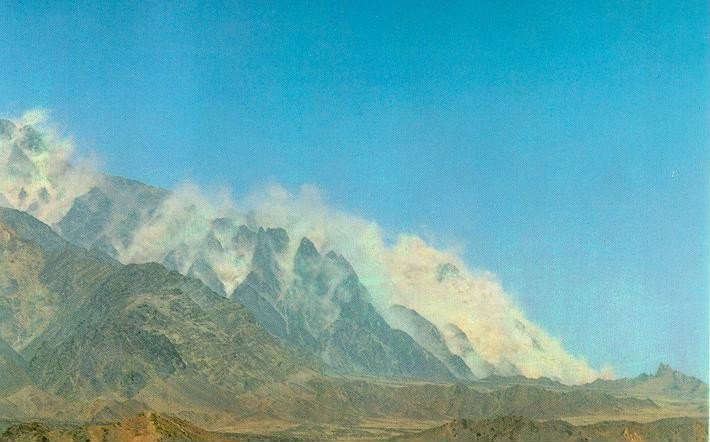
The nuclear weapons test, codename Chagai-I, conducted at the rocky granite mountain in May 1998. The testing site for the detonation was selected, and then built around 1977–78.

In 1975, AQ Khan, in discussion with the Corps of Engineers, had selected the mountain ranges in Balochistan for the isolation needed to maintain security and secrecy. He tasked Ishfaq Ahmad and Ahsan Mubarak, a seismologist, to conduct a geological survey of mountain ranges with help from the Corps of Engineers and Geological Survey of Pakistan. Scouting for a test site in 1976, the team searched for a high altitude and rocky granite mountain that would be suitable to take more than ~40 kn of nuclear blast yield, ultimately candidating the remote, isolated, and unpopulated ranges at Chagai, Kala-Chitta, Kharan, and Kirana in 1977–78.

The joint work of the various groups at the Institute of Nuclear Science and Technology led to the first cold-test of their atomic bomb design on 11 March 1983, codenamed: Kirana-I. A "cold test" is a subcritical test of a nuclear weapon design without the fissile material inserted to prevent any nuclear fission. Preparations for the tests and engineering calculations were validated by Khan with Ahmad leading the team of scientists; other invitees to witness the test included Ghulam Ishaq Khan, Major-General Michael O'Brian from the Pakistan Air Force (PAF), General K. M. Arif, Chief of Army Staff at that time, and other senior military officers.

Khan recalled to his biographer, decades later, that while witnessing the test:

In 1977–80, the PAEC completed the designs of the iron-steel tunnels in Chagai region. On 11 March 1983, we successfully conducted [our] (cold) test of a working design of atomic bomb. That evening, AQ Khan went to President Zia with the news that Pakistan was now ready to make an atomic bomb. We conducted this cold test long before the fissile material was available for actual test. We were ahead of others.....

— Munir Ahmad Khan,Statement given to news media in 1999.

Despite many difficulties and political opposition, Khan lobbied and emphasized the importance of plutonium and countered scientific opposition led by fellow scientist Abdul Qadeer Khan, who opposed the plutonium route, favoring the uranium atomic bomb. From the start, studies were concentrated towards feasibility of the plutonium "implosion-type" design, a device known as the Chagai-II in 1998. Khan, together with Abdul Qadeer, worked on his proposal for viability of "gun-type" designs— a simpler mechanism that only had to work with U^{235}, but there was a possibility for that weapon's chain reaction to be a "nuclear fizzle", therefore they abandoned gun-type studies in favor of the implosion-type. Khan's advocacy for the plutonium implosion-type design was validated with the test of a plutonium device that was called Chagai-II to artificially produce nuclear fission— this nuclear device had the largest yield of all the boosted fission uranium devices.

President Zia, despite Khan's political orientation, widely respected Khan for his knowledge and understanding of national security issues when he spoke highly of him during a visit to the Institute of Nuclear Science and Technology in November 1986:

It has been a matter of great pride and satisfaction to see what all is going on in (Pakistan) Atomic Energy Commission (PAEC). It was heartening to see the progress that has taken place..... I congratulate Munir and his associates for all that they have done.... The People of Pakistan are proud of their achievements and pray for their success in the future.

=== Arms race and diplomacy with India ===
Despite the issuance of public statements by Pakistani politicians, the atomic bomb program was, nonetheless, kept top secret from their public and Khan became a national spokesman for science in the federal government with a new type of technocratic role. He lobbied for independence of the Space Research Commission from the PAEC and provided narrative for launching the nation's first satellite to meet and compete with India in the space race in Asia. Unlike his predecessor, Khan advocated for an arms race with India to ensure the balance of power by securing funding for military "black" projects and national security programs. By 1979, Khan removed PAEC's role in defense production moving the Wah Group, that designed the tactical nuclear weapons in 1986, from ML to KRL, and also founded the National Defence Complex (NDC) in 1991.

At various international conferences, Khan was very critical of the Indian nuclear program as he perceived that it had military purposes, and viewed it as a threat to the region's stability, while he defended Pakistan's non-nuclear weapon policy as well as their nuclear tests when he summed up his thoughts:

In 1972, we (Pakistan) made a [nuclear policy] statement... that [Pakistan] wanted a nuclear-free zone in South Asia (so) that the resources in the sub-continent could be focused on solving problems of poverty and deprivation of [one] billion people in this region of the world. But India did not listen to us (Pakistan).... Now that we have responded to India's nuclear aggression, Pakistan hope that they will listen to us ...

— Munir Ahmad Khan,stating his views on Operation Shakti in 1999,

When Israel's Operation Opera surprise airstrike destroyed the Osirak Nuclear Plant in Iraq in 1981, the Pakistani intelligence community learned of the Indian plans to attack Pakistan's national laboratory sites. Khan was confided in by diplomat Abdul Sattar over this intelligence report in 1983. While attending a conference on nuclear safety in Austria, Khan became acquainted with Indian physicist Raja Ramanna when discussing topics in nuclear physics, briefly inviting the latter for a dinner at the Imperial Hotel where Ramanna confirmed the veracity of the information.

At this dinner, Khan reportedly warned Ramanna about a possible retaliatory nuclear strike at Trombay if the Indian plans were to go ahead and urged Ramanna to relay this message to Indira Gandhi, the Indian Prime Minister at that time. The message was delivered to the Indian Prime Minister's Office, and the Non-Nuclear Aggression Agreement treaty was signed to prevent nuclear accidents and accidental detonations between India and Pakistan in 1987.

=== Government work, academia and advocacy ===
In the 1980s, Khan emblemed in the federal government with a new type of technocratic role, a science adviser, becoming the spokesman of national science policy and advised the federal government to sign an agreement to ensure federal funding from China to commission the Chashma Nuclear Power Plant in 1987. In 1990, Khan advised the Benazir's administration to entered in negotiation with France over construction of nuclear power plant in Chashma.

As chairing the PAEC in 1972, Khan played a crucial role in expanding the "Reactor School" which was housed in a lecture room located at the Institute of Nuclear Science and Technology in Nilore and had only one faculty member, Dr. Inam-ur-Rehman, who often traveled to the United States to teach engineering at the Mississippi State University. In 1976, Khan moved the Reactor School in Islamabad, renaming it as "Centre for Nuclear Studies (CNS)" and took the professorship in physics, as an unpaid part-time employment, alongside Dr. Inam-ur-Rehman.

After his retirement from PAEC in 1991, Khan went to academia when he joined the faculty at the center for nuclear studies as a full-time professor to teach courses on physics while continuing to push for the CNS to be granted as university by the Higher Education Commission. In 1997, his dream was fulfilled when the federal government accepted his recommendation by granting the status of center for nuclear studies as a public university and renaming it as the Institute of Engineering and Applied Sciences (PIEAS).

== Final years ==
=== Death and legacy ===
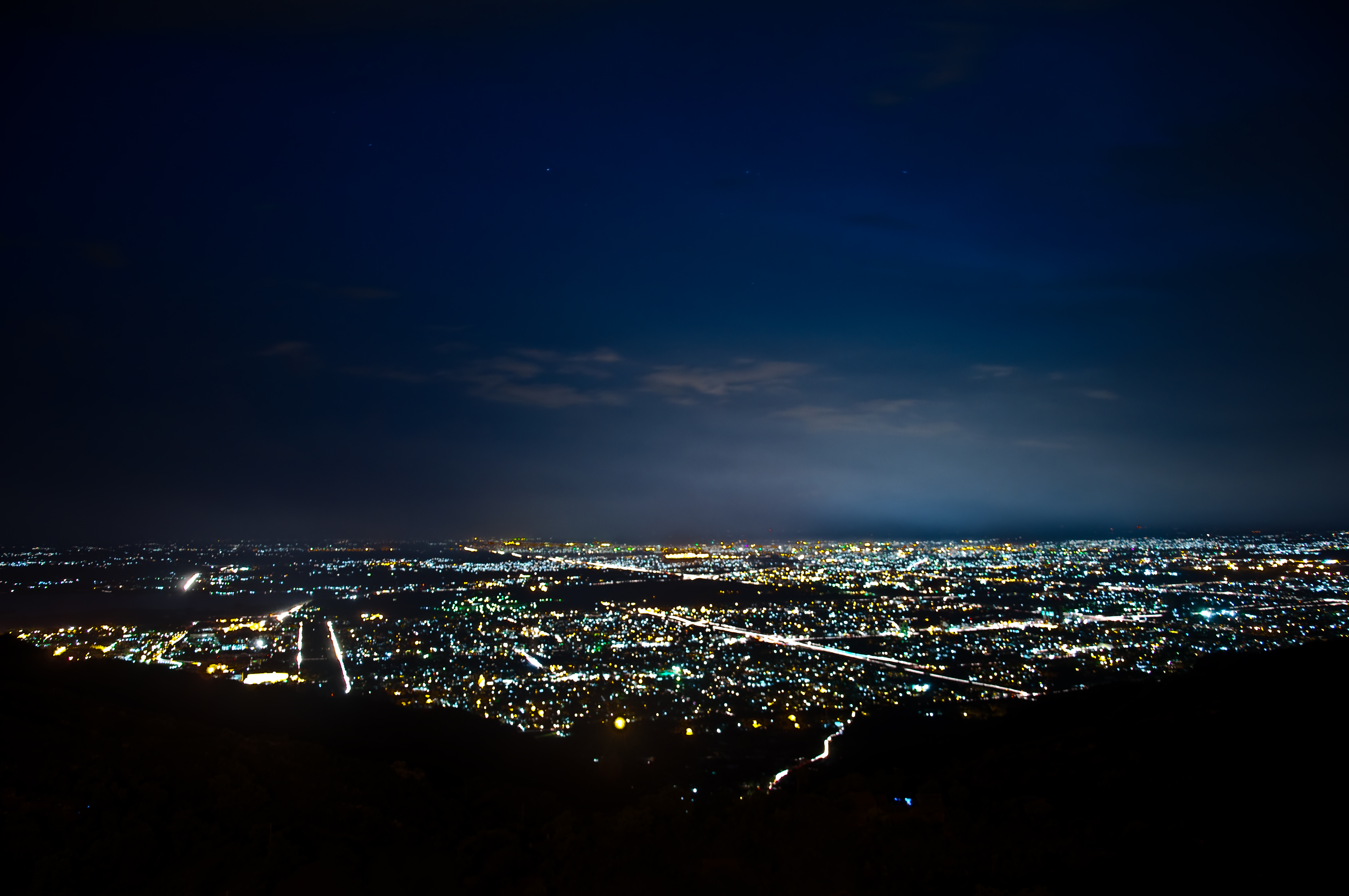
The city skyline of Islamabad where Khan resided during his final years.

In 1972, Khan bought an estate in Islamabad and then died following complications from heart surgery, aged 72, on 22 April 1999. He is survived by his wife, Thera, three children and four grandchildren.

When Abdus Salam was ejected from his position in 1974, Khan symbolized of many scientists thinking they could control how other peers would use their research. During the timeline of atomic bomb program, Khan was seen as a symbol of both moral responsibility of scientists, and to the contribution to the rise of Pakistan's science while preventing the politicization of the project. Popular depiction of Khan's views on nuclear proliferation as a confrontation between right-wing militarists who viewed that security interests with Western world incompatible (symbolized by Abdul Qadeer Khan) and left-wing intellectuals who viewed maintaining alliances with Western world (symbolized by Munir Khan) over the moral question of weapons of mass destruction.

In the 1990s, Khan was increasingly concerned about the potential danger that scientific inventions in nuclear applications could pose to humanity and stressed the difficulty of managing the power of scientific knowledge between scientists and lawmakers in an atmosphere in which the exchange of scientific ideas was hobbled by political concerns. During his time working in atomic bomb program, Khan was obsessed with secrecy and refused to meet with many journalists while he encouraged several scientists working on the classified projects to stay away from televised press and public due to the sensitivity of their job.

As a scientist, Khan is remembered by his peers as brilliant researcher and engaging teacher, the founder of applied physics in Pakistan. In 2007, Farhatullah Babar portrayed Khan as "tragic fate but consciously genius". After years of urging of many of Khan's colleagues in PAEC and his powerful political friends who had ascended to power in the government, President Asif Ali Zardari bestowed and honored Khan with the prestigious and highest civilian state award, Nishan-e-Imtiaz in 2012 as a gesture of political rehabilitation.

One of Khan's achievements is his technical leadership of the atomic bomb program, roughly modelled on the Manhattan Project that prevented the exploitation and politicization of the program in the hands of politicians, lawmakers, and military officials. The national project under Khan's technical directorship focused on developing his nation's atomic weapons and a diversified the nuclear technology for medical usage while he regarded this clandestine atomic bomb project as "building science and technology for Pakistan".

As military and public policy maker, Khan was a technocrat leader in a shift between science and military, and the emergence of the concept of the big science in Pakistan. During the Cold war, scientists became involved in military research on unprecedented degree, because of the threat communism from Afghanistan and Indian integration posed to Pakistan, scientists volunteered in great numbers both for technological and organizational assistance to Pakistan's efforts that resulted in powerful tools such as laser science, the proximity fuse and operations research. As a cultured and intellectual physicist who became a disciplined military organizer, Khan represented the shift away from the idea that scientists had their "head in the clouds" and that knowledge on such previously esoteric subjects as the composition of the atomic nucleus had no "real-world" applications.

Throughout his life, Khan was honored with his nation's awards and honors:

- Nishan-e-Imtiaz (2012; Posthumous)
- Hilal-e-Imtiaz (1989)
- Gold medal, PAS (1992)
- Fulbright Award (1951)
- Roll of Honor, GCU (1946)
- Fellowship, Pakistan Nuclear Society (1999)
- Fellowship, American Nuclear Society (1999)
- Fellowship, Pakistan Institute of Electrical Engineers (1992)
- Fellowship, Sigma Xi Society (1953–1956)
- Fellowship Rotary International (1951)

== Quotes by Khan ==
- "We have to understand that nuclear weapons are not a play thing to be bandied publicly. They have to be treated with respect and responsibility. While they can destroy the enemy, they can also invite self destruction."
- "While we were building capabilities in the nuclear fuel cycle, we started in parallel the design of a nuclear device, with its trigger mechanism, physics calculations, production of metal, making precision mechanical components, high-speed electronics, diagnostics, and testing facilities. For each one of them, we established different laboratories".
- "Many sources were tapped after the decision to go nuclear. We were simultaneously working on 20 labs and projects under the administrative control of PAEC, every one the size of Khan Research Laboratories."
- "On 11 March 1983, we successfully conducted the first cold test of a working nuclear device. That evening, I went to General Zia with the news that Pakistan was now ready to make a nuclear device."

Government offices
Preceded by MGen Zahid A. Akbar	Science Advisor to the Prime minister Secretariat; 5 July 1977 – 1 August 1993	Succeeded by Javaid Laghari
