= Pakistan Atomic Research Reactor =

Pair of research nuclear reactors in Nilore, Islamabad, Pakistan

- Location within Pakistan
- Operating institution: Pakistan Institute of Nuclear Science and Technology
- Location: Nilore, Islamabad, Pakistan
- Coordinates: 33°39′13″N 73°15′30″E
- Type: MTR (PARR-I); MNSR (PARR-II); SPR (PARR-III)

Construction and upkeep
- Construction cost: PARR-I; US$600,000 ($6.13 million in 2025)
- Time to construct: 6-months (PARR-I); 4-years (PARR-II); 2024-Present (PARR-III)

The Pakistan Atomic Research Reactor or (PARR) are two nuclear research reactors and two other experimental neutron sources located in the PINSTECH Laboratory, Nilore, Islamabad, Pakistan.

In addition a reprocessing facility referred to as New Labs also exists for nuclear weapon research and production.

The first nuclear reactor was supplied and financially constructed by the Government of United States of America in the mid 1960s. The other reactor and reprocessing facility are built and supplied by Pakistan Atomic Energy Commission (PAEC) in the 1970s and 1980s, respectively. Supervised by the United States and International Atomic Energy Agency (IAEA), the first two reactors are subject to IAEA safeguards and its inspections.

== History ==
The acquisition of the PARR-I was culminated from a tense negotiation between the Pakistan Atomic Energy Commission and the Planning Commission. The United States Atomic Energy Commission had earlier offered the CP-5 research reactor at the Argonne National Laboratory (ANL) at the price tag of 1 million USD ($10.2 million in 2025) but the matter was shelved due funding issues. The PAEC then showed interest in acquiring the Canadian NRX installed at the Chalk River Laboratories which was priced at 7 million USD ($71.5 million in 2025) but the Planning Commission deferred this initiative by prioritizing the funding to build the Warsak Dam– hydroelectric power dam in Khyber-Pakhtunkhwa, Pakistan.

In 1959, the Pakistan Atomic Energy Commission (PAEC) decided to submit its own design for the swimming–pool reactor and was budgeted to be at US$600,000 ($6.13 million in 2025) of Pakistani taxpayers, which was approved for the funding and paved away for establishing the Pakistan Atomic Research Reactor (PARR). Direct negotiation took place between the governments of Pakistan and the United States under the Atoms for Peace program and the contract was awarded to the American Machine and Foundry (AMF) as reactor supplier with Peter Karter its design engineer.

In 2009, the PARR-I became a focal point of controversy between the Obama administration and the Gillani administration when United States attempted to recover vintage PARR-I reactor and the HEU bundles that it shipped to Pakistan under the IAEA oversight. Though the PARR-I and its HEU bundles remained in Pakistan under IAEA, the Obama administration recovery attempts reportedly harmed the United States relations with Pakistan.

== PARR Reactors ==
=== PARR-I ===
PARR-I
- Generation: I
- Reactor concept: Materials Test
- Reactor line: PARR
- Status: Active

Main parameters of the reactor core
- Fuel (fissile material): U^{235} LEU
- Fuel state: U_{3}Si_{2}–Al
- Neutron energy spectrum: Thermal
- Primary control method: 8 intermetallic rods (Ag (80%), In (15%), Cd (5%))
- Primary moderator: Graphite
- Neutron reflector: Be^{4}
- Primary coolant: Light water Swimming pool

Reactor usage
- Primary use: Power reactor research, radioisotope production
- Power (thermal): 5 megawatts (0.0050 GW)
- Power (electric): 0.15 megawatts-hour
- Max thermal flux: 1.05E+13 n/cm^{2-s}
- Max fast flux: 1.70E+14 n/cm^{2-s}
- Criticality (date): 21 December 1965; 60 years ago
- Operator/owner: PAEC

The PARR-I is a materials testing-type research reactor that was purchased and obtained under the United States' Atoms for Peace program. The American Machine and Foundry (AMF) built the reactor site with Peter Karter who served its reactor design engineer.

Originally from the AMF and Karter's design, the PARR-I used highly-enriched uranium (HEU) as its fuel bundle that was imported from the United States with a power output limited and designed at 5 megawatts (0.0050 GW) (thermal). Light water in a swimming pool setting is used as a coolant source and acts as a means of radiation shielding while the Graphite, in thermal square column geometry, is used as moderator. The Beryllium is used as a primary reflector in the PARR-I reactor core.

The PARR-I core lattice has 54 circular 9×6 array with 81-mm x 77.11-mm latice spacing and containing the 79.63-mm x 75.92-mm physical standard fuel elements (SFEs), which are also the identical dimensions for the control fuel elements (CFEs) with the intermetallic silver rods, which is composed of the 80% of Ag, 15% of In, and 5% of Cd. The standard fuel element is sandwiched between the aluminium cladding of 0.38-mm thickness.

On December 21, 1965, the PARR-I went into critical under the supervision of team of physicists led by Naeem Ahmad Khan, and attained full power on 22 June 1966. With HEU core, the PARR-I operated at 30,000-hours (3-years) produced about 93,000 megawatts (93 GW) of energy.

The PARR-I is a source of producing plutonium and has been used in research to understand the science of tritium, solid-state physics, fission studies, and neutron diffraction investigations.

In 1990, the PARR-I was shut down for engineering modifications that converted the PARR-I from its original design to increase its power output to 10 megawatts (0.010 GW) (thermal), which is three-times less than the megawatt (electric), but this modification had to scaled down on the HEU fuel and now uses the low-enriched uranium (LEU) as its fuel bundle which is locally produced, thus ending the concerns of nuclear proliferation and the dependence on the imports.

The increased power output, however, led to the higher burn-up rates and produces only 100 grams (0.22 lb) of plutonium, which is insufficient for an amount for fissile material (weapons-grade plutonium).

The PARR-I went critical with < 20% LEU fuel on 31 October 1991, and attained power 10 megawatts (0.010 GW) (thermal) on 7 May 1992. With an LEU core, the PARR-I has operated at 10,000-hours (1-year) produced about 66,000 megawatts (66 GW) of energy, according to the technical data provided in 1995 to the IAEA. The core configuration attained its equilibrium configuration in February 1995.

The PARR-I is still and also utilized for irradiation of fissile HEU Targets to produce the Mo_{99} radioisotopes for cancer research.

The Pakistan Nuclear Regulatory Authority (PNRA) regularly inspects the reactor and reports it to the International Atomic Energy Agency (IAEA) as part of the agreement with the United States. The PARR-I has a design life and its operating license is valid up to 1 December 2031.

Pakistan Atomic Research Reactor‑I has been used for the training of scientists and engineers in Pakistan. Its role was recognized during a “Golden Jubilee Conference” held in honor of the reactor in 2015.

=== PARR-II ===
PARR-II
- Generation: I
- Reactor concept: Miniature Neutron Source
- Reactor line: PARR
- Status: Active

Main parameters of the reactor core
- Fuel (fissile material): U^{235} HEU
- Fuel state: UAl_{4}
- Neutron energy spectrum: Thermal
- Primary control method: 1 Cd
- Primary moderator: Light water
- Neutron reflector: Be^{4}
- Primary coolant: Light water Swimming pool

Reactor usage
- Primary use: Power reactor research
- Power (thermal): 30 kilowatts (0.030 MW)
- Power (electric): 879 kilowatt-hours
- Max thermal flux: 1.00E+12 n/cm^{2-s}
- Max fast flux: 5.00E+11 n/cm^{2-s}
- Criticality (date): 2 November 1989; 36 years ago
- Operator/owner: PAEC

The PARR-II is a miniature neutron source-type reactor that is based mostly on the Chinese design with Pakistani engineering and research modifications. The PARR-II is used for primarily used for neutron activation analysis as well as providing training and teaching on reactor power operations. The China Institute of Atomic Energy contributed in building the reactor under the International Atomic Energy Agency (IAEA) guidelines.

Originally, the Pakistan Atomic Energy Commission's concept and design was based on the Canadian SLOWPOKE reactor design for neutron activation studies and has been safely in operations since 1974. Under the IAEA oversight, China joined the project to help expand its operational capabilities, which is now mostly based on the miniature neutron source.

With a maximum thermal neutron flux of 1.00E+12 n/cm^{2-s}, the PARR-II is a small reactor and limited at power output of 30 kilowatts (0.030 MW) (thermal) presently. In past, the reactor was reportedly rated at 27 kilowatts (0.027 MW) and reached maximum power output of 76 kilowatts (0.076 MW) (thermal). Light water in tank-in-pool configuration is used as a coolant source. This demineralized light water is also primary moderator for PARR-II. Unlike the PARR-I, the PARR-II is located underground with reinforced concrete ceiling located above which serves as the radiation shielding. The Beryllium is a primary reflector in the PARR-II core.

The reactor core of the PARR-II is under-moderated array with hydrogen–to-uranium-235 atomic ratio of about 193.7 and the loading of the 991 grams of uranium-235 is uniformly distributed in 344 fuel pins. The fuel pins are 5.5-mm in diameter with 250-mm length. The PAR-II is fueled with highly-enriched uranium (HEU) pins, which are > 90% enriched in uranium-235. The fuel state is uranium aluminide (UAL_{4}) wrapped with the aluminum claddding (Al-303-1). Only one control rod, which is made up of cadmium, is used to prevent the reactor core meltdown due to self-limiting power characteristics featured in the PARR-II.

The PARR-II is primarily used for understanding and advancing the detector studies in temperature scaling, radiation transport pheonomenon, and neutron activation analysis. Although, the PARR-II has been operationalized and operated by the Atomic Energy Commission since 1974., the reactor actually reported to be critical on 2 November 1989 to the IAEA.

The Pakistan Nuclear Regulatory Authority (PNRA) regularly inspects the reactor and reports it to the International Atomic Energy Agency (IAEA) as part of the agreement with China. The PARR-II has a design life and its operating license is valid up to 1 December 2034.

=== PARR-III ===
The PARR-III is a swimming pool-type research reactor that is currently in under construction since 2024. It is rated at power output at 10 megawatts (0.010 GW) (thermal). Not much has been publicized but it expected to be completed in 3-years project lifetime.

== New Labs ==
Unlike the PARR-I and PARR-II the New Labs is not subject to IAEA inspections. and is completely different from its parent reactors. It is a plutonium-fuel reprocessing plant and works as a pilot ^{94}Pu reprocessing facility with a capability to use the ~7% ^{239}Pu, to handle the isotopes and use the ^{86}Kr emissions and radiation. It is also a reprocessing plant to change <~7% ^{239}Pu into <~7% weapon-grade ^{240}Pu fuel. New Labs were designed and constructed indigenously by Pakistan Atomic Energy Commission (PAEC) under its chairman Munir Ahmad Khan whereas it project-director was a mechanical engineer, Chaudhry Abdul Majeed. The construction of the facility was led by NESPAK.

The plant was completed in 1981 and cold reprocessing tests for producing plutonium took place at New Labs in 1986. The New Labs came into limelight when Pakistan had secretly tested its plutonium weapon-based nuclear device in Kirana Hills.

== Fast-Neutron Generator ==
In 1961, the United States Government led the establishment of ICF-based Fusion power experimental source near at Nilore, before the establishment of PINSTECH Institute. The neutron generator was bought by the PAEC from Texas A&M Nuclear Science Center. The facility is capable of producing mono-energetic neutrons at 3.5–14.7 MeV from deuterium-tritium fusion reaction. This fusion experimental devices has capability to capture the low neutron flux on the order of 10^{5} to 10^{8} neutrons per cm^{2} per second, resulting in nucleosynthesis by the s-process (slow-neutron-capture-process). It is designed and planned to do fast neutron activation for elements such as oxygen and nitrogen as well as some rare earth isotopes.
