= Department of Physics, Quaid-e-Azam University =

The Department of Physics, Quaid-e-Azam University (Urdu: طبیعیات کے سیکشن جامعہ قائداعظم) (founded as the Institute of Physics, QAU), is an academic and research department of the Quaid-e-Azam University (Qau), Pakistan. It is also referred to as the Institute of Theoretical Physics. In 2018, it was officially renamed as al-Khazini Department, named after al-Khazini.

Established in 1966 with efforts led by Abdus Salam, the institute was located in Rawalpindi, Punjab Province and offered research in mathematics and theoretical physics. Professor Riazuddin served its first and founding director of the institute after shifting to the present QAU campus in 1972. The institute is considered a birthplace of school of theoretical physics of Pakistan. It is also a birthplace of "Theoretical Physics Group" (TPG), now shifted to PINSTECH, and invited scientists from all over the world. The department has collaborated with institutes including Kahuta Research Laboratories, National Centre for Physics, Government College University, the International Centre for Theoretical Physics (ICTP) and CERN.

== Foundation and history ==
${ i\hbar\frac{\partial}{\partial t} \Psi(\mathbf{r},\,t) = \hat H \Psi(\mathbf{r},\,t)}$ The Schrödinger equation, use to describe how the quantum state of a physical system changes with time

Between 1966 and 1968, Abdus Salam's doctoral students had returned to Pakistan after earning their doctorates and experience. These physicists had been under Abdus Salam's influence and were eager to establish an institute of physics. Abdus Salam enabled them to engage their research in theoretical physics and to establish the country's first school of theoretical physics. Abdus Salam provided his support to establish the institute and gave the founding directorship of the institute to his pupil student, Riazuddin.

Abdus Salam and Riazuddin founded the first "Theoretical Physics Group (TPG)" in 1968 that gave birth to Pakistan's school of theoretical physics. The infrastructure was built by the Pakistan Atomic Energy Commission (PAEC) after Raziuddin Siddiqui also persuaded the PAEC to provide its full support to establish this institute as a birthplace of theoretical physics. The new institute was re-established at the University of Islamabad and, Salam, Siddiqui and Bhutto convinced the authorities in Pakistan, specifically President Ayub Khan, to make the proposed university a research institution. Siddiqui convinced the chairman of PAEC, dr IH Usmani, to send all the theoreticians in PAEC to the Institute of Physics at the University of Islamabad to form a theoretical physics group.
