= Takashi Mukaibo =

Japanese chemist (1917–2002)

- Born: March 24, 1917; Dalian, Kwantung
- Died: July 4, 2002 (aged 85); Shinjuku, Tokyo
- Citizenship: Japanese
- Education: Imperial University of Tokyo
- Spouse: Nobuko Mukaibo
- Scientific career
- Fields: Chemistry and nuclear engineering

Takashi Mukaibo (向坊 隆, Mukaibō Takashi; 24 March 1917 – 4 July 2002) was a Japanese chemist and nuclear engineer.

Appointed as the first science attaché at the Embassy of Japan in Washington D.C. in 1954, Mukaibo played a significant role in coordinating the atomic energy agreement with the United States.

After returning to Japan, he became dean of the School of Engineering of the University of Tokyo. He served as the university's president from 1977 to 1981.

Mukaibo is considered a pioneer in the field of use of nuclear energy in Japan. He promoted nuclear power generation for his entire career and served as chairman of the Japan Atomic Industrial Forum from 1992 to 2000.
