= Pakistan Institute of Nuclear Science & Technology =

Research and development complex in Nilore, Islamabad.

- Nickname: PINSTECH
- Established: 21 December 1965; 60 years ago
- Research type: Nuclear and basic science
- Location: Nilore, Islamabad, Pakistan
- Campus: 1 square mile (2.6 km^{2})
- Affiliations: PIEAS • IAEA
- Operating agency: Pakistan Atomic Energy Commission on behalf of the National Command Authority
- Website: pinstech.com.pk

The Pakistan Institute of Nuclear Science & Technology (PINSTECH) is a federally funded scientific research and development complex in Nilore, Islamabad, Pakistan.

The site was designed by the American architect Edward Durell Stone, and its construction was completed in 1965. It has been described as "[maybe] the most architecturally stunning physics complex in the world".

In response to the war with India in 1971, the lab was repurposed as a primary weapons laboratory from its original civilian mission. Since the 1990s, the lab has been focused increasingly on its civilian mission, and it maintains a broad portfolio in providing research opportunities in supercomputing, renewable energy, physical sciences, philosophy, materials science, medicine, environmental science, and mathematics.

== Overview ==
The Pakistan Institute of Nuclear Science & Technology (PINSTECH) is one of nation's leading research and development Institution affiliated to the national security. It is a principle national laboratory that has the responsibility by ensuring the safety, security, and reliability of nation's nuclear weapons program by advancing applications in science and technology.

The PINSTECH is located in Nilore, about 15 mi (24 km) southeast of Islamabad, and was designed by the American firm, AMF Atomics and Edward Durell Stone who once worded: "This....has been my greatest work. I am proud that it looks like it belongs in this country."

Since owned by the Government of Pakistan, its managed by Pakistan Atomic Energy Commission. The scientific research programs are supported at the laboratory through the Pakistan Institute of Engineering and Applied Sciences, also in Nilore. The laboratory covers around 400 acres (1.6 km^{2}) area.

== History ==
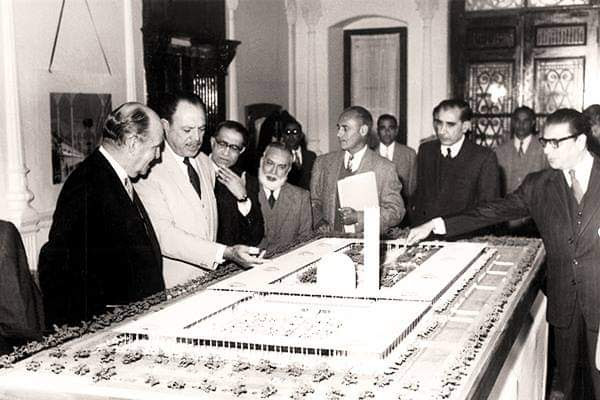
Edward Stone presents the Pakistan Institute of Nuclear Science & Technology (PINSTECH) model to President Ayub Khan in 1961.

The establishment of the Pakistan Institute of Nuclear Science & Technology (Pinstech) was embodiment of the Atoms for Peace initiative in 1953 and a long-sought initiative led by Abdus Salam who was lobbying for a professional physical laboratory since 1951. Budget constraints and lack of interests by the government administration had left a deep impression on Salam who was determined to establish to create an institution to which scientists from the developing countries would come as a right to interact with their peers from industrially advanced countries without permanently leaving their own countries. Construction of the Pinstech began when Salam who was able to find funding from the United States in 1961.

Eventually, Salam and I. H. Usmani approached Glenn T. Seaborg for the further funding of the laboratory from the United States government, which stipulated the fund if the Pakistan Atomic Energy Commission were to set up a research reactor of their own at sum of US$ 350,000. Contrary to United States' financial pledges, it was reported that the actual cost of building the Pinstech was neared at US$6.6 million ($67.4 million in 2025) that was funded and paid by the Pakistani taxpayers in 1965.

From 1965 to 1969, the Pinstech had an active and direct laboratory-to-laboratory interaction with the American national laboratories such as Oak Ridge, Argonne, Livermore, and Sandia.

The scientific library of the institute consisted of a large section containing historical references and literatures on the Manhattan Project, brought by Abdus Salam in 1971 prior to start of the nuclear weapons program under Zulfikar Ali Bhutto's administration.

The Pakistan Atomic Energy Commission (PAEC) hired the laboratory's first director Rafi Muhammad, a professor of physics at the Government College University, Lahore (GCU), who affiliated the Pinstech with the Quaid-i-Azam University in 1967, bearing some special materials testing. Soon, the scientists from Institute of Theoretical Physics of the Quaid-i-Azam University had an opportunity to seek permanent research employment in physics at the laboratory.

== Major Projects ==
=== Strategic deterrence ===
After the costly war with India in 1971, the re-purposing of the Pinstech Laboratory was difficult since it was never intended to be a nuclear physics or weapons laboratory. Initially, the plutonium pit production at Pinstech was quite difficult together with its tiny research reactor that could never be a source of weapons-grade plutonium. In spite of its short-comings, the investigations and classified studies on understanding the equation of state on plutonium was started the physicists at the Pinstech laboratory in 1972. The Pinstech laboratory became a main research and development laboratory when it initiated its ingenious program for the production of plutonium oxide (plutonia) and uranium oxide (Urania) in 1973.

The Pinstech laboratory was also a learning center for gaining expertise in nuclear fuel cycle which it provided training to other facilities after learning the very basic knowledge from the European industries prior to 1969. At the Pinstech laboratory, a pilot plant (New Labs) was built for reprocessing spent reactor fuel into plutonium pit production. Besides its fundamental and basic programs on physical sciences, the laboratory provided a ground for the Pakistani scientists to design and engineer weapon designs, with many feared that India was rapidly developing a nuclear bomb.

As Nilore became restricted site, the research efforts were directed towards working on understanding and producing first the reactor-grade plutonium and eventually to military-grade plutonium from the spent fuel rods by undergoing a chemical process, "reprocessing". The design work had carried out on 20 different laboratories at the lab, and it was its New Labs facility of the lab that was able to produce the first batch of the weapon grade plutonium of ^{239}Pu by 1983. This weapon-grade plutonium was the source material that was carried on a nuclear test conducted at the Ras Koh Range on 30 May 1998.

=== Nuclear fuel cycle ===
The scientists at the Pinstech laboratory initiated the studies on understanding the ingenious nuclear fuel cycle in spite of having basic familiarity. In 1973, the lab conducted several studies on understanding the properties of uranium oxide, eventually producing the first fuel bundle in 1976 that was shipped to the Karachi Nuclear Power Plant to keep its grid operations running. The Pinstech also took initiatives in learning and understanding the chemistry of uranium hexafluoride, which the technology was transferred to the Islamabad Uranium Conversion Facility in 1974. In addition, the understanding of UF6 eventually led in producing the Zircaloys, which it was also produced at the lab first; and later having it transfer the technology to the Kundian Nuclear Fuel Complex in 1980.

As of today, PINSTECH has been shifted to peacetime research in medicine, biology, materials and physics. Its Molybdenum-42 facility was used to medical radioisotopes for treating cancer. Scientists from Nuclear Institute for Agriculture and Biology (NIAB) and Nuclear Institute for Food and Agriculture (NIFA) had been using the PINSTECH facilities to conduct advanced research in both medical and food sciences.

=== Plutonium research ===
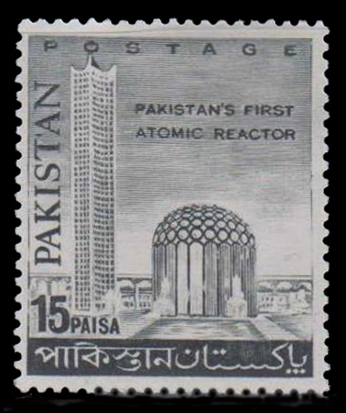
The Pakistan Post released its stamp to honor the Pinstech in 1965.

Since its repurposing in 1972, the Pinstech Laboratory conducts research into understanding the equation of state of plutonium, its phase diagrams, its properties, and its metallurgy. In 1987, the Pinstech developed a technology by fabricating a Chromium kF39 and developed an innovative technique, "in-situ leaching", which allowed the extraction of actinides from the uranium ore without the need for conventional milling.

Computer scientists at the Pinstech Laboratory had built a supercomputer based on the vintage Cray-1 IBM computer architecture that allowed physicists at the Pinstech to model the behavior of plutonium metal without actual nuclear testing. All research work on plutonium is conducted at its special-purpose facility, the New Laboratories, where the weapon-grade nuclear explosives are designed and manufactured. Much of the work on plutonium metallurgy, however, is subjected to restricted and classified information.

The Centralized Analysis Facility (CAF) has been utilized to investigate the chemistry of plutonium, while other areas of actinide sciences are studied at the Central Diagnostic Laboratory (CDL), where laser experiments on plutonium are also conducted. The two laboratories are the most potent facilities at Pinstech and demonstrate Pakistan's abilities in laser physics applications.

Besides its national security mission, the lab promotes applications of radiation and isotope technology in various scientific and technological disciplines to support the nation. It is also working on important non-nuclear fields, which are crucial for the development of science and technology in the country. In 2020, expansion work was started at Pinstech lab to help its "ability to produce isotopes for medical use, especially for preparation of radiopharmaceuticals for cancer patients while also helping the country in its aspirations in other applications of peaceful use of nuclear technology."

== Nuclear reactors ==
PINSTECH has particle accelerators and also operates two small nuclear research reactors, a reprocessing plant and another experimental neutron source based on:

- PARR-I Reactor-Utilize Low-Enriched Uranium (LEU)
- PARR-II Reactor-Utilize High-Enriched Uranium (HEU)
- New Labs-Plutonium reprocessing (PR) facility.
- Charged Particle Accelerator — a nuclear particle accelerator.
- Fast Neutron Generator — An experimental neutron generator.

== Research divisions ==
The PINSTECH four research directorates and each directorate is headed by an appointed Director-General. The following PINSTECH Divisions are listed below:

=== Directorate of Science ===
Physics Research Division (RPD)

The directorate of science consists of four division, and each divisions are headed by deputy directors-general. In 2004, the PINSTECH administration had brought together all of the groups, and were merged into one single Division, known as Physics Research Division (PRD). Meanwhile, the PINSTECH had also merged Nuclear Physics Division (NPD) and Radiation Physics Division (RPD), Nuclear and Applied Chemistry Divisions as well. The below is the list of research groups working in RPD.

- Atomic and Nuclear Radiation Group
- Fast Neutron Diffraction Group (FNDG) (Note: It was founded as Fast Neutron Physics Group by Dr. Samar Mubarakmand in 1979. The FNPG was involved in the designing of a country's first nuclear weapon)
- Electronic and Magnetic Materials Group (EMMG) (Note: The EMM Group was founded by Dr. N.M. Butt in 1966 that had produced world acclaim research in Mossbauer Spectroscopy)
- Nuclear Track Studies Group
- Nuclear Geology Group
- Laser Physics Group
- Radiation Damage Group
- Plasma Physics Group
- Diagnostics Group
- Mathematical Physics Group (MPG) (Note: The Mathematics Physics Group, otherwise known as Math Group, was founded in 1972, with Theoretical Physics Group, by Raziuddin Siddiqui who also served its first director. The Math Group was mandate to conduct mathematical calculations in implosion designs and concepts. It earned prestige in 1978 when the Group, worked under Asghar Qadir, finished the solved complex calculations involved in nuclear fission and chain reaction)
- Theoretical Physics Group (TPG) (Note: The Theoretical Physics Group or TPG, was founded and established by Dr. Abdus Salam who served its first Director in 1972 until 1974. The TPG, under Salam's directorial guidance, was tasked to developed the nuclear weapons designs and mathematical calculations involving the nuclear weapons. Later, The TPG had first successfully designed the first theoretical design and completed calculations in nuclear weapon in 1978, under Dr. Riazuddin)

Chemistry Research Division (CRD)

- Nuclear Chemistry Division (NCD) - The Nuclear Chemistry Division was founded in 1966 by Dr. Iqbal Hussain Qureshi. (Note: Dr. Iqbal Hussain Qureshi (Dr. I.H. Qureshi) was one of the leading scientists who were involved in the development of a nuclear weapon in the early 1970s. Dr. I.H. Qureshi has had led NCD in the development of fissionable materials in the device. Dr. I.H. Qureshi had famously discovered ^{6}_{3}Li+^{2}_{1}H→^{4}_{2}He+22.4 MeV equation for balancing the Q-value and energy balance in a fission device.) As of today, the division is the largest Divisions of the PINSTECH comprising five major groups. Nuclear Chemistry Division has gained experience in the characterization of reactor grade and high purity materials by using advanced analytical techniques and it is dealing with environmental and health related problems.
- Applied Chemistry Division
- Laser Development Division

=== Directorate of System and Services ===
The Directorate of System and Services (DSS, headed by Dr. Matiullah, consists of 5 research divisions: Health Physics Division (HPD), Nuclear Engineering Division (NED), Electronics Maintenance Division (EMD), General Services Division (GSD), and Computer Division (CD).

=== Directorate of Technology ===
The Directorate of Technology (D-TECH) consists of 3 divisions that are Materials Division (MD), Isotope Application Division (IAD), and the Isotope Production Division (IPD). This is currently overseen by Dr. Gulzar Hussain Zahid, Chief Engineer.

- Materials Division (MD) - Materials Division (MD) was established in 1973, with aim of to provide technical assistance to other PAEC's projects on development, production and characterization of materials.
- Isotope Application Division (IAD) - The Isotope Application Division (IAD) (Note: The Isotope Application Division (IAD)was founded by Dr. Naeem Ahmad Khan in 1971. Hafeez Qureshi was made director general of the RIAD Division. The RIAD was the first division that had put efforts in the development of the fission device in 1972.) was established in PINSTECH by Dr. Naeem Ahmad Khan in early 1971. Having known as the problem solver in the institute, the IAD is responsible for solving the problems in Isotope Hydrolog, Environmental Pollution, Non-Destructive Testing, Industrial Applications, Life Sciences, and Isotope Geology. IAD also extends expert services to solve relevant problems faced by the industrial sector and different organizations.
- Isotope Production Division (IPD) - The Isotope Production Division (IPD) (Note: The Isotope Production Division (IPD) was founded by M. Bashar Khan in 2002. M. Khalid was made Head of the RIPD Division. The RIPD was the only division generating funds and has been involved in producing and catering to nuclear medical center needs on a regular basis.) It contains Molly Group, Generator Production group, Kit production Group. IPD also involves in modification of exiting isotope production facility.

=== Directorate of Coordination ===
The Directorate of Coordination, headed by Engr. Iqbal Hussain Khan, is an administrative directorate which consists of 3 technical support divisions. Computation, Information, Communication Technologies (CICT)/Management Information System (MIS) Division, The Scientific Information Division (SID), Programme Coordination Division (PCD) are included in this division.

== Directors general (DGs) of PINSTECH ==
Numbers	Name	Timeline of Directors	Alma Mater	Field	Educational Background
1	Rafi Muhammad Chaudhry	1965–1970	University of Cambridge (Cavendish Laboratory)	Nuclear physics	Ph.D
2	Abdus Salam	1970–1971	Imperial College	Theoretical physics	Ph.D.
3	Ishfaq Ahmad	1971–1976	Université de Montréal (Montreal Laboratory)	Nuclear physics	D.Sc.
4	Munir Ahmad Khan	1976–1977	North Carolina State University (Argonne National Laboratory)	Nuclear engineering	Master of Science (M.Sc.)
5	Naeem Ahmad Khan	1977–1984	University of Manchester	Nuclear physics	Ph.D.
6	Iqbal Hussain Qureshi	1986–1991	University of Tokyo	Nuclear chemistry	Ph.D.
7	Noor Muhammad Butt	1991–1996	University of Birmingham	Nuclear physics	D.Sc.
8	Hameed Ahmad Khan	1996–2000	University of Birmingham	Nuclear, Space, and reactor physics	D.Sc. and Ph.D.
9	Mustansar Jehangir	2000–2005	University of Birmingham	Nuclear chemistry	Ph.D.
10	Masud Ahmad	2005–2007	Imperial College	Theoretical physics	Ph.D.
11	Ansar Pervaiz	2007–2010	Rensselaer Polytechnic Institute	Nuclear engineering	Ph.D.
12	Syed Jamshed Hussain Zaidi	2010–Present	University of Peshawar, Forschungszentrum Jülich	Nuclear chemistry	Ph.D.
