= Kirana Hills Site =

Pakistan Ministry of Defense range in Punjab

Kirana Hills
- Kirana PAF
- Part of PAF Base Mushaf
- Sargodha, Pakistan; Near Sargodha, Punjab in Pakistan
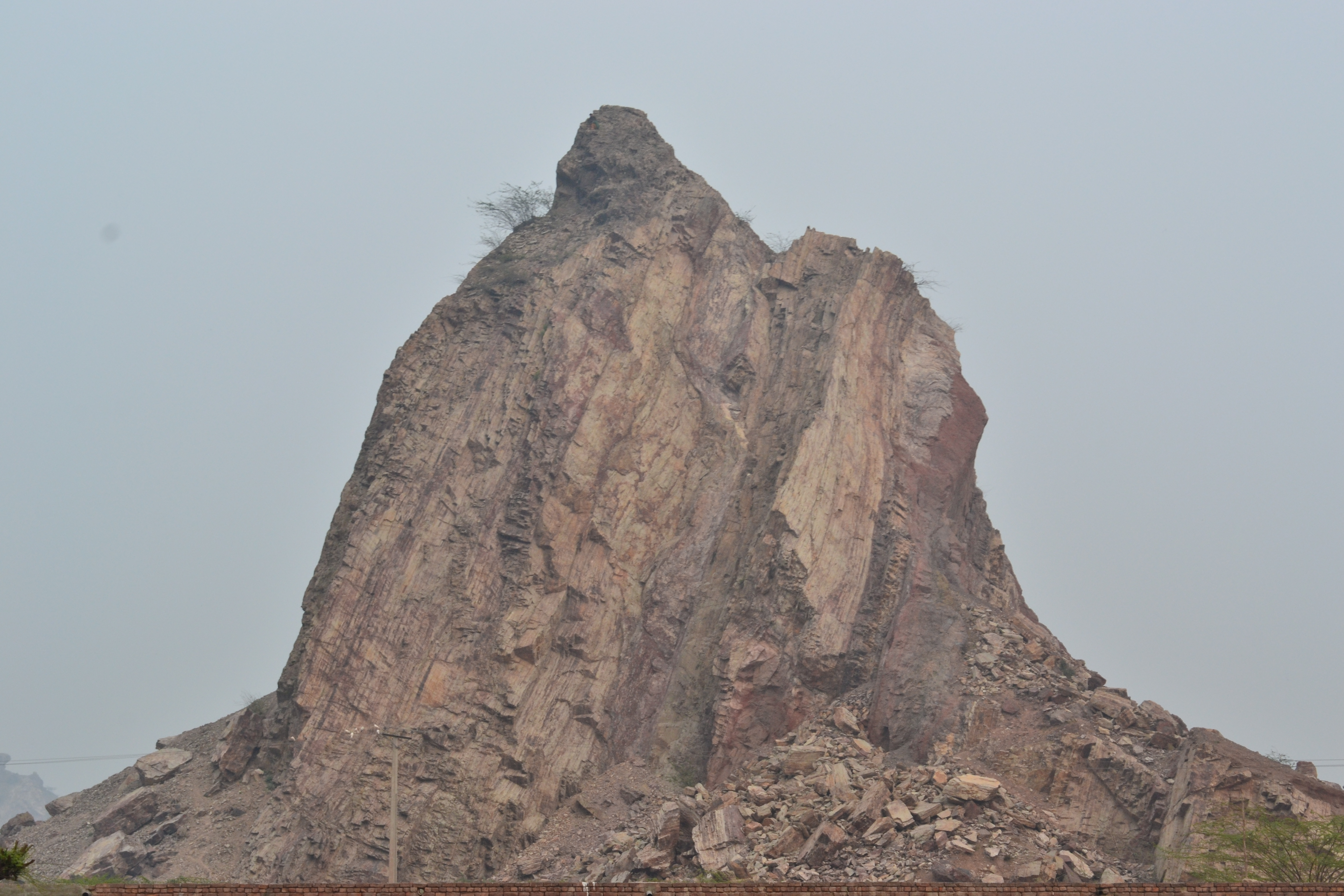
- The summit of Kirana Hills.

Site information
- Type: Radar and Weapons Complex
- Owner: Ministry of Defense
- Operator: National Defence Complex (Main contractor)
- Controlled by: Pakistan Air Force
- Open to the public: Yes
- Status: Active
- Defining authority: Geological Survey of Pakistan (GSP)

Location
- Location within Pakistan
- Coordinates: 31°57′59″N 72°42′09″E
- Area: 100 sq mi (260 km^{2})
- Height: 1,050 ft (320 m)
- Length: 12 mi (19 km)

Site history
- Built: 1979
- Built by: Pakistan Army Corps of Engineers
- In use: 1981–95

Garrison information
- Garrison: No. 4091 Squadron

Test information
- Subcritical tests: 24 under Kirana-I
- Remediation: 1995

The Kirana Hills Site is an extensive rocky mountain range and a reservation of the Ministry of Defense (MoD) and nuclear arsenal storage location of Pakistan army, located in Sargodha, Punjab, Pakistan. Known locally as "Black Mountains" due to its brownish landscape, it is expanded between the township of Rabwah and the metropolitan city of Sargodha.

It is considered as a sacred hill by the Hindu community. It was an active pilgrimage site before partition, with annual festival being celebrated.

The highest peak of the Kirana Hills is measured at 1,050 ft (320 m) with average peaks at highest peak is about 600 feet (180 m).

== Overview ==
=== Etymology ===
The Kirana Hills is a series of bedrock hills that were named after a small village that once resided before the villagers moved to the township of Rabwah (now Chanab Nagar) and the planned city of Sargodha.

=== Topography and geology ===
The Kirana Hills is an extensive rocky mountain range located in the Sargodha District, and about 80 mi (130 km) in distance from the Salt Range. In 1913, British geologists conducted extensive investigations on the rock formations in the Kirana Hills, which are different from the rest of its parent mountains ranges; the rocks are noticeably black in formation.

The highest peak at the Kirana Hills is measured exactly at 1,050 ft (320 m) by the British surveyors from the level of the plain in 1913. The average height in the Kirana Hills are recorded at 600 ft (180 m) by the Geological Survey of Pakistan (GSP) in their studies of hydrology reports in 1967. The Kirana Hills are expanded and scattered over an area of about 100 sq mi (260 km^{2}) and about 12 mi (19 km) in length.

According to the Pakistani scientific investigations, the rocks are mainly hardened shales and slates with minor amount of quartzites which contained with layers of hematite, thin bands of rhyolites, tuff and diabase.

In 1970s, the Geological Survey of Pakistan conducted a survey to find uranium ores and began the mining of uranium after its geologists confirmed the deposits of uranium ores at the Kirana Hills.

=== Climate and wildlife ===
The landform of the Kirana Hills is known to be a steppe with heavy grassland besides the Rocky Mountains. The Pakistan Meteorological Department reported its weather conditions to be extreme with the highest have been recorded to 50 °C (122 °F) in the summer while the minimum temperature recorded is as low as freezing point 0 °C (32 °F) in the winter.

Its environs are heavily infested with wild boars.

== Venue ==
=== Radar and weapons complex ===
In 1970, the Ministry of Defense (MoD) acquired the Kirana Hills as a defense site for the Pakistan Air Force. The Pakistan Air Force established a radar station with the commissioning of the No. 4091 Squadron at the Kirana Hills, which is still in commission at the Kirana Hills. The Kirana Hills forms a larger part of the Mushaf Air Force Base in Sargodha, which falls into its area of command.

In 1978–79, the Pakistan Army Corps of Engineers acquired the range for the possible test sites and began its boring operations for the tunnels measuring 100 to 150 feet (30 to 46 m) in length, as a potential for nuclear test sites.

According to Pakistani admissions, there have been forty-six short tunnels that were bored, with Special Development Works (SDW) constructing the two horizontal and three vertical underground line of sight sites to withheld 24–40 kilotonnes of TNT (100–170 TJ) of energy blast from the nuclear weapons. At one of its tunnels the Chinese M-11 missiles were once housed before the United States Intelligence found out, and moved the missiles for further testings at an unknown locations by the Air Force.

=== Subcritical testing activities ===
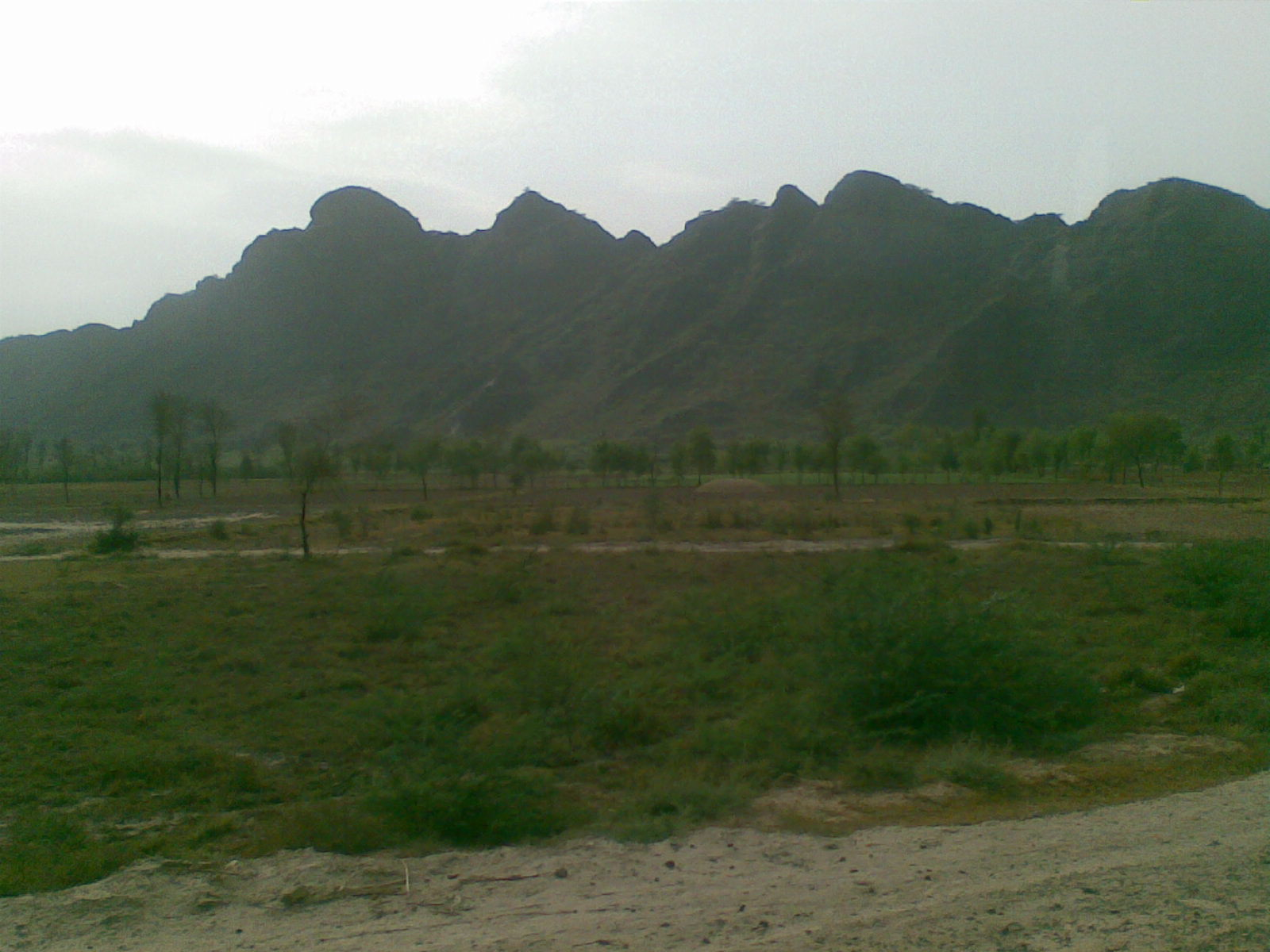
Kirana Hills on Faisalabad Road, Sargodha.

The Kirana-I was the codename for the 24 subcritical physical experiments on nuclear weapon designs that took place under the leadership of the Pakistan Air Force with the Pakistan's national defense laboratories between 1983 and 1995.

The first subcritical experiment on physics package was carried out on 11 March 1983 but the subcritical experiments are not true full-scale nuclear weapon testing.

The Pakistan Institution of Nuclear Science & Technology (Pinstech), Metallurgical Laboratories (ML), and the Khan Research Laboratories (KRL) conducted various investigations and studies on dynamical properties of materials, radiation effects, and secondary weapon assessments for the nuclear explosive devices at the Kirana base to validate the viability of the nuclear weapons before conducting nuclear testing.

The subcritical physics experiments proved crucial in understanding and preparing the physical package to evolved into a weapon pits to be delivered by the Pakistan Air Force's combat aircraft stationed at the Sargodha Air Force Base.

Boring and tunnel operations were carried out at night to avoid the American detection from its satellites fixated on the region. The army engineers also worked on relocating the wildlife, specifically the wild boars, to stay out of the weapon-testing tunnels before the diagnosticians housed the tunnels. The tunnels at the Kirana Hills are composed of multiple cables, line-of-sight screen boxes, oscillators, computers, and other diagnostics equipments were installed by the national laboratories' diagnostics teams.

First diagnostics test on a working nuclear weapon device was reportedly designed in vintage style, which had the push-button to create an electronic circuit. The push-button mechanism, however, was replaced with laser activation system after the error was discovered during the trigger testing. The HMX and PBX explosives were prepared for number of subcritical experiments by the weapon-testing laboratories. This first subcritical physics experiment was carried out on 11 March 1983.

=== Merger with PAF Base Mushaf ===
In 1995, the Pakistan Air Force took over the host responsibilities for the nation's military nuclear weapons program. With the Clinton administration continuously monitoring the region, the Ministry of Defense (MoD) moved the subcritical experiments to unknown location in Kala Chitta Range, which is in Khyber-Pakhtunkhwa. The Pakistani government released a tender for the remediation works at the Kirana Hills opened the parts of the site for public tourism in 1995.

In spite of its clean-up, the Kirana Base is still in commissioned as a principle nuclear installation site for the Pakistan Air Force, according to the Indian intelligence analysts.

== See also ==
- List of mountain ranges of Pakistan
- List of mountains in Pakistan

== Sources ==
=== Bibliography ===
- Ali, Waqar A. Jehangir, Asad Sarwar Qureshi, Nazim (2002). Conjunctive water management in the Rechna Doab : an overview of resources and issues. Lahore: International Water Management Institute. p. 57. ISBN 978-9290904892.
- DoE&ES, Department of Earth and Environmental Sciences (2012). "Special report: Field report on Kirana Hills" (.net). Karachi, Sindh, Pakistan: Bahria University press. p. 33.
- Oriental Geographer. East Pakistan Geographical Society. 1964.
- Records of the Geological Survey of India. Geological Survey of India. 1913.
- Greenman, David W.; Bennett, Gordon D.; Swarzenski, Wolfgang Victor (1967). Ground-water Hydrology of the Punjab, West Pakistan, with Emphasis on Problems Caused by Canal Irrigation. U.S. Government Printing Office.
- Mahajan, Gautam (2009). Ground water : surveys and investigation. New Delhi: A P H Pub. Corp. p. 527. ISBN 978-8131304747.
- Shaikh, A. Rashid (2000). The Story of the Pakistan Air Force, 1988-1998: A Battle Against Odds. Karachi, SIND, Pakistan: Shaheen Foundation. p. 414. ISBN 978-969-8553-00-5.
- Smith, Mark A. (2007). Settlement geography of the Punjab during the early historic and medieval periods: A GIS approach. p. 400. ISBN 978-0549431725.
- Khan, Feroz Hassan (2012). Eating Grass: The Making of the Pakistan Atomic Bomb. Palo Alto, Calif, U.S.: Stanford University Press. p. 521. ISBN 978-0804784801.
- Futter, Andrew (2015). The Politics of Nuclear Weapons. L.A. Calif. U.S.: Sage. p. 210. ISBN 978-1473917149.
- Rabinowitz, Or (2014). Bargaining on Nuclear Test. London U.K.: Oxford University Press. p. 244. ISBN 978-0191007439.
- Verma, Anand K. (2001). Reassessing Pakistan: Role of Two Nation Theory. New Delhi: Lancer. p. 277. ISBN 978-8170622871.
