= Nilore =

Nilore نیلور
- City
- Location in Islamabad Capital Territory Location in Pakistan
- Coordinates: 33.65265168367541°N 73.24529118160538°E
- Country: Pakistan
- Province: Islamabad Capital Territory
- Established: 1967
- Time zone: UTC+5 (PST)

Nilore (Urdu: نیلور) is a townsite-city in the Islamabad Capital Territory of Pakistan, located and established in the district limit of Islamabad. The city is located around 25 kilometers south-east of Islamabad, and controlled under the Islamabad Police to ensure the law and justice in the city.

The Pakistan Institute of Nuclear Science & Technology (PINSTECH), covering around 400 acres, and the Pakistan Institute of Engineering & Applied Sciences (PIEAS) are located in Nilore, where key nuclear research takes place.

Nilore hosted an apex scientific research in the 1960s led under Abdus Salam,

== Pakistan Institute of Engineering and Applied Sciences ==
PIEAS is an institution in Pakistan. It was ranked amongst the Top 400 in the QS World University Rankings 2023. It has been producing engineers for Pakistan for many decades. PIEAS is an affordable option. It also provides various scholarship programs.
