= Hayward Alker =

American professor (1937–2007)

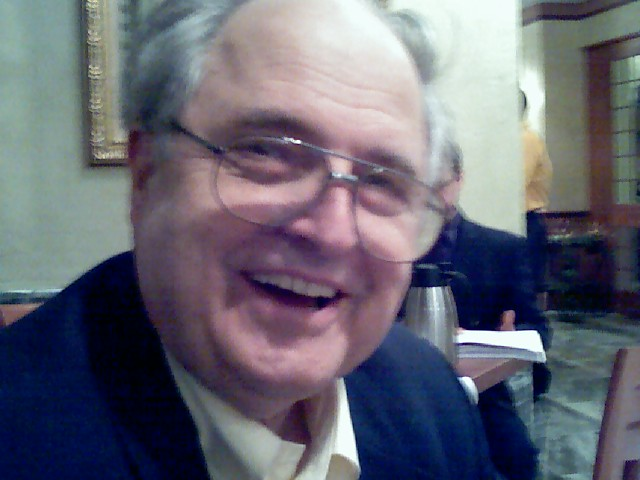
Professor Hayward Alker at the 2007 ISA Convention

Hayward R. Alker (1937 – 2007) was a professor of international relations at the University of Southern California School of International Relations, the Massachusetts Institute of Technology (MIT), and Yale University. Alker was also former president of the International Studies Association and John A. McCone Chair in International Security at the School of International Relations, University of Southern California. Dr. Alker specialized in research methods, core international relations theory, international politics, and security.

== Education ==
He received his B.S. in mathematics from MIT, and both his M.A. and Ph.D. in political science from Yale University.

== Career ==
Hayward Alker served as John A. McCone Professor of International Relations at USC from 1995 until his death in 2007. Previously, he was a senior professor of political science at MIT, and before that was a full professor at Yale by age 29. From 1992 to 1993, he was the president of the International Studies Association (ISA). Alker received appointments as a visiting professor at a number of institutions, including Brown University, University of Wales, Aberystwyth, and the University of Michigan. In the Spring of 1987 and in the Spring of 1989, Alker was a Fellow at the Swedish Collegium for Advanced Study in Uppsala, Sweden. He was the first Olof Palme Professor at the University of Uppsala and Stockholm University in Sweden. He was awarded a 1996 fellowship to study chaos theory at the Santa Fe Institute.

== Research and influence ==
His 1996 book Rediscoveries and Reformulations: Humanistic Methodologies for International Studies (Cambridge U, ISBN 978-0-521-46130-6) collected his essays that offer humanistic alternatives to the conventional scientific approaches within international studies. Alker was one of the 12 key contemporary thinkers covered in the 1997 book "The Future of International Relations," edited by Iver Neumann. His writings have influenced numerous scholars.

His former students recall his generosity with time and his intellectual creativity. Rather than rewarding only the PhD students who followed his own research program, as some professors do, he stimulated and inspired a wide variety of budding intellects. Prof. Joshua Goldstein wrote: "He was consciously, purposefully multi-methodological and multi-theoretical. He always pushed his students to find other theoretical perspectives and to use multiple methodologies. That had a huge effect on my career." Prof. Thomas J. Biersteker wrote: "When I think of the intellectual legacy of Hayward Alker, a number of phrases come immediately to mind – enormous intellect, insatiable curiosity, exuberant enthusiasm for ideas, intellectual breadth, extraordinary generosity, and most of all, immense vitality... Hayward had an influence on the profession and scholarship of international relations that went far beyond the small number of us who were fortunate enough to have been his students... I have received testimonies from prominent scholars at Oxford, Brown, and the Graduate Institute of International Studies, Geneva – from individuals who were never formally students of Hayward's – about his impact on their work." Prof. Patrick Jackson wrote: "He was a thoughtful reader even of the work of a young scholar who had not been one of his students, or even one of his grandstudents. I find that attitude somewhat rare in academia these days... And his enthusiasm -- for methodological pluralism, for humanistic-but-rigorous IR scholarship, for ideas -- was contagious!"

A memorial conference in his honor was held at the Watson Institute for International Studies, Brown University, 6–7 June 2008. A festschrift in his honor resulted in a book, Alker and IR: Global Studies in an Interconnected World (Routledge 2011, ISBN 978-0-415-61597-6), edited by Renée Marlin-Bennett. Another book, edited by Tahir Amin, is entitled World Orders in Central Asia: Essays in honor of Hayward R. Alker (Brown University, forthcoming). The Department of International Relations at Quaid-i-Azam University in Islamabad, Pakistan, inaugurated the Dr Hayward R. Alker Library in his honor in 2009, containing hundreds of books and papers from Alker's collection.

The USC Center for International Studies has a Post-Doctoral Research Fellowship named in his honor. The ISA posthumously recognized him with its Susan Strange Award, which recognizes a person whose intellect most challenges conventional wisdom in the international studies community.

Social scientists whom Alker taught include Robert Axelrod, Mitchel Wallerstein, Thomas Biersteker, Takashi Inoguchi, Thomas Homer-Dixon, Tahir Amin, Ijaz Gilani, Peter M. Haas, Renee Marlin-Bennett, Gavan Duffy, L.H.M. Ling, Dale D. Murphy, Laura Sjoberg, Joshua Goldstein, Roger Hurwitz, John C. Mallery, Loren King, Eileen de los Reyes, Neta Crawford, William D. Stanley, Sinan Birdal, Eric Blanchard, Paul T. Levin, and Yong Wook Lee. Other scholars he significantly influenced include Patrick Jackson and Andrei Tsygankov.

== Personal life ==
Alker was born in New York City in 1937 and raised in Greenwich, CT. He attended Brunswick School, where he was the first student in the school's history to earn straight A's. He was married to J. Ann Tickner, also a professor of international relations at USC. They have three daughters. He sang with a leading Los Angeles County sacred choral group, Cantori Domino, with whom he toured Italy in summer 2007.

Alker died on August 24, 2007, at the age of 69, after suffering a cerebral hemorrhage at his family's summer home in Block Island, R.I.

== Publications ==
- Alker, Hayward (2001). Journeys Through Conflict: Narratives and Lessons. Rowman & Littlefield Publishers, Inc. ISBN 0-7425-1027-1.
- Alker, Hayward (1996). Rediscoveries and Reformulations: Humanistic Methodologies for International Studies. Cambridge University Press. ISBN 0-521-46695-4.
- Alker, Hayward (1996). Challenging Boundaries: Global Flows, Territorial Identities. University of Minnesota Press. ISBN 0-8166-2699-5.
- Alker, Hayward (1965). Mathematics and politics. Macmillan. ASIN: B0007DMQ3O.

== See also ==
- University of Southern California School of International Relations
- University of Southern California
- International Relations
- Laurie Brand Director of the School of International Relations
