= List of Quaid-i-Azam University people =

List of people related to Quaid-i-Azam University

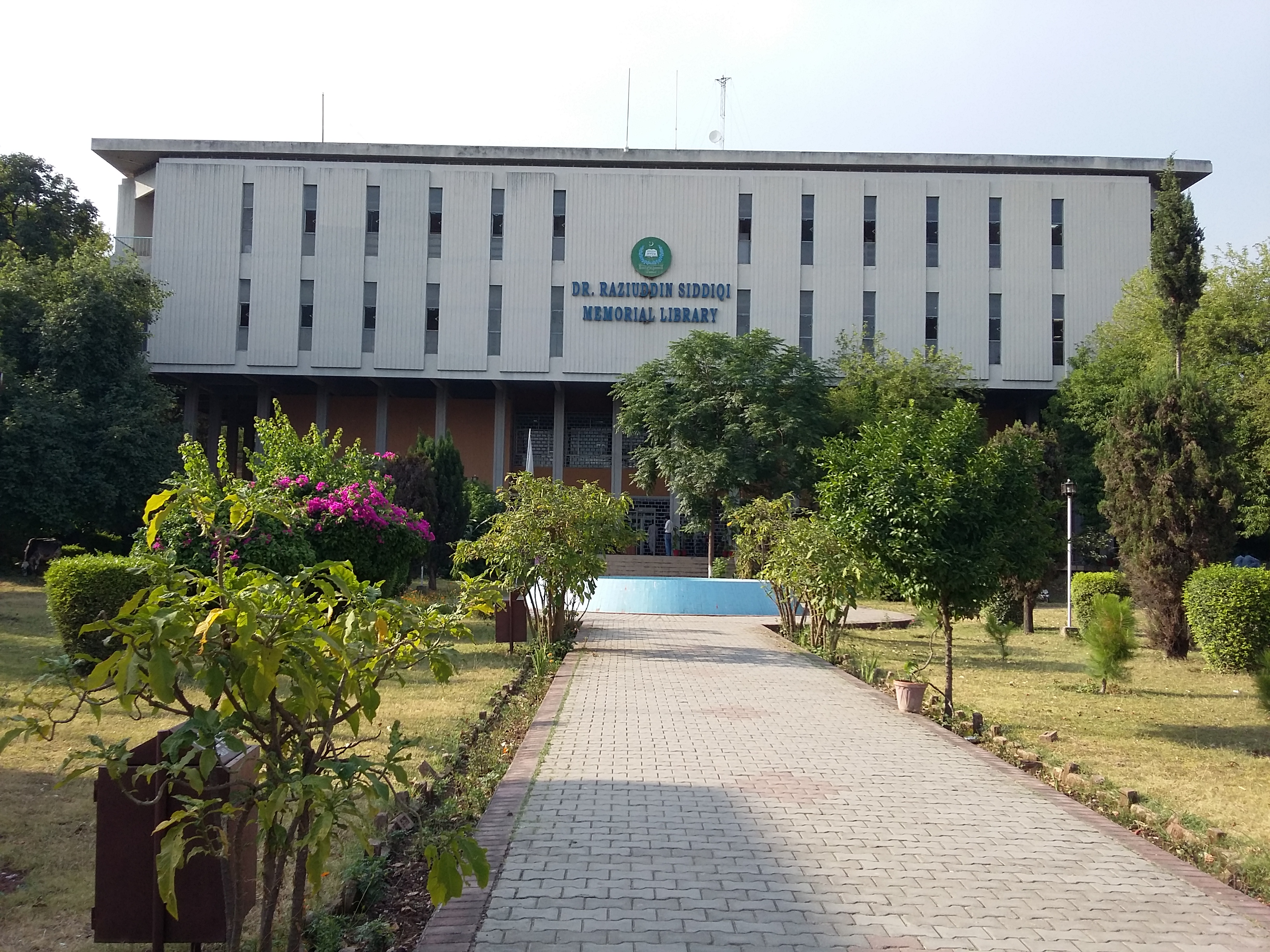
Quaid-e-Azam University Islamabad

This list of Quaid-i-Azam University people includes notable alumni, professors, and administrators associated with the Quaid-i-Azam University.

== Alumni ==
- Abdul Rashid Ghazi
- Abrar ul Haq
- Hamza Ali Abbasi
- Mian Muhammad Aslam Iqbal
- Alamgir Hashmi
- Ansar Pervaiz
- Arshad Sharif
- Fayyazuddin
- Irshad Hussain
- Hareem Farooq
- Ilhan Niaz
- Khadija Mushtaq
- Maliha Lodhi
- Marriyum Aurangzeb
- Mazhar Mahmood Qurashi
- Muhammad Sharif
- Muhammad Suhail Zubairy
- Nasim Zehra
- Nargis Sethi
- Nisar Ali Khan
- Pervaiz Iqbal Cheema
- Pervez Hoodbhoy
- Qaiser Mushtaq
- Qamar-uz-Zaman Chaudhry
- Rana Mubashir
- Zafarullah Khan
- Shamshad Akhtar
- Shireen Mazari
- Tahir Amin
- Tasneem M. Shah

== Faculty ==
- Aasim Sajjad Akhtar
- Ahmed Hassan Dani
- Akbar S. Ahmed
- Asghar Qadir
- Fayyazuddin
- Ismat Beg
- Ilhan Niaz
- Maliha Lodhi
- Raziuddin Siddiqui
- Zia Mian

== Photo gallery ==
Notable people of Quaid-i-Azam University

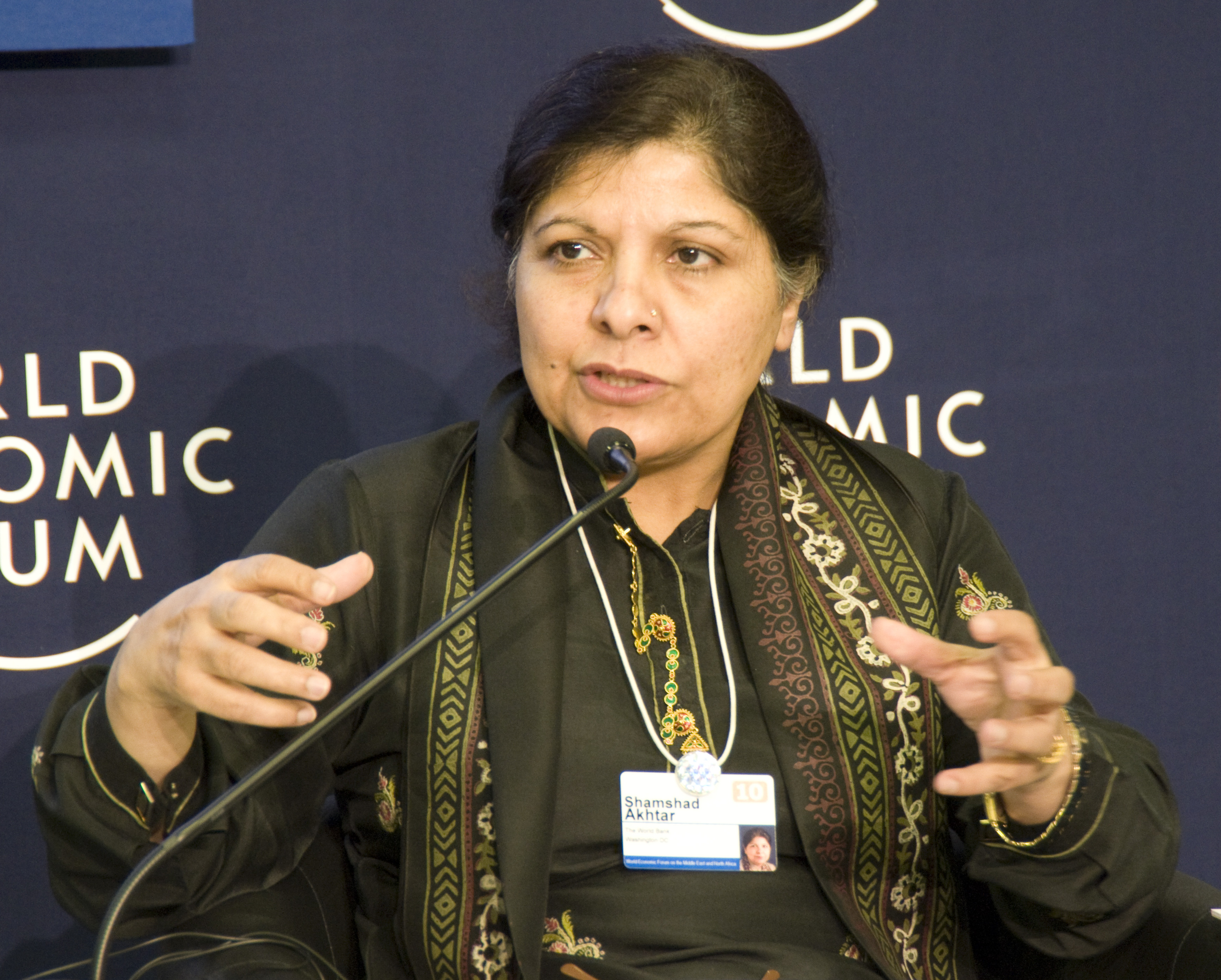
Shamshad Akhtar served as the vice president of the World Bank.

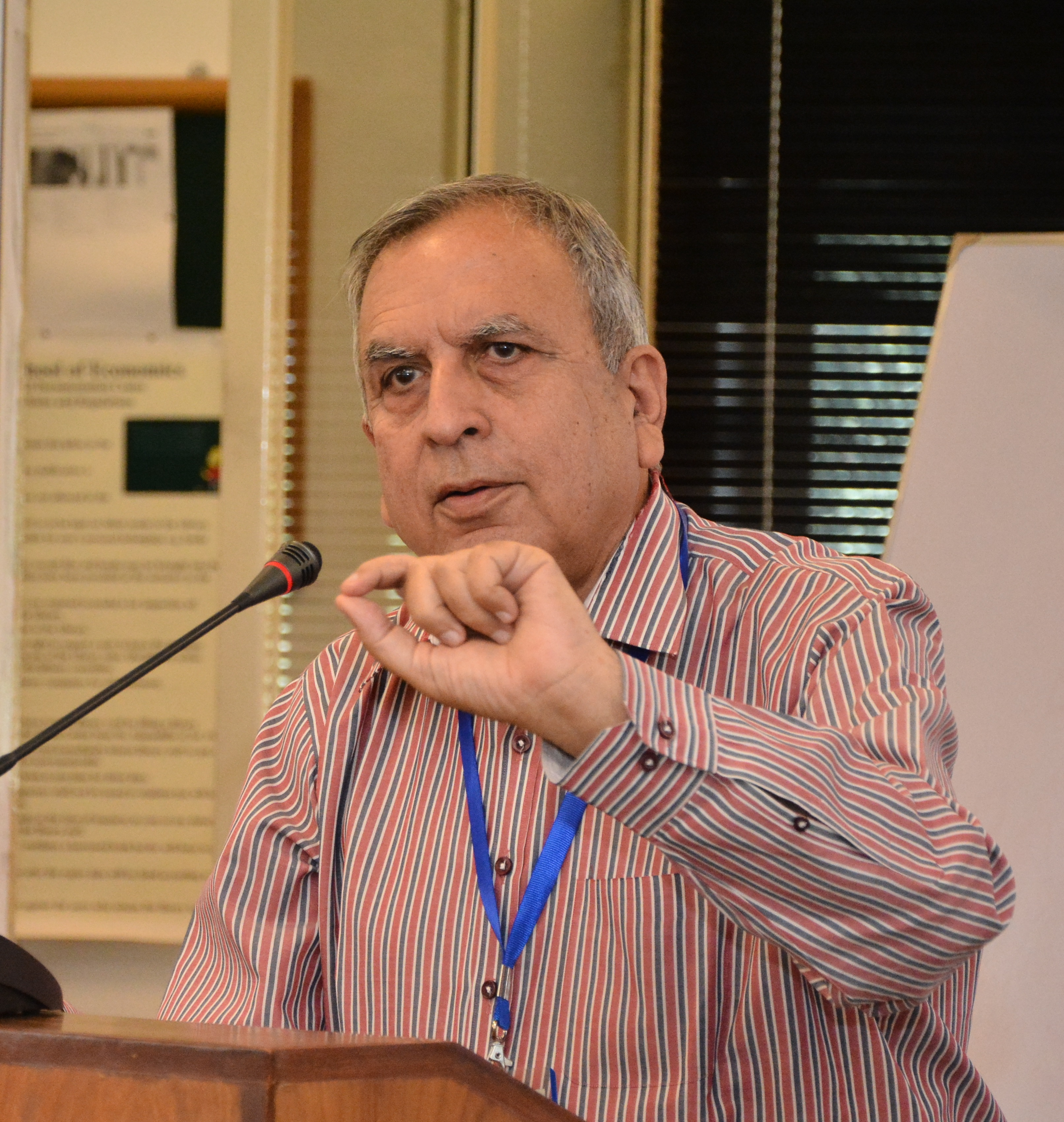
Ismat Beg mathematician, known for his work on Multiple-criteria decision analysis, and fixed point (mathematics)

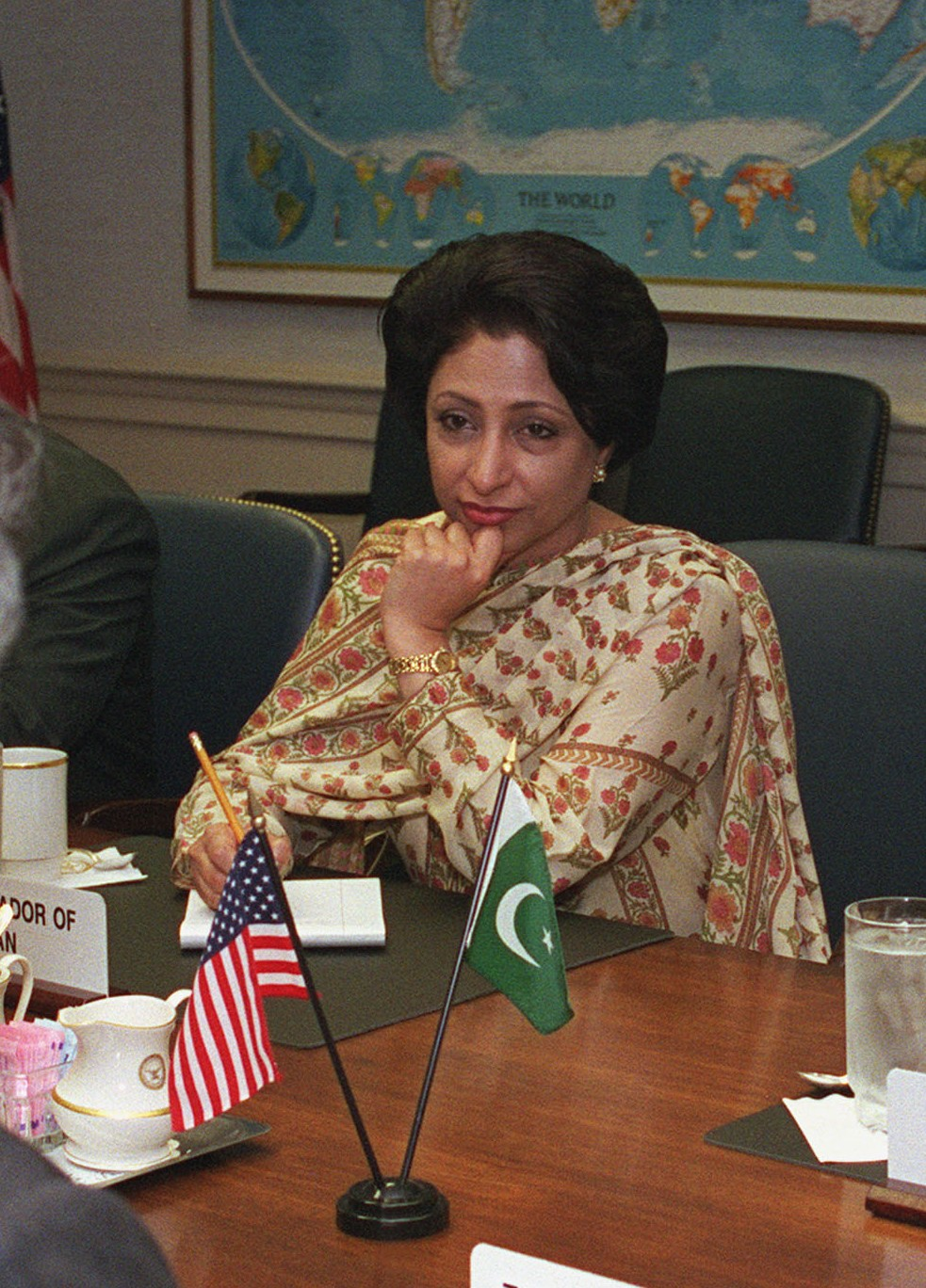
Dr. Maliha Lodhi is a leading Pakistani diplomat.

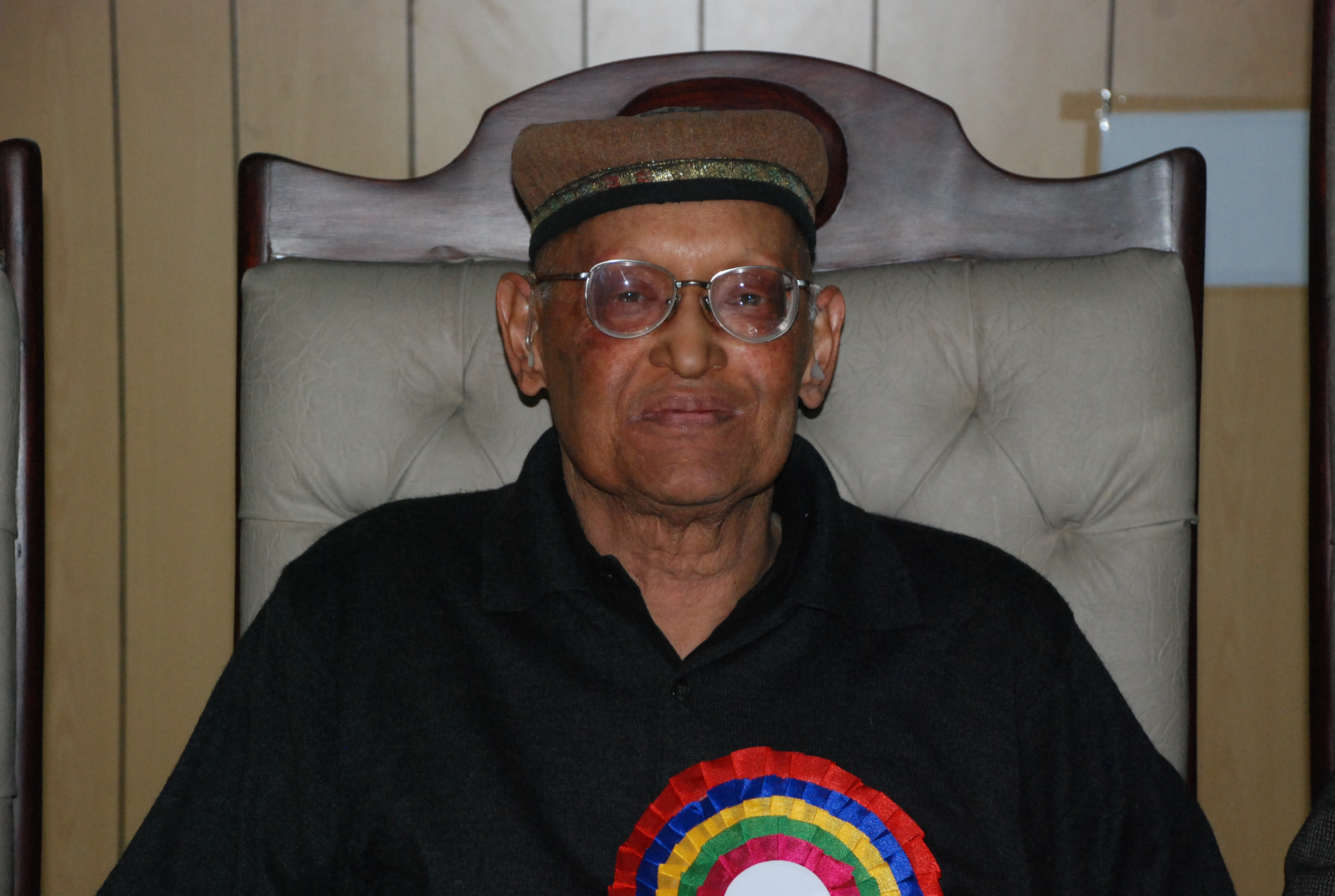
Asghar Qadir is a Pakistani mathematician and a prominent cosmologist.

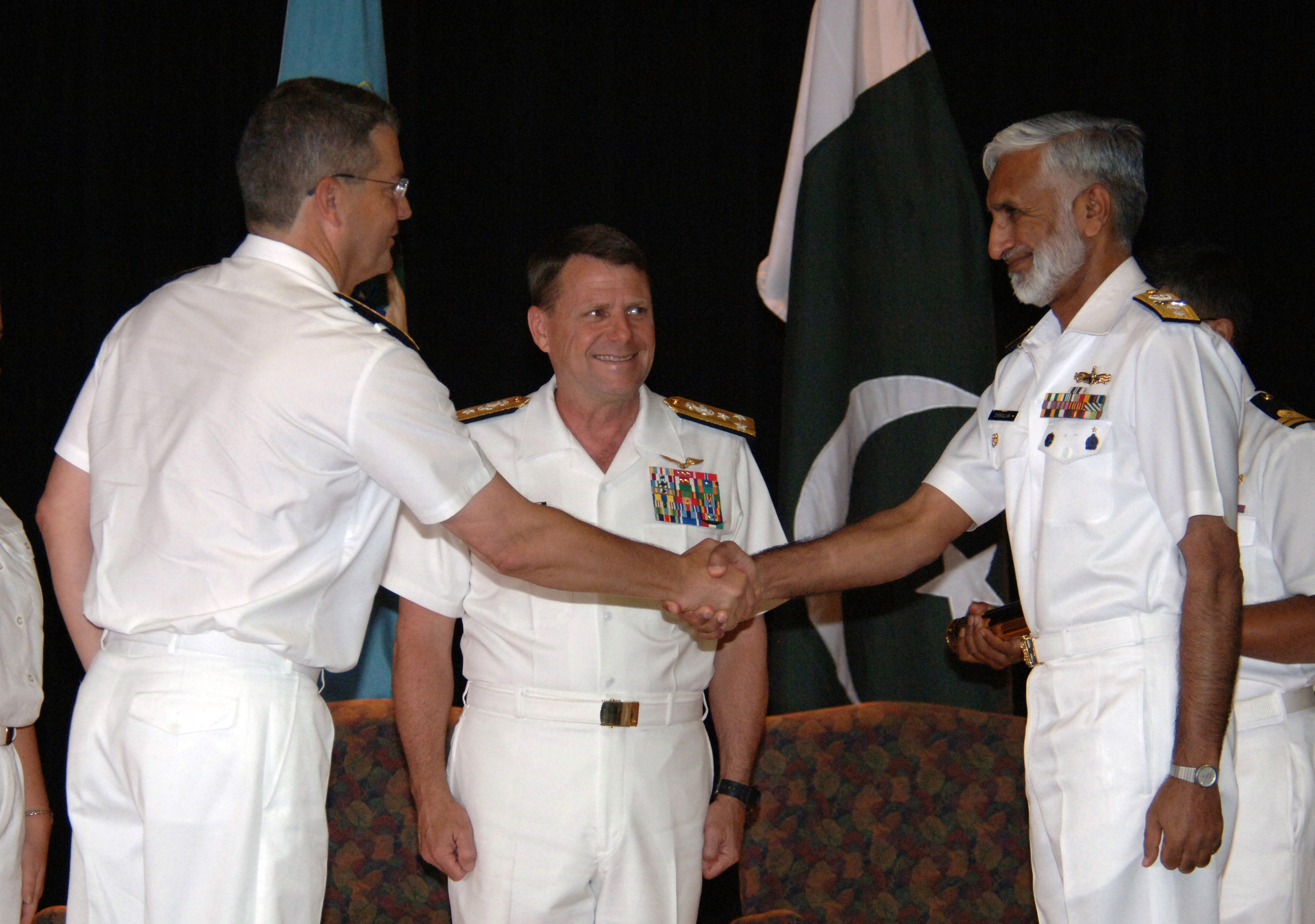
Muhammad Zakaullah former Chief of Naval Staff

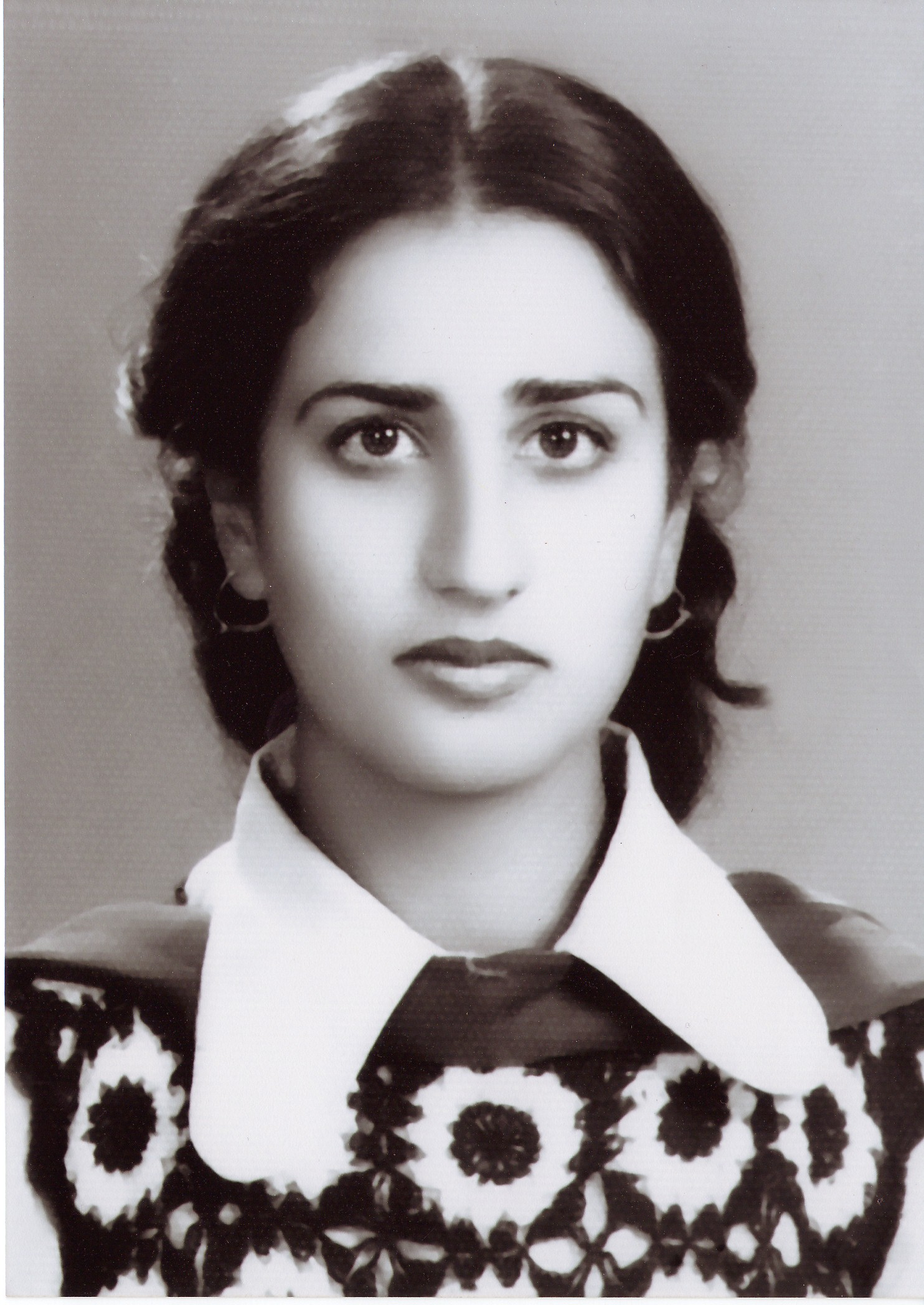
Naela Chohan is a Pakistani diplomat and women rights activist.

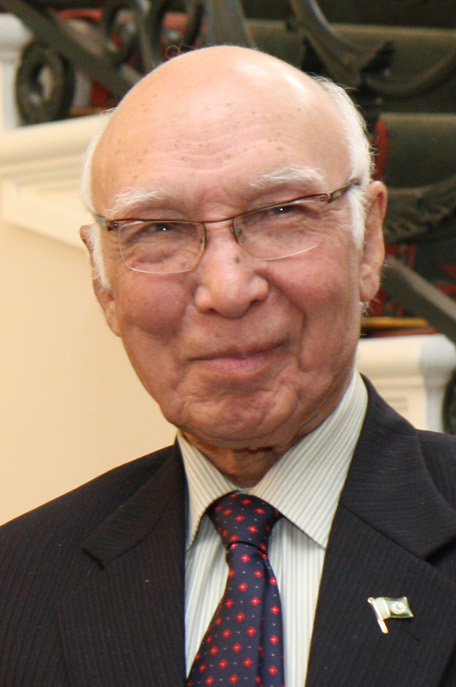
Sartaj Aziz is a Pakistani economist and a strategist who serves as the Minister for Foreign Affairs.

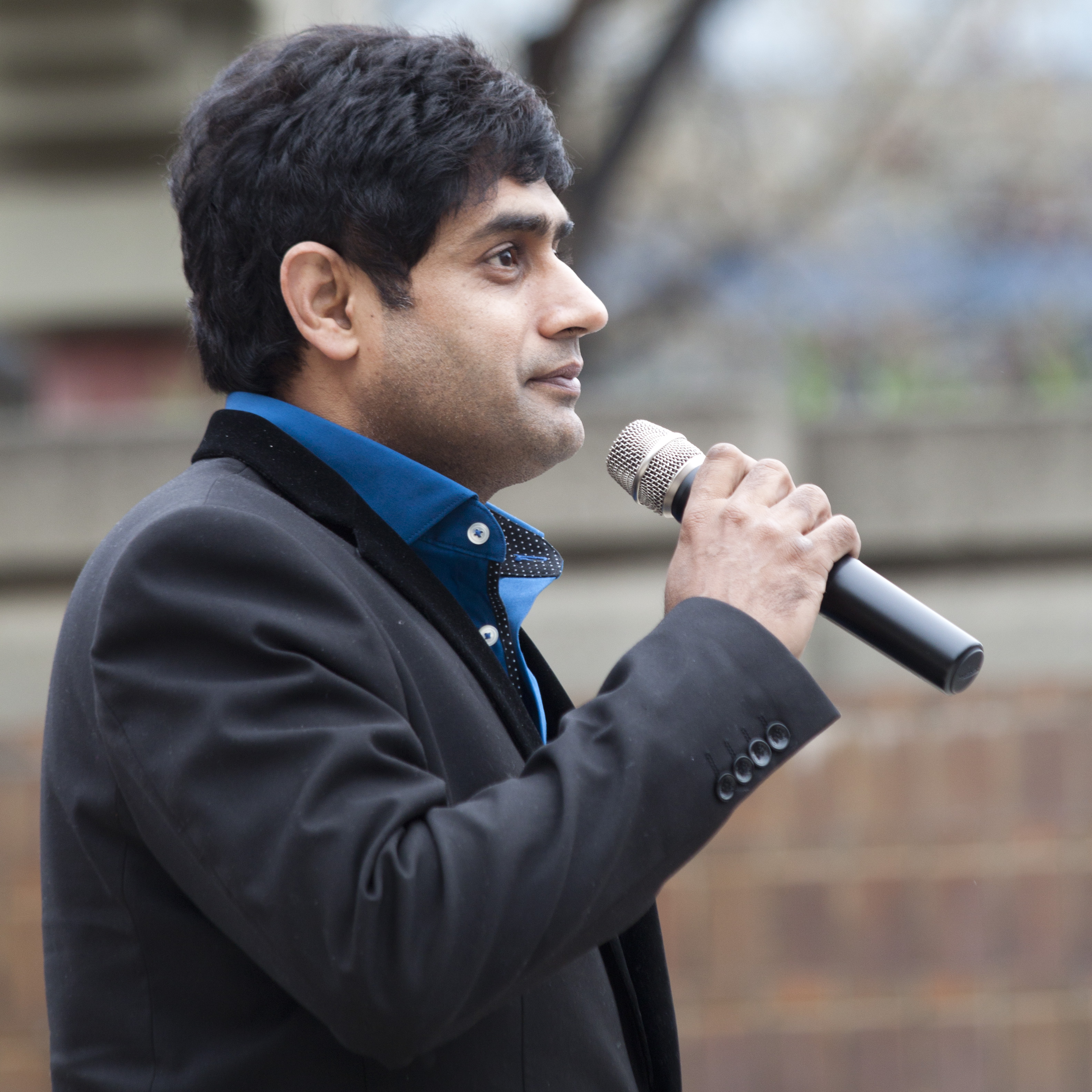
Abrar-ul-Haq is a Pakistani musician and politician.

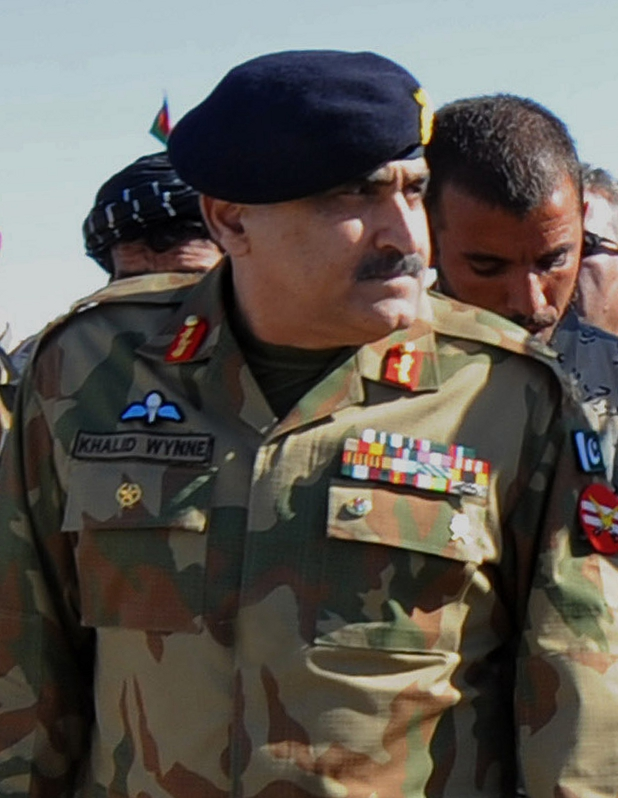
General Khalid Shameem Wynne is a retired Pakistani four-star general officer.

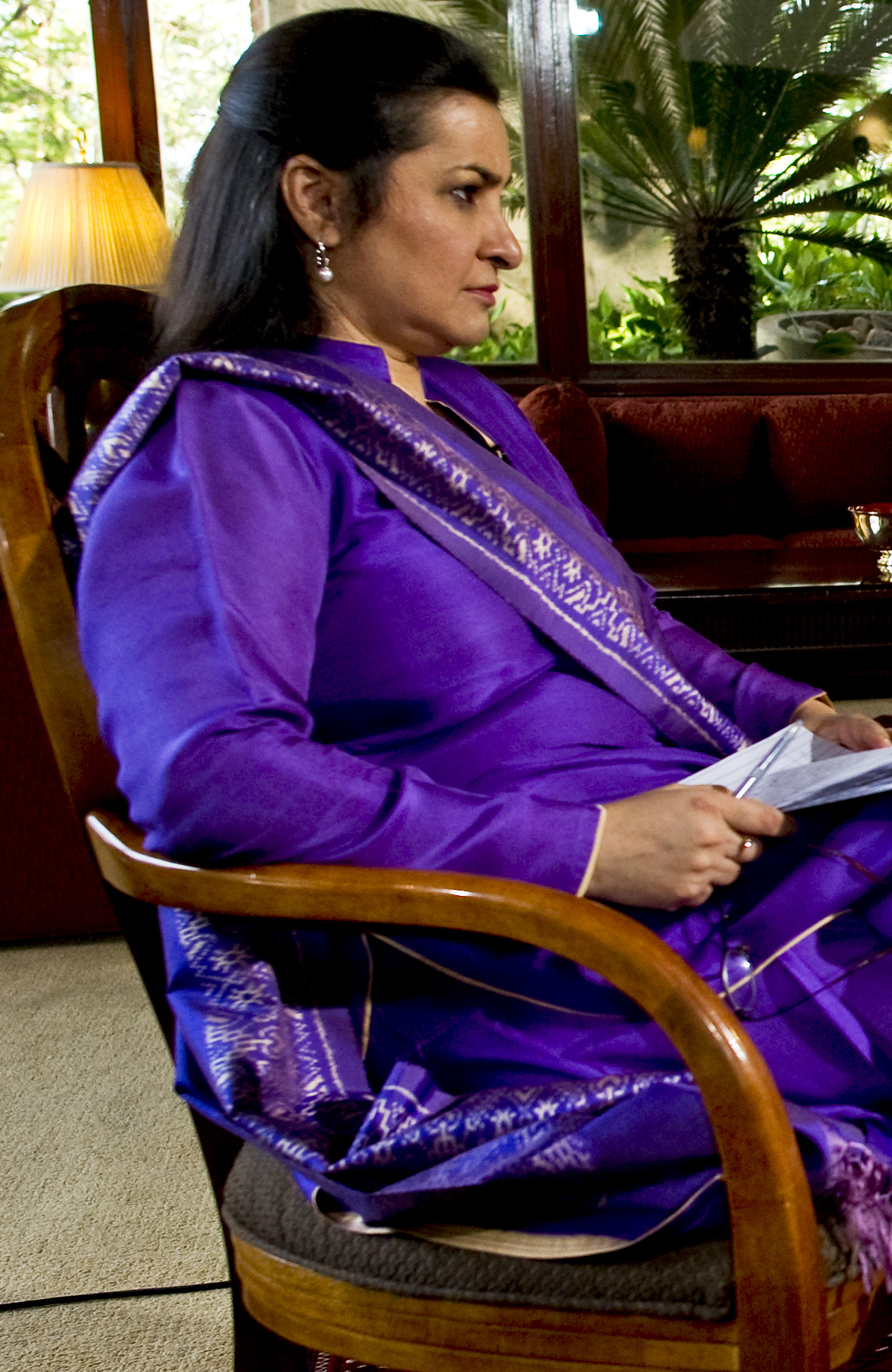
Nasim Zehra is a leading journalist.

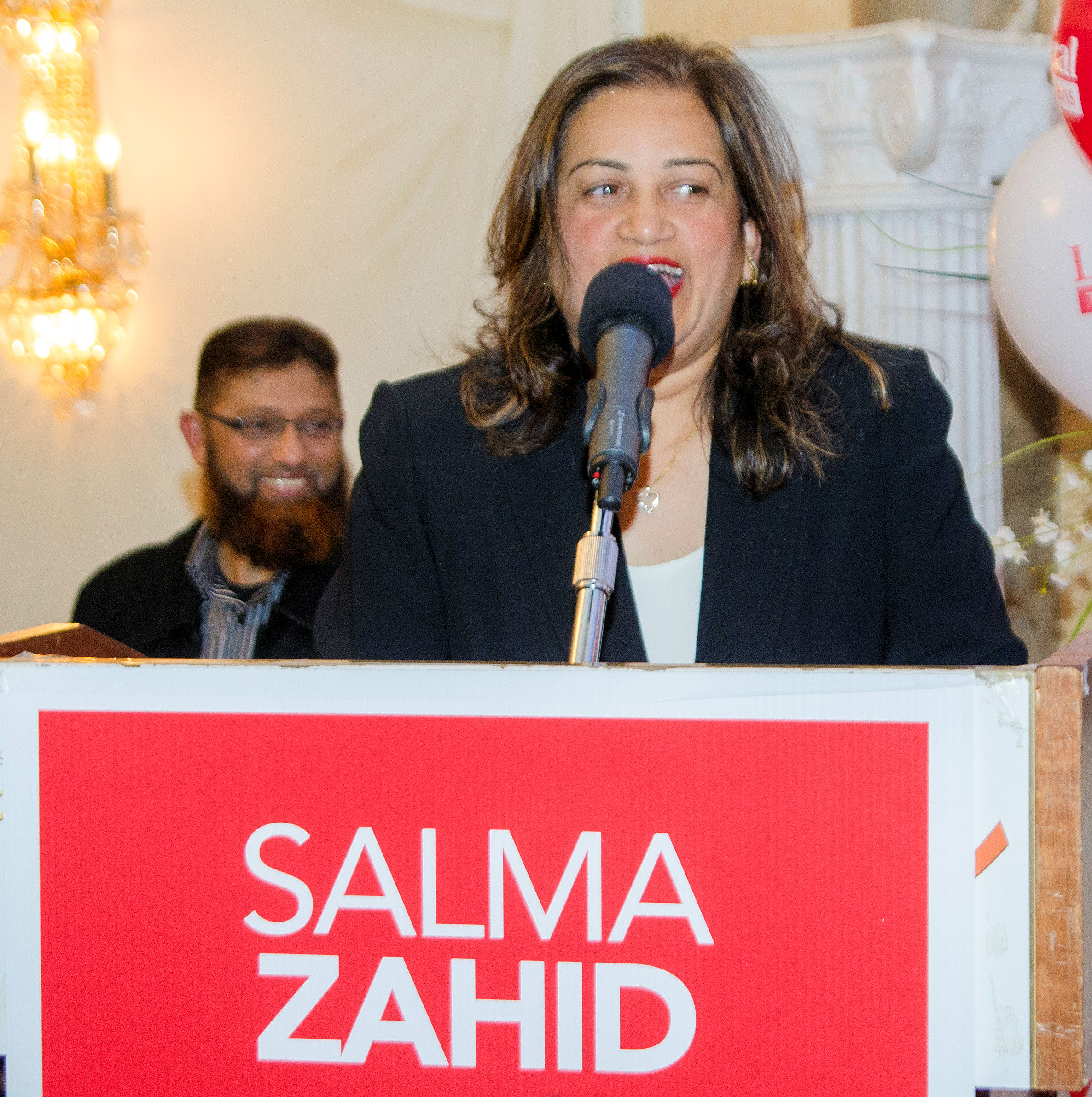
Salma Zahid as a Member of Parliament of Canada.

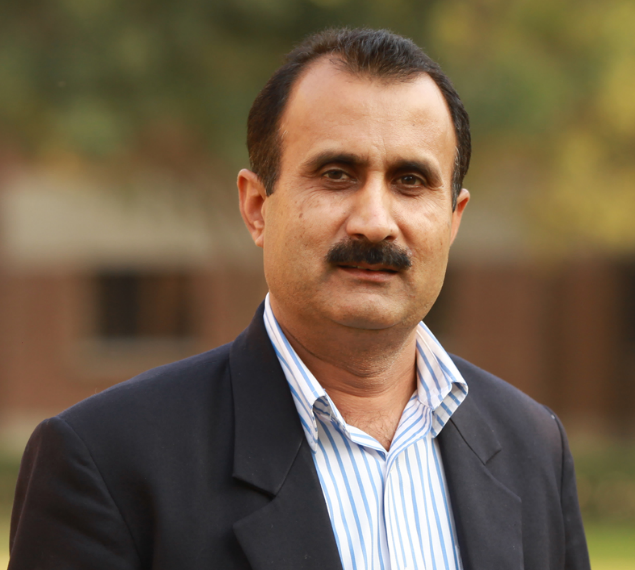
Irshad Hussain is a Pakistani chemist and Nanomaterials scientist.

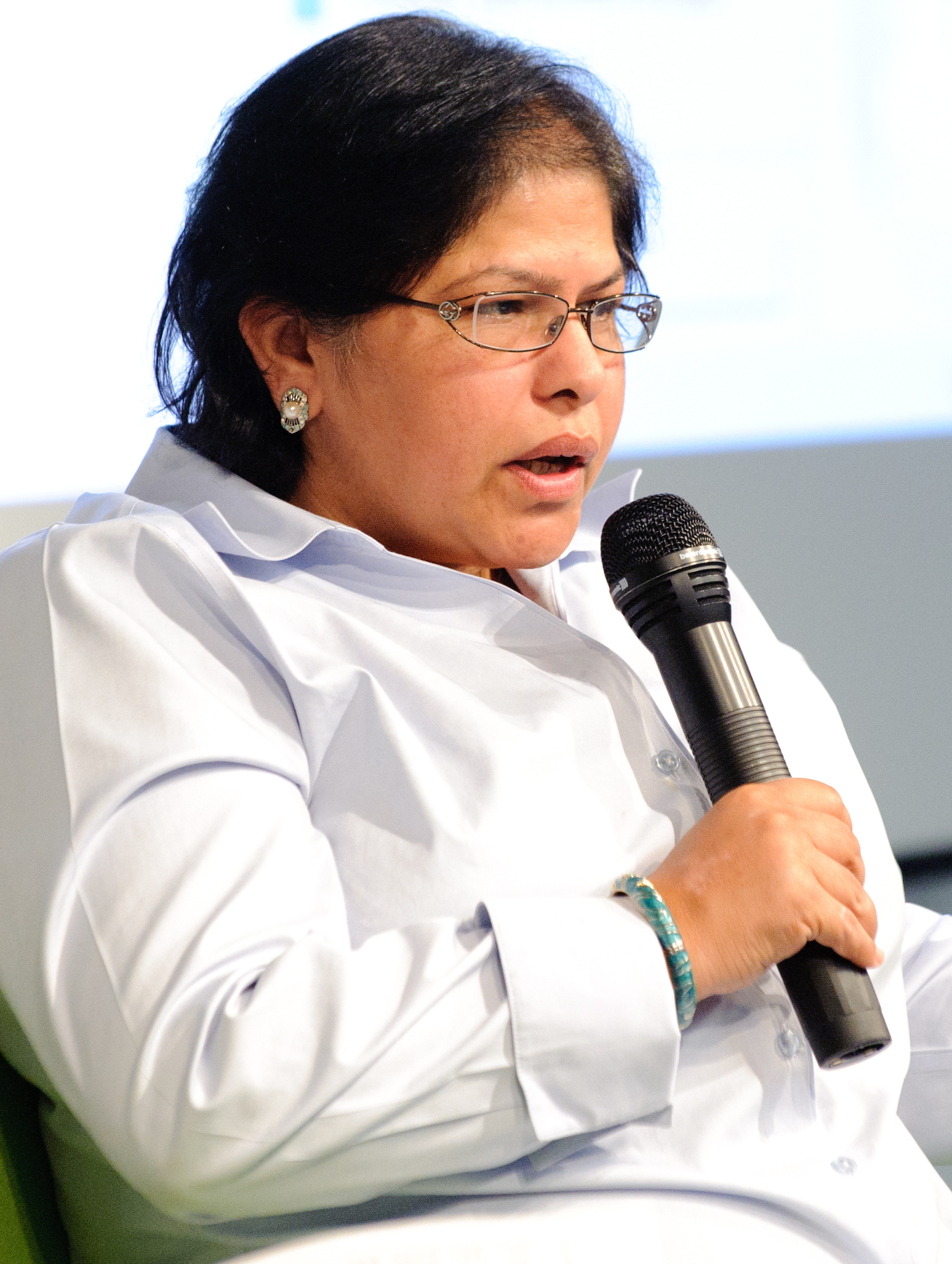
Ayesha Siddiqa is a Pakistani military scientist.
