= Renee Marlin-Bennett =

American political scientists (born 1959)

Renee Marlin-Bennett (born September 29, 1959), is a professor of Political Science at Johns Hopkins University. Her research on global problems probes power, information flows, borders, and bodies. The research draws upon approaches from international theory, pragmatism, international political sociology, and global political economy. Early in her career, her focus was on the evolution of rules that order global practices as well as those that provide the basis for disorder. She has examined substantive areas such as trade, intellectual property, information, and privacy to examine how contestation, rhetorical frames, and path dependence contribute to development of global orders.

Her current research on global problems focuses on instances of power and how they can congeal into governance or disruption of governance, especially as Information Age technologies change who and what can be an actor in global politics. This stream of research includes analysis of politics online and of global sites within cyberspace as opportunities for complicating our understanding of the practices of global politics. She also researches this theme of power instances by exploring the relation between the embodied human and global practices, the politics of borders, and technologies and art in global affairs.

== Biography ==
=== Early life and education ===
Marlin-Bennett earned her B.A. cum laude in international relations from Pomona College and her doctorate in political science from the Massachusetts Institute of Technology, where she was a student of Hayward R. Alker. She was also mentored by Edward E. Azar of the University of Maryland.

=== Career ===
From 1987 to 2007, Marlin-Bennett served on the faculty of International Relations at the American University, School of International Service. At AU she also served as Director of the Division of International Politics and Foreign Policy, then the largest division of the School of International Service.

She served as the Editor-In-Chief of the Oxford Research Encyclopedia of International Studies (OREIS), a joint publication of Oxford University Press and the International Studies Association, from OREIS's launch in 2017 through 2019. Previously she had served as a General Editor of the predecessor to OREIS, the ISA Compendium Project (including International Studies Online), and had been involved with the project in leadership roles since 2006.

Marlin-Bennett has been a professor of Political Science at Johns Hopkins University since 2007.

== Selected published works ==
- Food Fights: International Regimes and the Politics of Agricultural Trade Disputes (Gordon and Breach, 1993)
- Knowledge Power: Intellectual Property, Information, and Privacy (Lynne Rienner Publishers, 2004)
- Alker and IR: Global Studies in an Interconnected World, editor (Routledge, 2011)
- Science, Technology, and Art in International Affairs, co-editor (Routledge, 2019)
- Oxford Research Encyclopedia of International Studies, editor-in-chief (Oxford University Press, 2017-2019)
