= Ilhan Niaz =

Pakistani historian

Ilhan Niaz, (Urdu: الہان نیاز) born 1980, is a Pakistani historian and professor at Quaid-i-Azam University in Islamabad.

== Education and research ==
Niaz completed his post graduate work from Quaid-i-Azam University, Islamabad. He completed his MSc in history in 2003, M.Phil in 2004 and his PhD in 2009. The PhD thesis became the basis for his second book which won the KLF Award and the HEC Best Book Publication Award.

In his first book, An Inquiry into the Culture of Power of the Subcontinent, Niaz developed a theoretical framework that explains the rise and fall of states in South Asia. The core elements of this framework are a type of state (continental bureaucratic empire) that manifests three main properties in its organization. First, the state is the property of the ruler or the rulers. Second, the ruler(s) operate through hierarchical institutions (military, bureaucracy, priests). Third, they exercise power arbitrarily and due to the official ideology or religion are above lawful criticism. Niaz presents a macro-historical overview of South Asia from the Indus Valley civilization to near-contemporary India and Pakistan and demonstrates the elements of continuity in the behavior of ruling elites over this period. He argues that since independence from Britain in 1947, India and Pakistan have slowly gone back to their primordial cultures of power that are delusional, arbitrary, ideocratic and treat the state as a personal estate. In his second book, The Culture of Power and Governance of Pakistan, 1947-2008, Niaz provides a detailed study of Pakistan's experience of behavioral regression since 1947. The framework developed in the first book is applied and adjusted in light of the archival material found in Islamabad.

Niaz's book, Old World Empires: Cultures of Power and Governance in Eurasia, was published by Routledge, New York in April 2014, and is available in India and Pakistan in an Oxford University Press edition released in November 2014. In this book, Niaz advances the framework developed in his works on South Asia and Pakistan and applies it to India, China, Persia, Continental Europe, the Ottoman Empire, Russia, Japan, and the United Kingdom. Niaz takes a long-view of historical development that combines deterministic factors such as geography and environment with variable factors such as leadership, politics, and ideology, to provide an overview of how states developed structurally and in terms of mentality. This is the first instance of a Pakistani historian developing a philosophical framework for understanding global macro-history.

== Career ==
Since 2009, Niaz has been an associate professor of History at Quaid-i-Azam University (QAU) in Islamabad. His teaching interests include historiography, Pakistan and world history. He has published numerous articles and book reviews.

== Award ==
- 2011: Karachi Literature Festival (KLF) award for best non-fiction in English.
- 2013: Third Higher Education Commission of Pakistan Outstanding Research Awards, winner for Best Book Publication The Culture of Power and Governance of Pakistan, 1947-2008 in Social Sciences, Arts and Humanities, for 2010.
- 2016: Fifth Higher Education Commission of Pakistan, Outstanding Research awards, winner for Best Book Publication Old World Empires: Cultures of Power and Governance in Eurasia, in Social Sciences, for 2013–14.
- 2022: Eights Higher Education Commission of Pakistan (HEC-P) Research Award in the fields of Social Sciences, Arts and Humanities, Law, Education, Management, and Public Policy.

== Books ==
- An Inquiry into the Culture of Power of the Subcontinent Islamabad: Alhamara, 2006.
- The Culture of Power and Governance of Pakistan (1947-2008), Karachi: Oxford University Press, 2010.
- Old World Empires: Cultures of Power and Governance in Eurasia, New York: Routledge, 2014 & Karachi: Oxford University Press, 2014.
- State and society in British India : institutional development and the imperial legacy, London: I.B. Tauris, 2017.
- The state during the British Raj : imperial governance in South Asia 1700-1947, Karachi: Oxford University Press, 2019.
- Downfall: Lessons for Our Final Century, Islamabad: Centre for Strategic and Contemporary Research (CSCR), 2022.
