= L. H. M. Ling =

American academic (1955–2018)

- Born: November 14, 1955
- Died: October 1, 2018 (aged 62)
- Occupation: Professor
- Known for: Worldism political theory

Academic background
- Education: Wellesley, MIT

Academic work
- Discipline: International relations
- Sub-discipline: Postcolonialism
- Institutions: The New School

L. H. M. "Lily" Ling (14 November 1955 – 1 October 2018) was a political theorist and scholar whose work focused around the theory of worldism within international relations. Much of her work draws from storytelling, the arts, and non-Western culture to present alternative versions of historical analysis of global affairs. She was Professor of International Affairs at The New School at the time of her death.

== Biography ==
She graduated from Wellesley College, and from Massachusetts Institute of Technology with a Ph.D. She held academic positions at University of Texas at Austin, Syracuse University, Cornell University, and International Institute of Social Studies before joining the faculty at The New School in 2002 as an associate professor with the Graduate Program in International Affairs. She was an editorial board member for Politics & Gender and for International Political Sociology, and an associate editor for International Feminist Journal of Politics.

In 2018, she was awarded the Eminent Scholar distinction by the Feminist Theory and Gender Studies section of the International Studies Association. Ling died on 1 October 2018, of stroke complications.

== Worldism ==
Ling was the lead advocate for worldism, a theory of international relations. Worldism posits that the dominant geopolitical order, defined as the Westphalian world/Western IR, is a singular social construction that interacts competitively and creatively with 'other worlds' – other social and political orders. The theory itself blends together insights from Taoism, feminism, postcolonialism, and social constructivism to critique the militaristic focus of contemporary international relations and realist analysis of it.

Doaism's yin-yang diagram, a physical representation of the dialectic basis for worldism

The theory bases itself in Daoist dialectics to complicate the totality of Western IR and pose it as the yang element within a dialectic construction. In comparison, Ling draws upon the arts and soft power to represent yin. Together, both "co-create, co-govern, and co-exercise power." Ling encourages others to explore within the creative power of yin to challenge the yang of dominant IR narratives to create new worlds, thus fulfilling the prophecy of worldism in the dialogue of various worlds within one another.

== Publications ==
=== Books ===
- Postcolonial International Relations: Conquest and Desire between Asia and the West (London: Palgrave Macmillan, 2002)
- Seductions of Empire: Complicity, Desire, and Insecurity in Contemporary World Politics (forthcoming), co-authored with Anna M. Agathangelou (York University).
- The House of IR: From Family Power Politics to the Poisies of Worldism, co-authored with Anna M. Agathangelou (Wiley on behalf of The International Studies Association, 2004)
- The Dao of World Politics: Towards a Post-Westphalian, Worldist International Relations (Routledge, 2014)
- Imagining World Politics: Sihar & Shenya, A Fable for Our Times (Routledge, 2014)
- India China: Rethinking Borders and Security, with Adriana Erthal Abdenur, Payal Banerjee, Nimmi Kurian, Mahendra P. Lama, and Li Bo. (University of Michigan Press, 2016, ISBN 978-0-472-13006-1).

=== Other publications ===
- "The Kitsch of War", International Affairs Working Paper 2005-02, March 2005

Ling, L.H.M (2017) “World Politics in Colour” in Millennium: Journal of International Studies, Vol. 45(3) pp. 473–491. Accessible: https://doi.org/10.1177/0305829817703192

Ling's publications have appeared in International Feminist Journal of Politics, International Studies Quarterly, International Studies Review, Journal of Peace Research, Millennium, positions: east Asia cultures critique, Review of International Political Economy, Review of Politics, as well as various edited volumes.
