= Nasim Zehra =

Pakistani journalist and writer (born 1959)

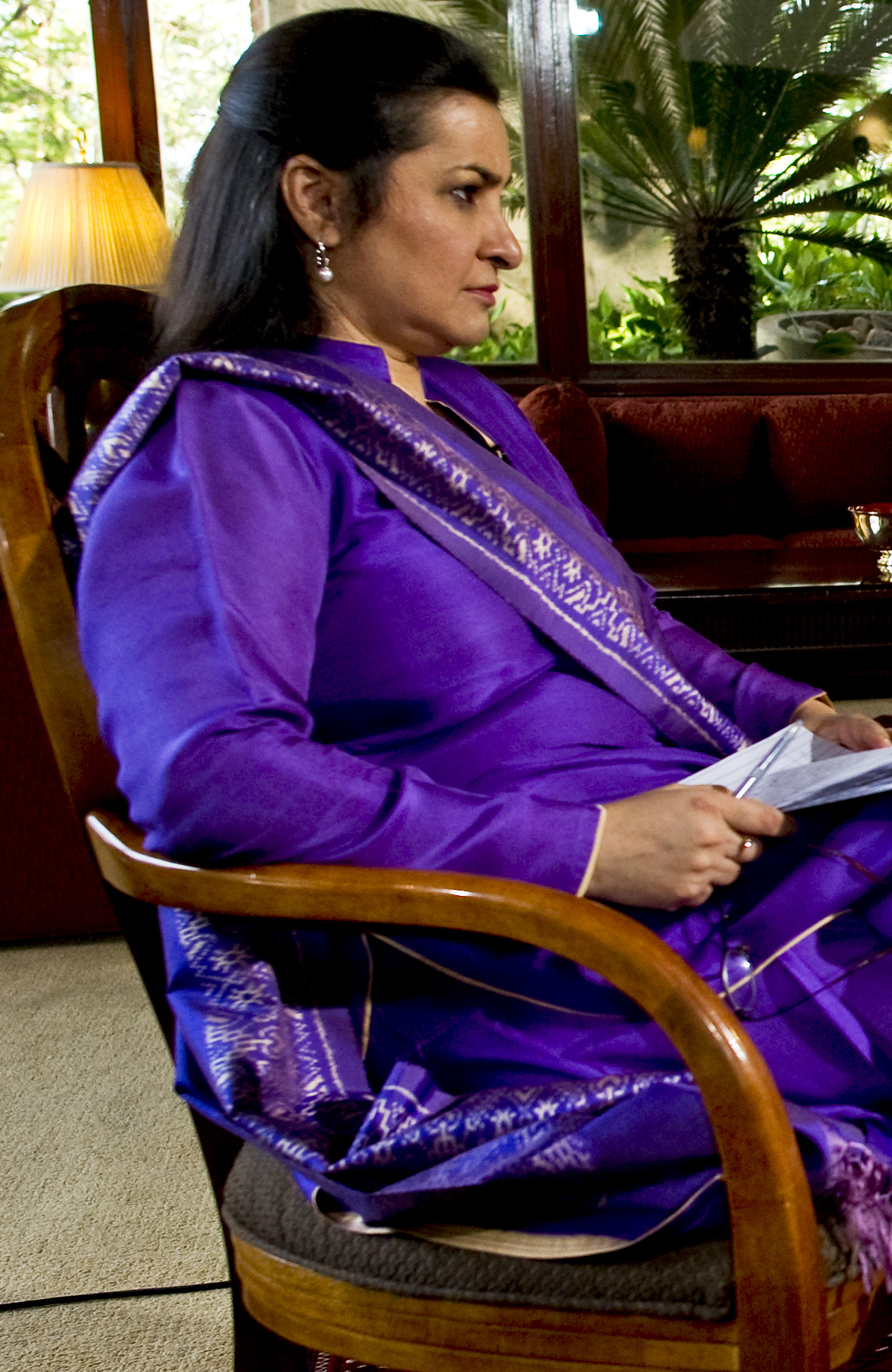
- Nasim Zehra in 2010
- Born: 8 January 1959 (age 67); Lahore, Punjab, Pakistan
- Citizenship: Pakistani
- Education: Fletcher School of Law and Diplomacy, Quaid-e-Azam University
- Occupations: Television Journalist; Frequent TV commentator on national security in Pakistan; Author of books
- Years active: 2000 - present
- Employer: 24 Digital (2015-present)
- Notable work: Her book on Kargil War in 1999 between India and Pakistan
- Relatives: Juggan Kazim (PTV anchorperson) (niece)
- Awards: Agahi Award for excellence in journalism in 2016

Nasim Zehra (Urdu: نسیم زہرہ) is a Pakistani journalist and writer who hosts a primetime current affairs talkshow on Channel 24.

== Education and career ==
Zehra studied business at the Quaid-e-Azam University, Pakistan and later studied diplomacy at the Fletcher School at Tufts University in 1989. She worked as a development practitioner, working with the Canadian International Development Agency and Swiss Agency for Development and Cooperation. Zehra served as a visiting lecturer at the School of Advanced International Studies at the Johns Hopkins University in 2006, and later at the Quaid-e-Azam University in 2010.

She joined Dunya News in November 2008 as an anchor and hosted the TV program Policy Matters until February 2013. During that time, she interviewed several national and global leaders including Michael Mullen. In April 2013, she moved to Capital TV and became the channel's current affairs editor. She left Capital TV in October 2014. In September 2015, she joined National University of Sciences and Technology as a visiting professor and remained in that position until February 2016. In October 2014, she joined Channel 24. Naseem Zehra has regularly written as a newspaper columnist for Dubai-based Gulf News, UAE-based Khaleej Times and Saudi-Arabia-based Arab News.

In 2018, she released the book From Kargil to the coup: Events that shook Pakistan, which chronicles the context of the Kargil conflict and its consequences on India–Pakistan relations. At the book launch ceremony, a panel of journalists and people familiar with foreign policy and military affairs of Pakistan discussed the book including journalists Arif Nizami, Sohail Warraich and former Foreign Secretary Salman Bashir.

== Top 10 female journalist in Pakistan ==
On 8 March 2023, The Friday Times, a major newspaper in Pakistan published its 'List of Top Female Journalists in Pakistan'. Nasim Zehra was included in the list and reportedly was quoted as saying:

"With abiding power play and almost endless political chaos, being a journalist in Pakistan is like being on a roller coaster. It's a tough, trying but rewarding space to be in with self-scrutiny keeping you on your feet 24/7. We have to deal with the toxic fallout in this horribly mindless and polarised politics."

== Awards and recognition ==
Agahi Award for excellence in journalism - 'Journalist of the Year' (Most Credible Anchor of the Year) (2016) given by the Agahi Foundation in Pakistan, a non-profit organization.

== Bibliography ==
- From Kargil to the coup : events that shook Pakistan, 2018.

== See also ==
- List of Pakistani journalists
- Dunya News
