= Quaid-i-Azam University =

Public University in Pakistan

- جامعہ قائداعظم
- Former name: University of Islamabad
- Motto: وَمَن يُؤْتَ الْحِكْمَةَ فَقَدْ أُوتِيَ خَيْرًا كَثِيرًا (Arabic)
- Motto in English: "And he to whom wisdom is granted receiveth indeed a benefit overflowing"
- Type: Public
- Established: 22 July 1967; 59 years ago
- Academic affiliations: Higher Education Commission
- Chancellor: President of Pakistan
- Vice-Chancellor: Dr. Zafar Nawaz Jaspal
- Students: 13,000
- Undergraduates: 6,500+
- Postgraduates: 3,500+
- Doctoral students: 3,000+
- Location: Islamabad, 45320, Pakistan; 33°44′50″N 73°08′20″E
- Campus: 690 ha; Urban
- Colours: Blue and white
- Website: www.qau.edu.pk

Quaid-i-Azam University (QAU), (Note: Urdu: جامعہ قائداعظم) founded as the University of Islamabad, is a public research university in Islamabad, Pakistan. Founded as the University of Islamabad in 1967, it was initially dedicated to postgraduate study, but later expanded to an interdisciplinary university offering both undergraduate and postgraduate education. The university became known by its current name in 1976.

== Overview ==
As of 2015, QAU has grown into the largest university in Islamabad with a total enrollment exceeding 13,000 students. The university is on a 6.9 km^{2} (1700 acre) (campus on the foothills of the Margalla. Divided into four faculties and nine affiliated research institutes, QAU is among Pakistan's largest and highest-ranked universities.

The university has collaborated with international institutions, including the United Nations, University of Tokyo and the ICTP. It counts several public figures and intellectuals among its current and former faculty, researchers, or alumni since its establishment, including Maleeha Lodhi, Nasim Zehra, Shamshad Akhtar, Suhail Zubairy, Abdul Rashid Ghazi, Farzana Aslam, Tasneem Zehra and Salma Zahid.

The university is currently led by Dr. Zafar Nawaz Jaspal, and has four different faculties and 38 departments, institutes, schools and centers.

== History ==
The University of Islamabad was established on 22 July 1967 by the Government of Pakistan. It was renamed as Quaid-i-Azam University in honor of Quaid-i-Azam Mohammad Ali Jinnah, the founder of Pakistan, in 1976, the centennial of his birth. However, the spelling of the university's name was kept different ("i" was used instead of "e" for the ezāfe that links the two words in Jinnah's title "Quaid-e-Azam").

The university offered teaching and research programs for PhD and MPhil degrees upon its founding and later offered Master's programs. The university now also offers undergraduate programs in both evening and morning shifts.

=== Computing and Department of Computer Sciences ===
In the early 1970s, Quaid-i-Azam University (then known as the University of Islamabad) established one of Pakistan's first academic computing facilities, known as the Computer Centre. The centre was equipped with an IBM System/360 Model 30 mainframe (installed in 1971) to provide centralised computational support for scientific research, theoretical physics, and numerical data processing for university departments and national research bodies. The university also launched short courses for COBOL, RPG and Assembler languages.

In 1976, the university transitioned the facility into a formal academic department, becoming the first educational institution in Pakistan to introduce a postgraduate degree programme in computing with the launch of its Master of Science (MSc) in Computer Science. This programme served as an early pipeline for computer science educators and systems professionals prior to the establishment of dedicated computer science faculties at other Pakistani universities during the 1980s.

== Faculties and departments ==
Quaid-i-Azam University consists of four faculties. The following departments, institutes, and schools work under these faculties.

=== Faculty of Natural Sciences ===
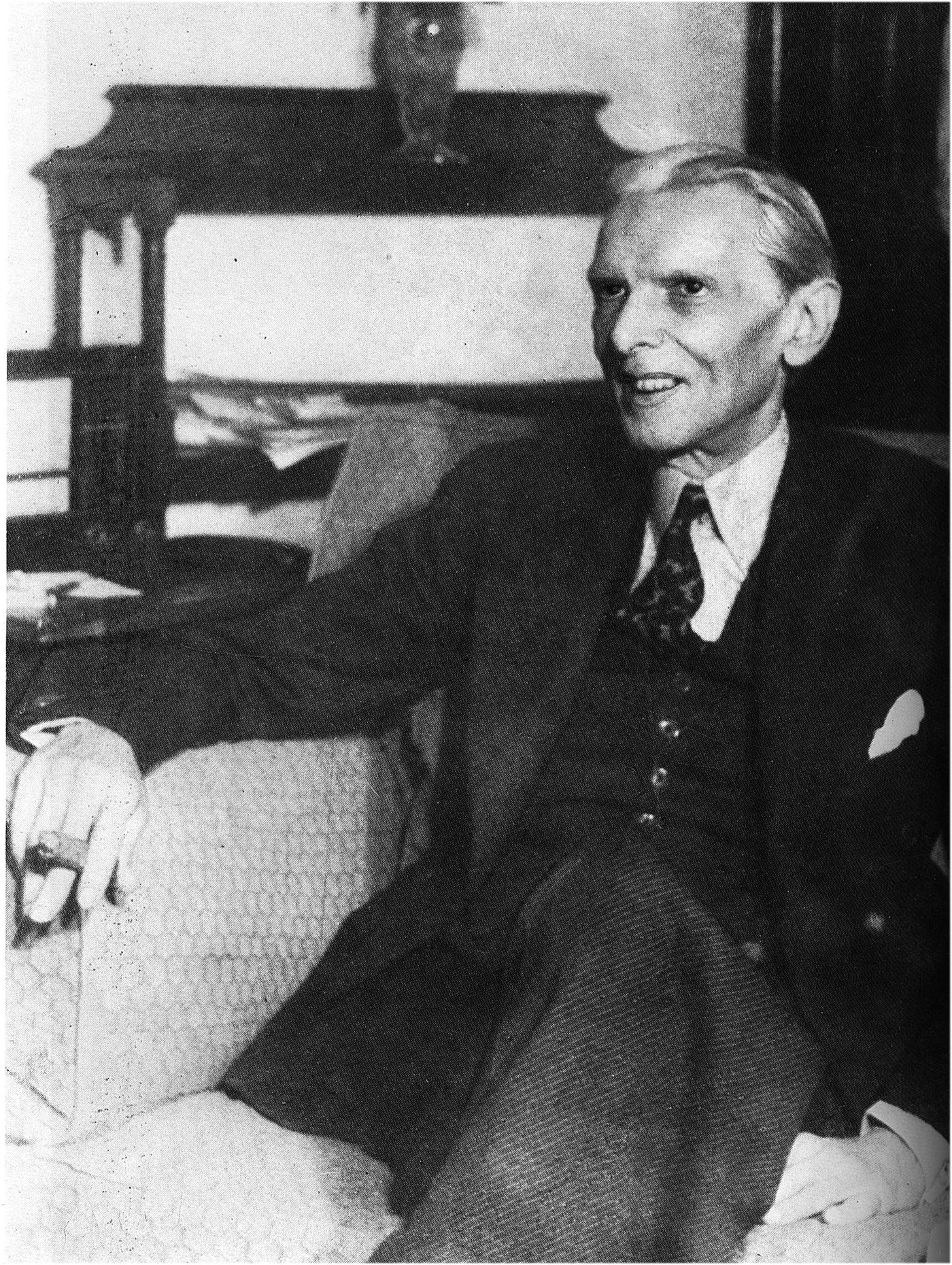
The university was renamed in honor of Quaid-e-Azam Muhammad Ali Jinnah (1876-1948), founder of Pakistan.

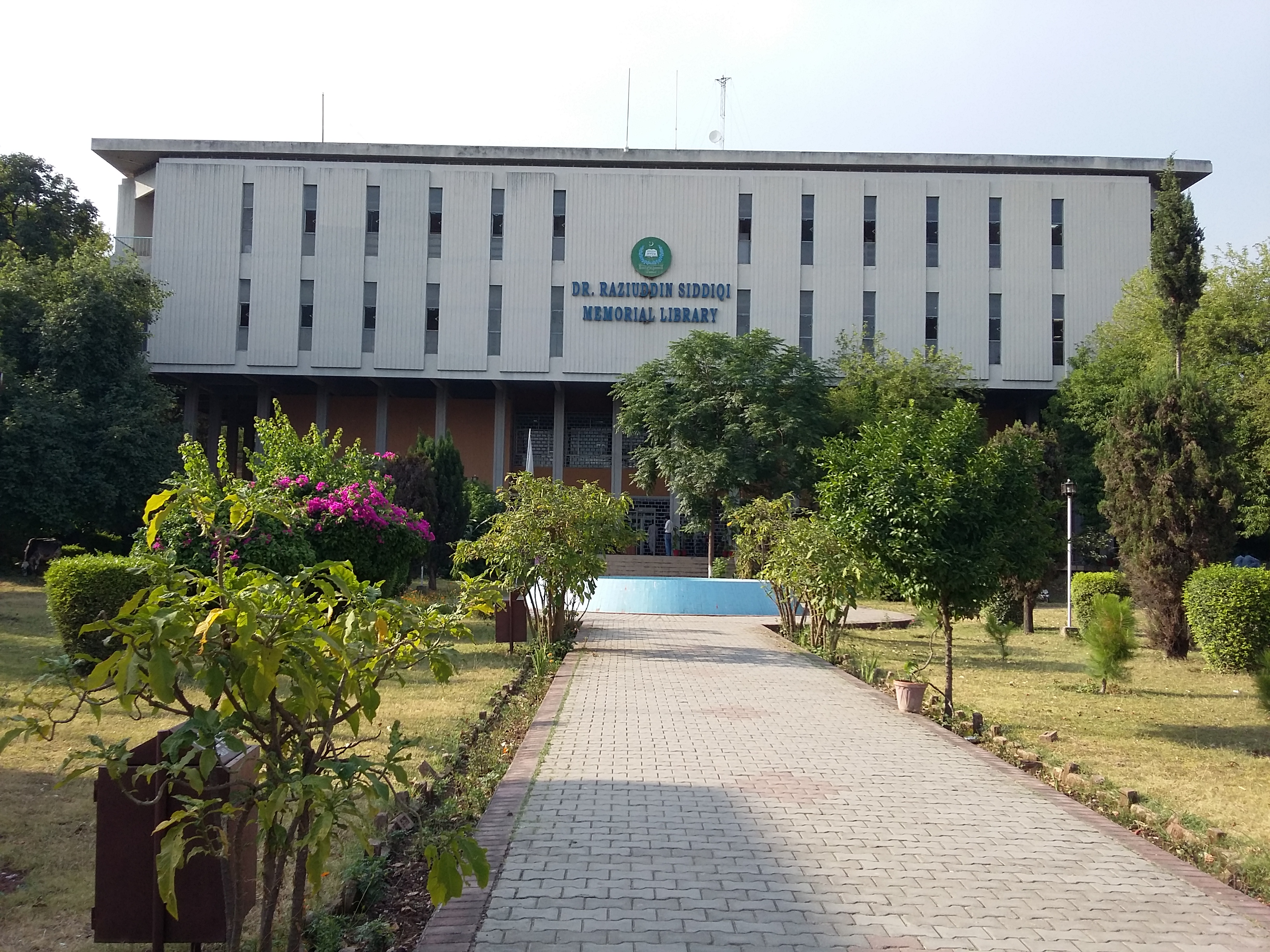
Quaid-e-Azam University Islamabad

- Department of Chemistry
- Department of Computer Science (Ranked 201st Worldwide)
- Department of Earth Sciences
- Department of Electronics
- Institute of Information Technology (Ranked 201st Worldwide)
- Department of Mathematics (Ranked 225th Worldwide)
- Department of Physics (Ranked 225th Worldwide)
- Department of Statistics

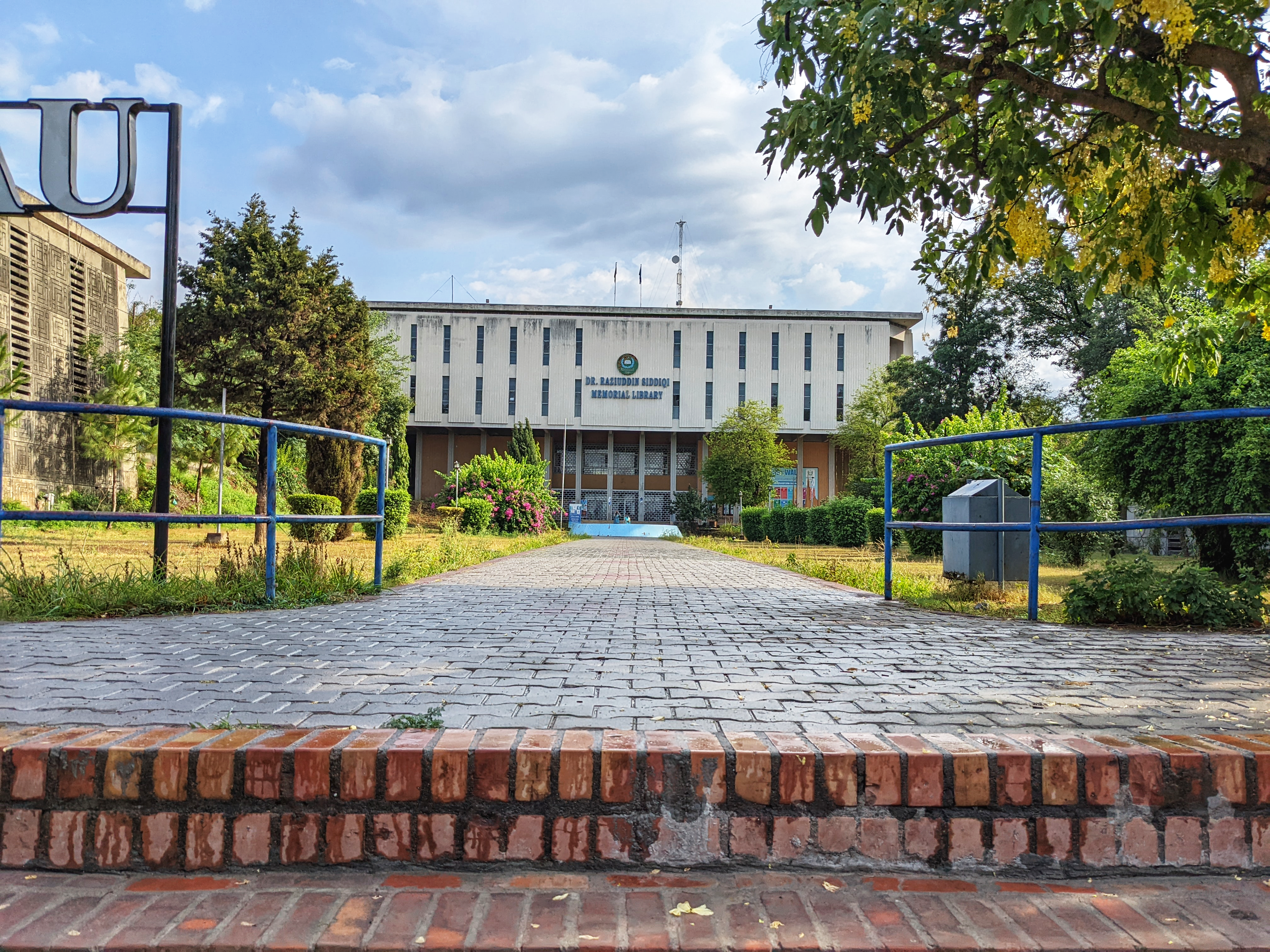
Dr. Muhammad Raziuddin Siddiqui Memorial Library (Main Library) at Quaid-i-Azam University

=== Faculty of Social Sciences ===
- School of Law
- Quaid-i-Azam School of Management Sciences (QASMS)
- Department of Anthropology
- School of Sociology
- Department of Linguistics
- Department of Defence & Strategic Studies
- School of Economics
- Department of History
- School of Politics and International Relations
- Taxila institute of Asian civilizations
- Department of Psychology

=== Faculty of Biological Sciences ===
- National Center for Bioinformatics
- Department of Animal Sciences
- Department of Biochemistry
- Department of Microbiology
- Department of Plant Sciences (Ranked 125th Worldwide)
- Department of Environmental Sciences
- QAU School of Medicine
- Department of Pharmacy
- Department of Biotechnology

=== Faculty of Medical Science ===
- Al-Shifa Eye Trust Hospital Rawalpindi
- Army Forces Post Graduate Medical Institute
- Health Services Academy, Islamabad
- Federal Medical & Dental College
- Quaid e Azam Postgraduate Medical College, PIMS

=== Institutes ===
- Institute of Information & Technology
- National Institute of Historical and Cultural Research (NIHCR) Center for Excellence
- Saulat Institute of Pharmaceutical Sciences and Drug Research
- Center of Excellence in Gender Studies
- National Institute of Psychology
- National Institute of Pakistan Studies
- Area Study Centre for Africa, North & South America
- National Institute of Intelligence and Security Studies

Chairs

- Quaid-i-Azam Chair
- Benzair Bhutto Chair
- Rumi Chair

== Central Library ==
The university has central library (CL), named as DR. Raziuddin Siddiqi memorial library situated at the centre of the university campus and having total covered area is approximately 102,500 sq. ft. On 06-02-1999, the Central Library (CL) was renamed the Dr. Raziuddin Siddiqi Mermorial (DRSM) Library in honour of Dr. Raziuddin Siddiqi's illustrious and meritorious achievements as the founding Vice Chancellor of Quaid-i-Azam University. University offers DRSM Library services for faculty and students of the university.

== Rankings and reputation ==
University rankings

Global – Overall
- QS World: 354 (2026)
- THE World: 401–500
- USNWR Global: 381

Regional – Overall
- QS Asia: =84
- THE Asia: =137

National – Overall
- HEC National: 1

In the 2024 QS World University Rankings, the university was ranked 315th globally and 86th in Asia. The physics department is ranked 201st–250th, the mathematics department is ranked 150th–200th, the agriculture department is ranked 201st–250th. In the 2010 rankings, the university was ranked 6th in the natural science category, and was ranked 100th–200th in the 2007 and 2009 rankings.

Into the 2019 Higher Education Commission of Pakistan rankings, the university was ranked 1st in the general category. In the 2023 Times Higher Education World University Rankings, QAU was ranked 401st–500th.

== Notable alumni and faculty ==
1. Sajad Haider
2. Abdul Rashid Ghazi
3. Aasim Sajjad Akhtar
4. Abrar ul Haq
5. Hamza Ali Abbasi
6. Ahmed Hassan Dani
7. Akbar S. Ahmed
8. Alamgir Hashmi
9. Ansar Pervaiz
10. Arshad Sharif
11. Asghar Qadir
12. Fayyazuddin
13. Ismat Beg
14. Ishfaq Nadeem Ahmad
15. Irshad Hussain
16. Hareem Farooq
17. Ilhan Niaz
18. Khadija Mushtaq
19. Maliha Lodhi
20. Marriyum Aurangzeb
21. Mazhar Mahmood Qurashi
22. Muhammad Sharif
23. Muhammad Suhail Zubairy
24. Muhammad Imran Qadir
25. Nasim Zehra
26. Nargis Sethi
27. Nisar Ali Khan
28. Pervaiz Iqbal Cheema
29. Pervez Hoodbhoy
30. Qaiser Mushtaq
31. Qamar-uz-Zaman Chaudhry
32. Rana Mubashir
33. Zafarullah Khan
34. Raziuddin Siddiqui
35. Shamshad Akhtar
36. Shireen Mazari
37. Tahir Amin
38. Tasneem M. Shah
39. Zia Mian
40. Brigadier Anis Ahmed
41. Tariq Rahman
Notable Alumni

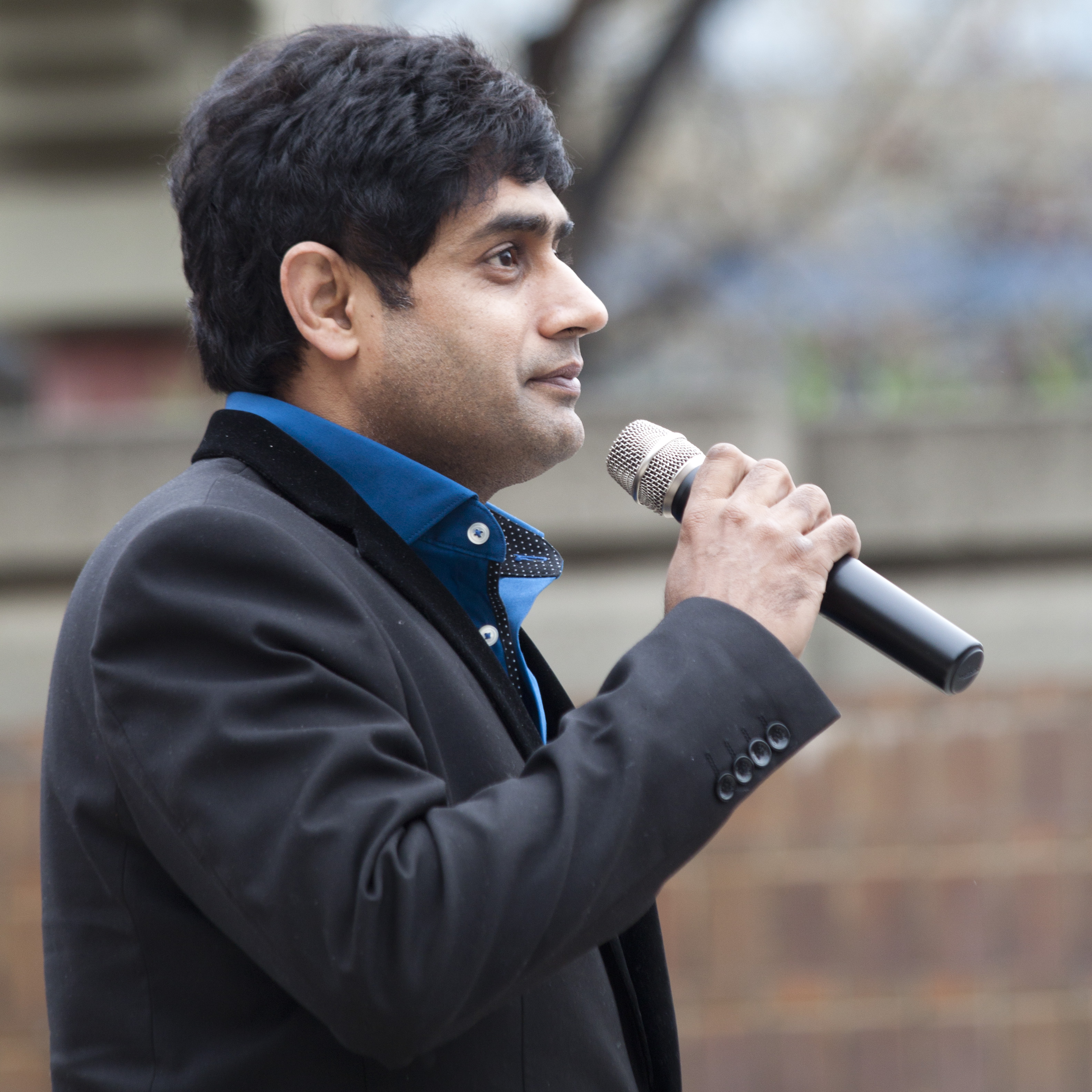
Abrar-ul-Haq is a Pakistani musician and politician.

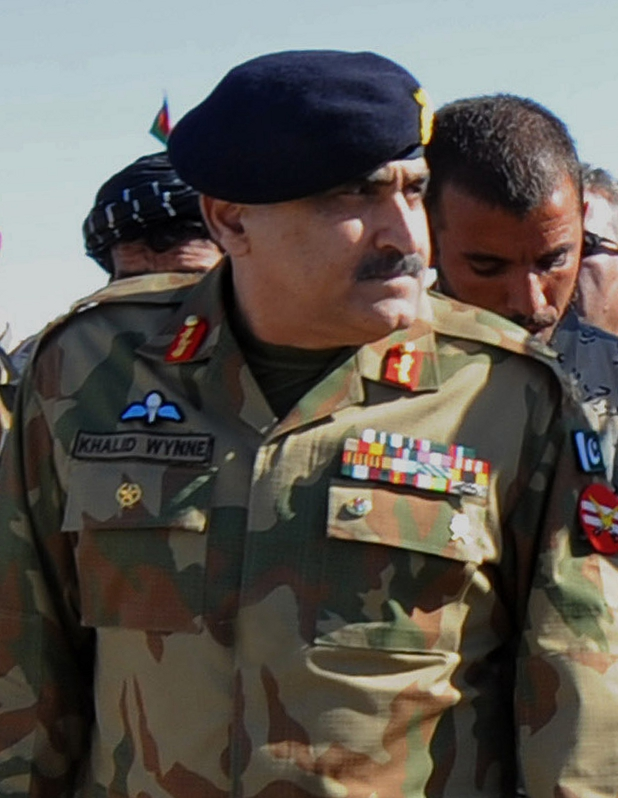
General Khalid Shameem Wynne was a retired Pakistani four-star general and former Chief of the General Staff.

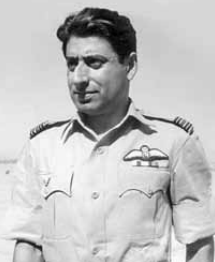
Sajad Haider was a former Pakistan Air Force officer.

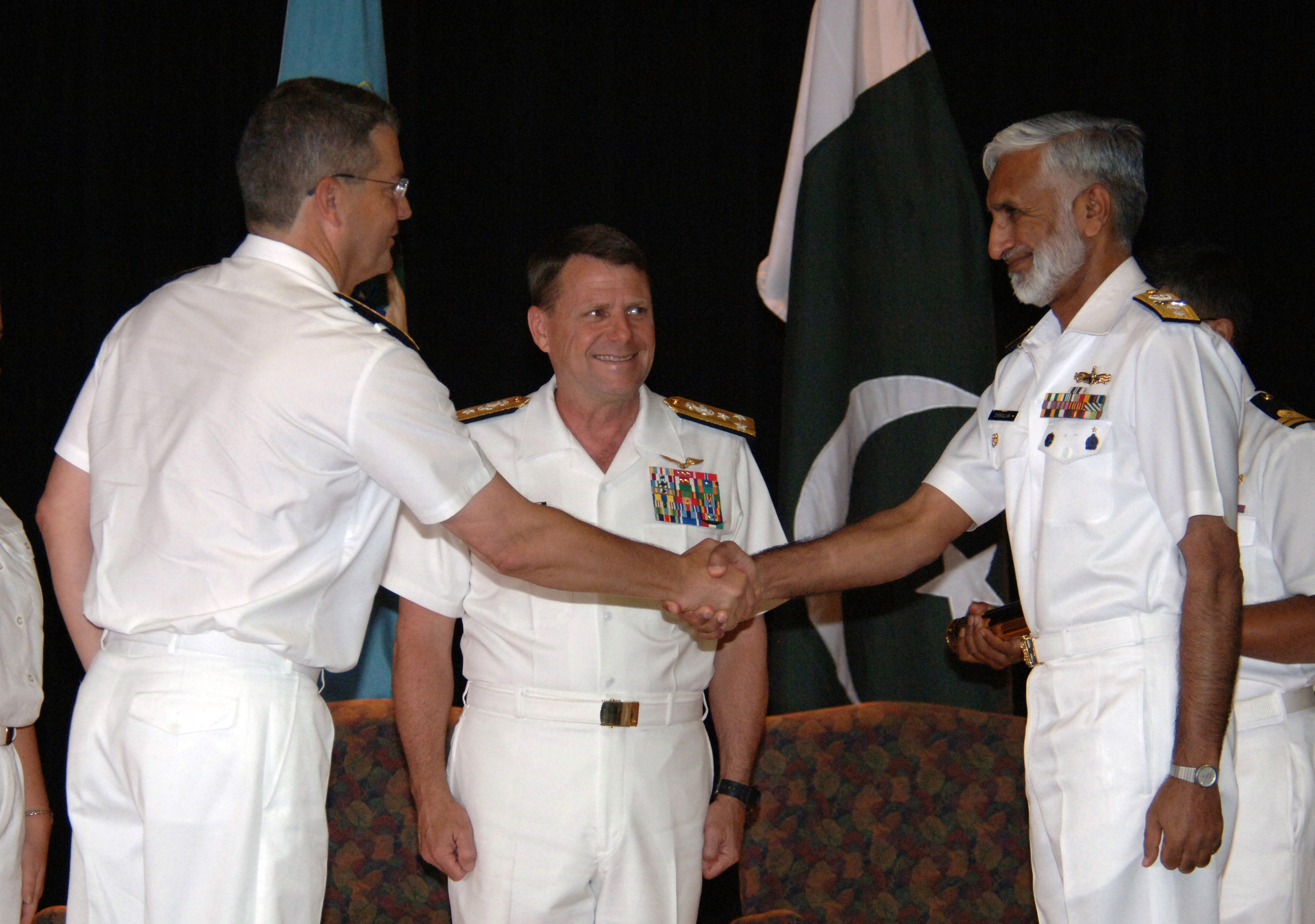
Muhammad Zakaullah was the former Chief of Naval Staff.

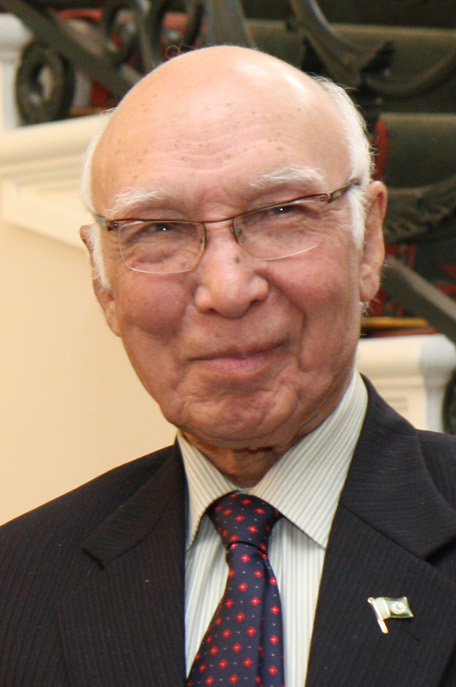
Sartaj Aziz was a Pakistani economist and a strategist who served as the Minister for Foreign Affairs.

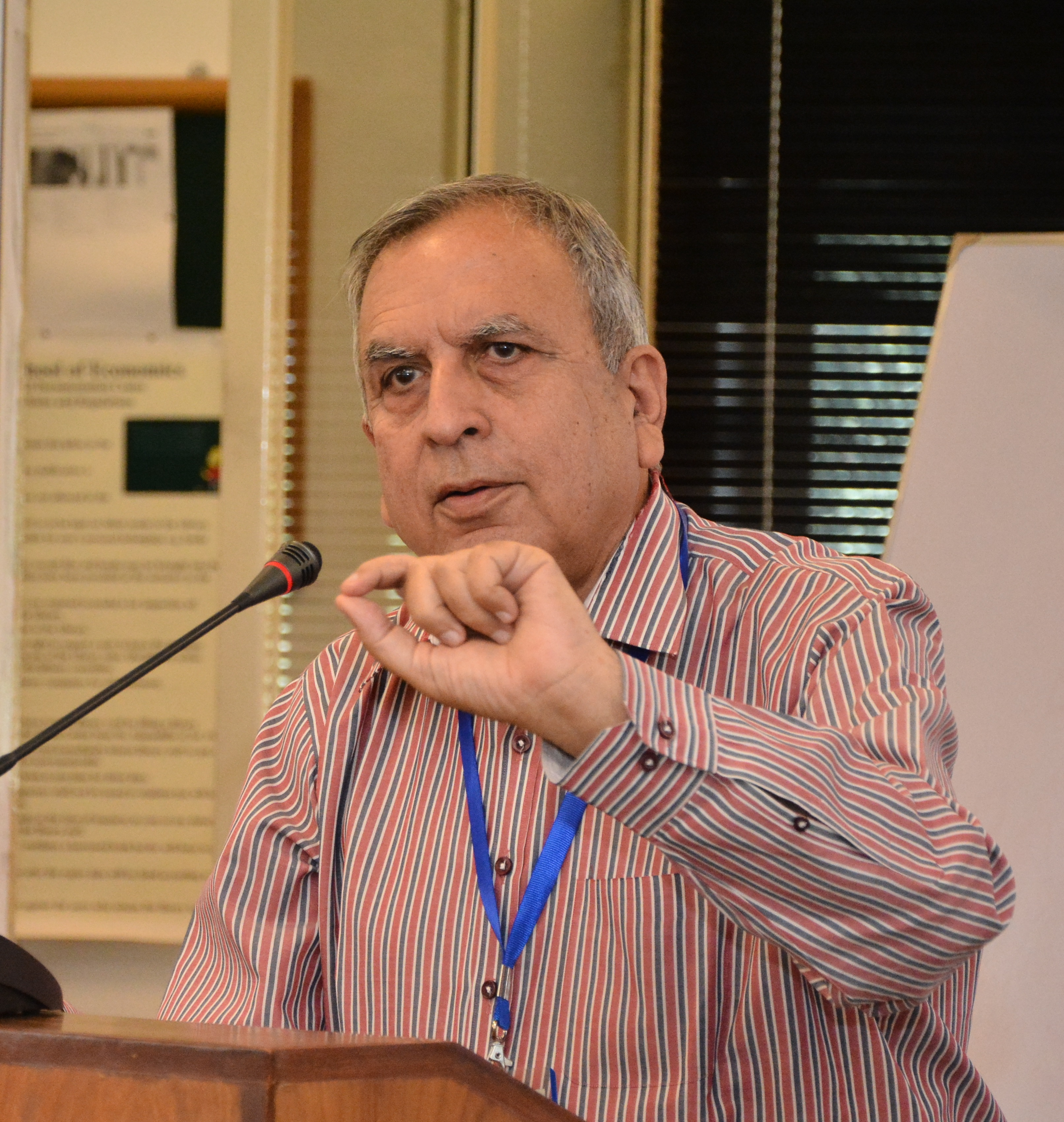
Ismat Beg is a mathematician, known for his work on multiple-criteria decision analysis and the fixed point.

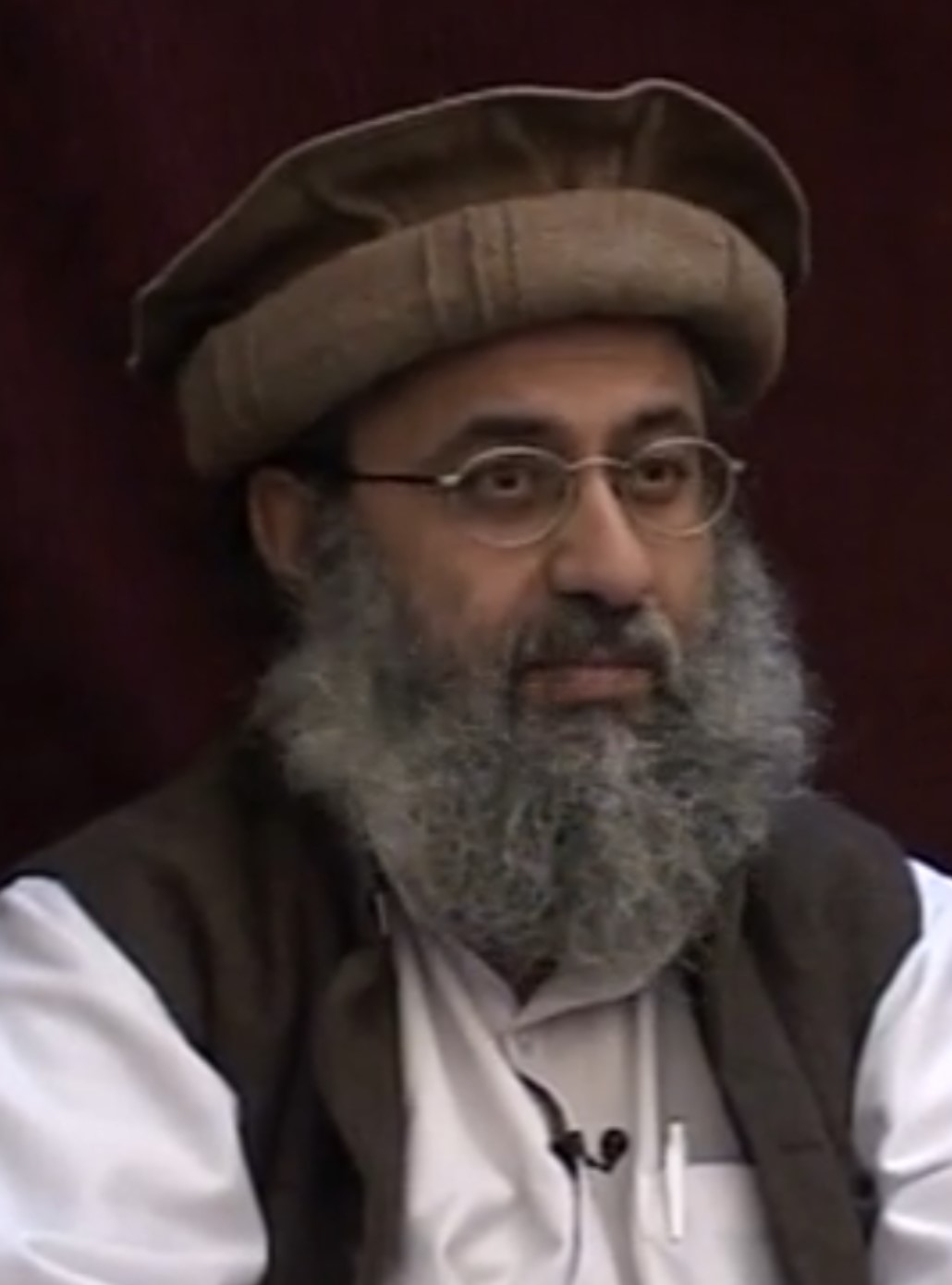
Abdul Rashid Ghazi was a Pakistani Islamic scholar and diplomat.

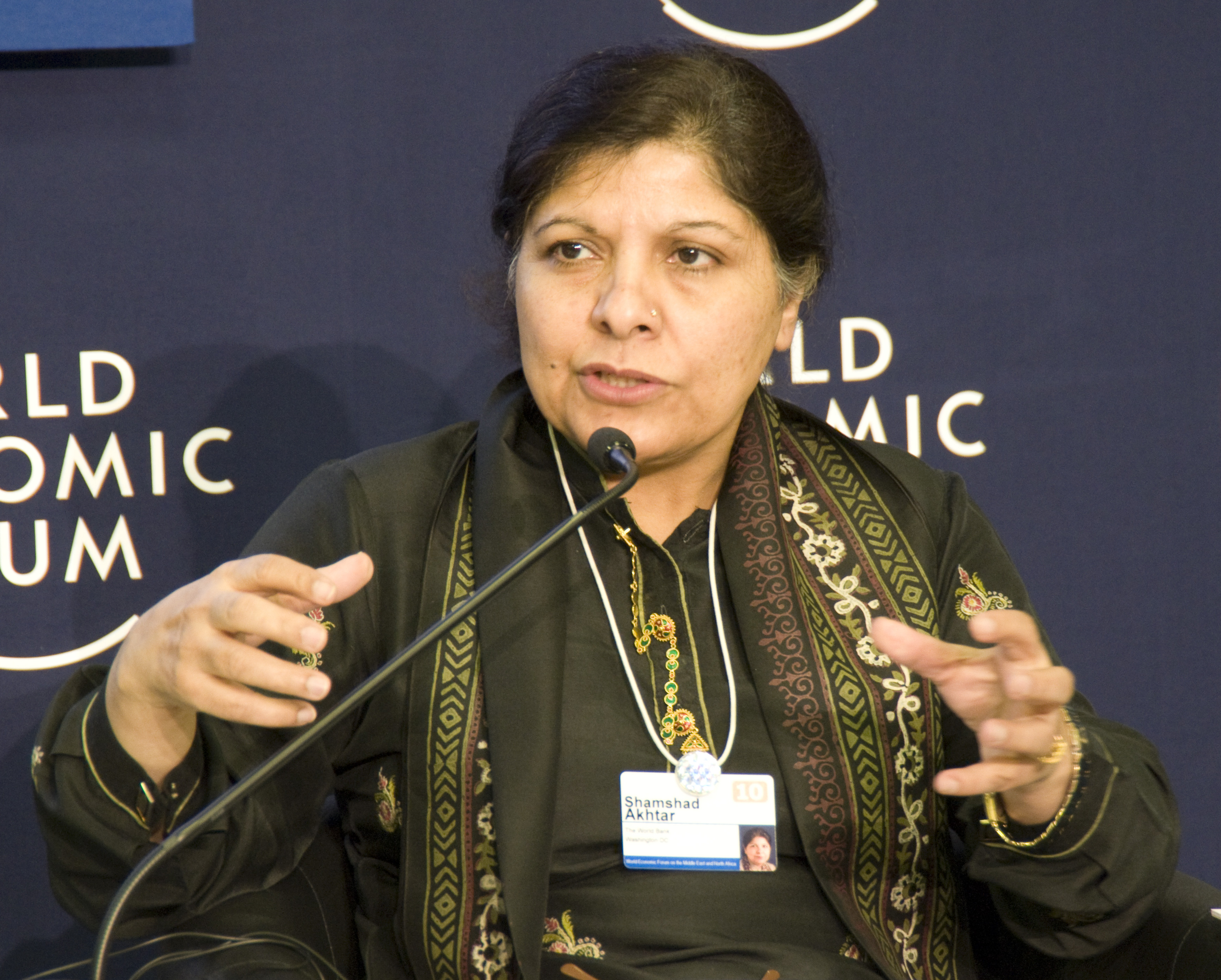
Shamshad Akhtar served as the vice president of the World Bank.

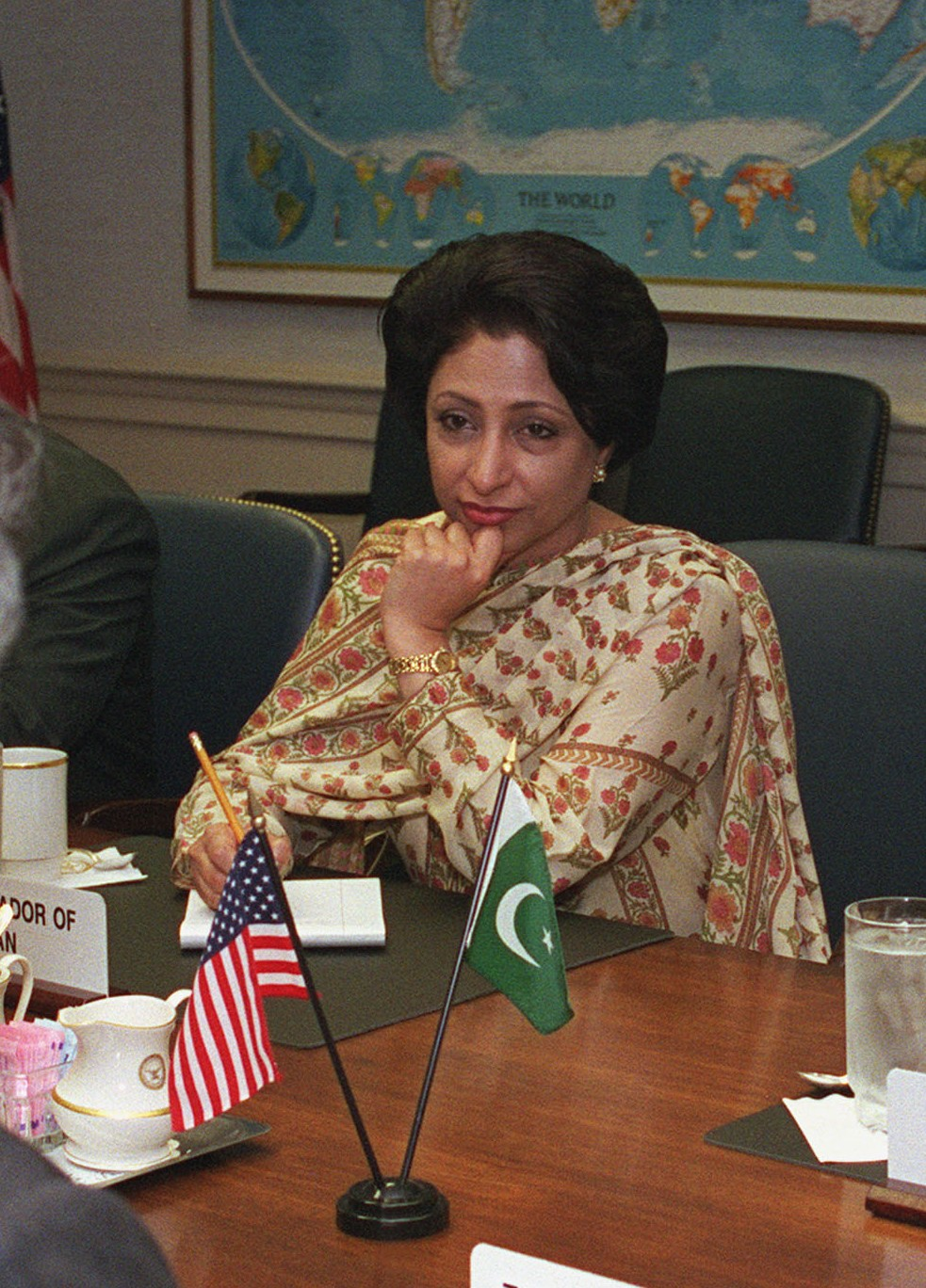
Dr. Maliha Lodhi is a leading Pakistani diplomat.

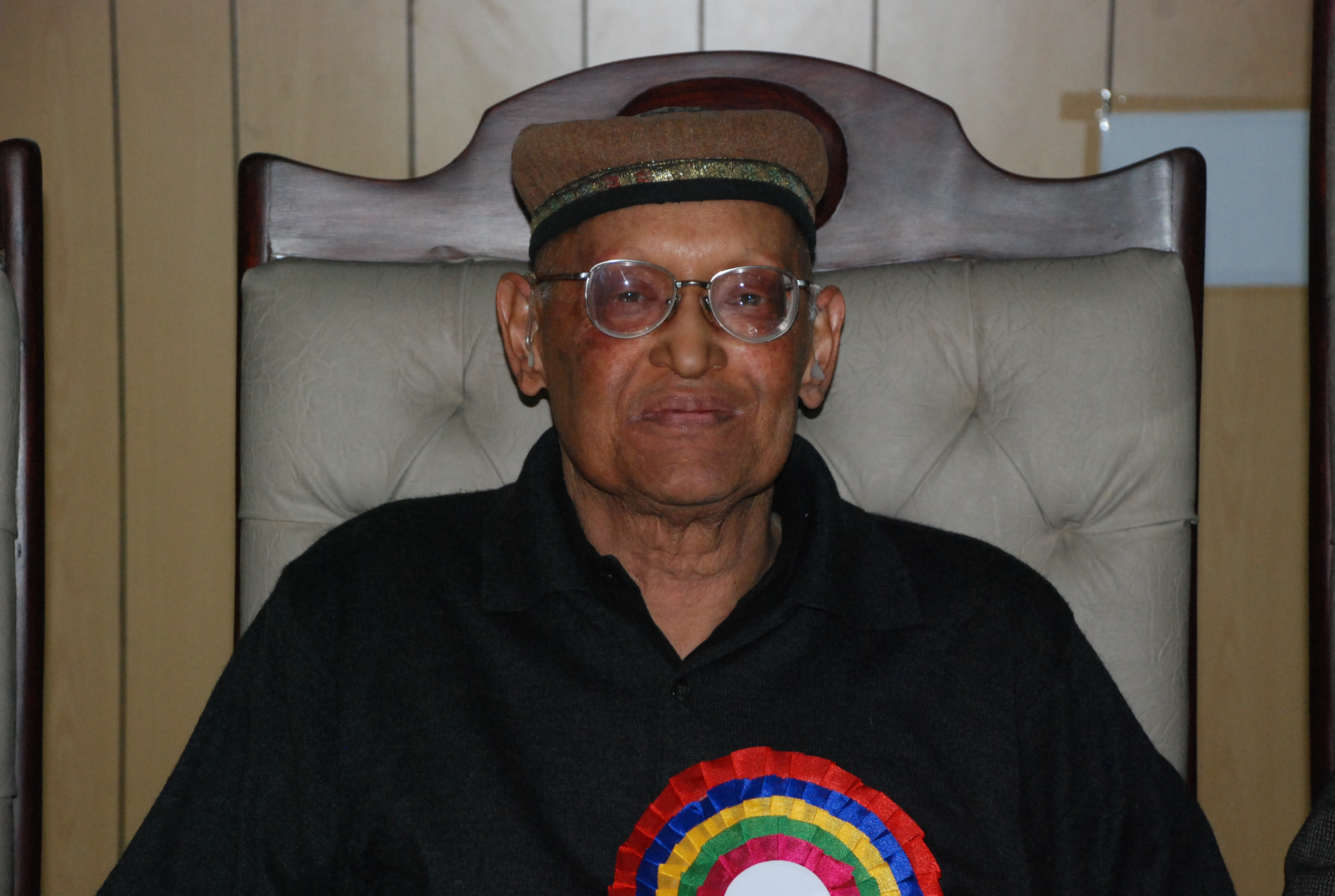
Asghar Qadir is a Pakistani mathematician and a prominent cosmologist.

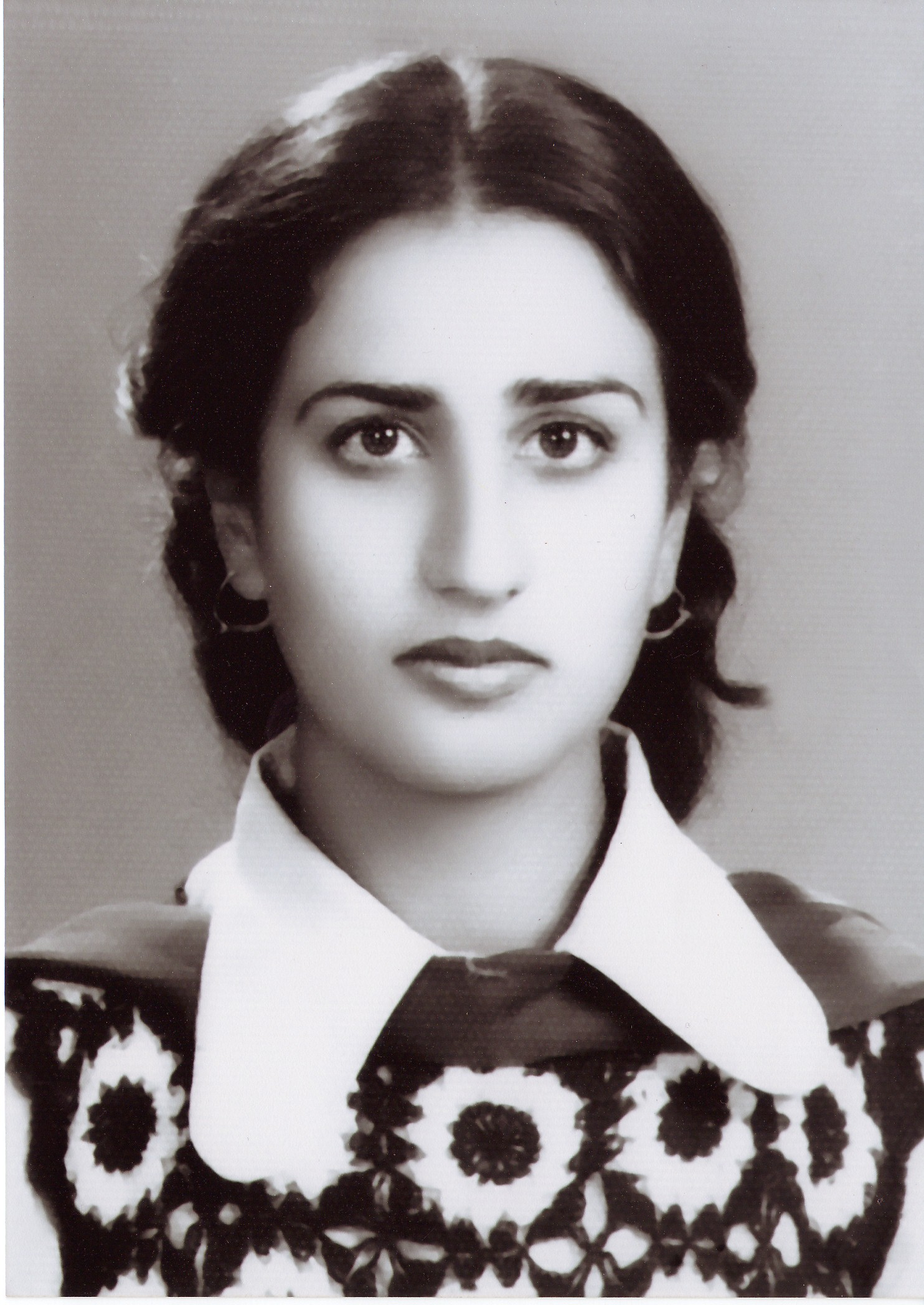
Naela Chohan is a Pakistani diplomat and women rights activist.

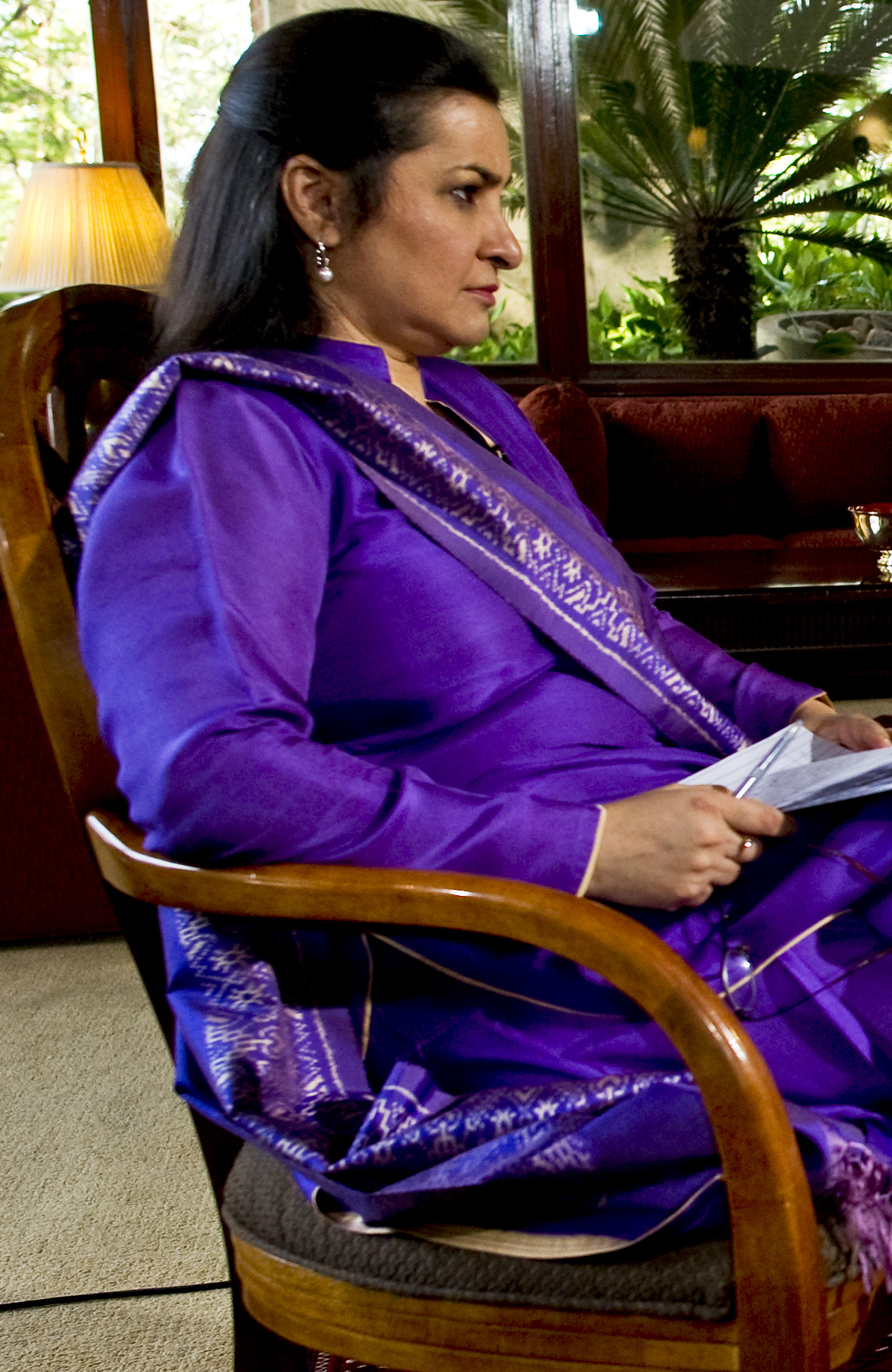
Nasim Zehra is a leading journalist.

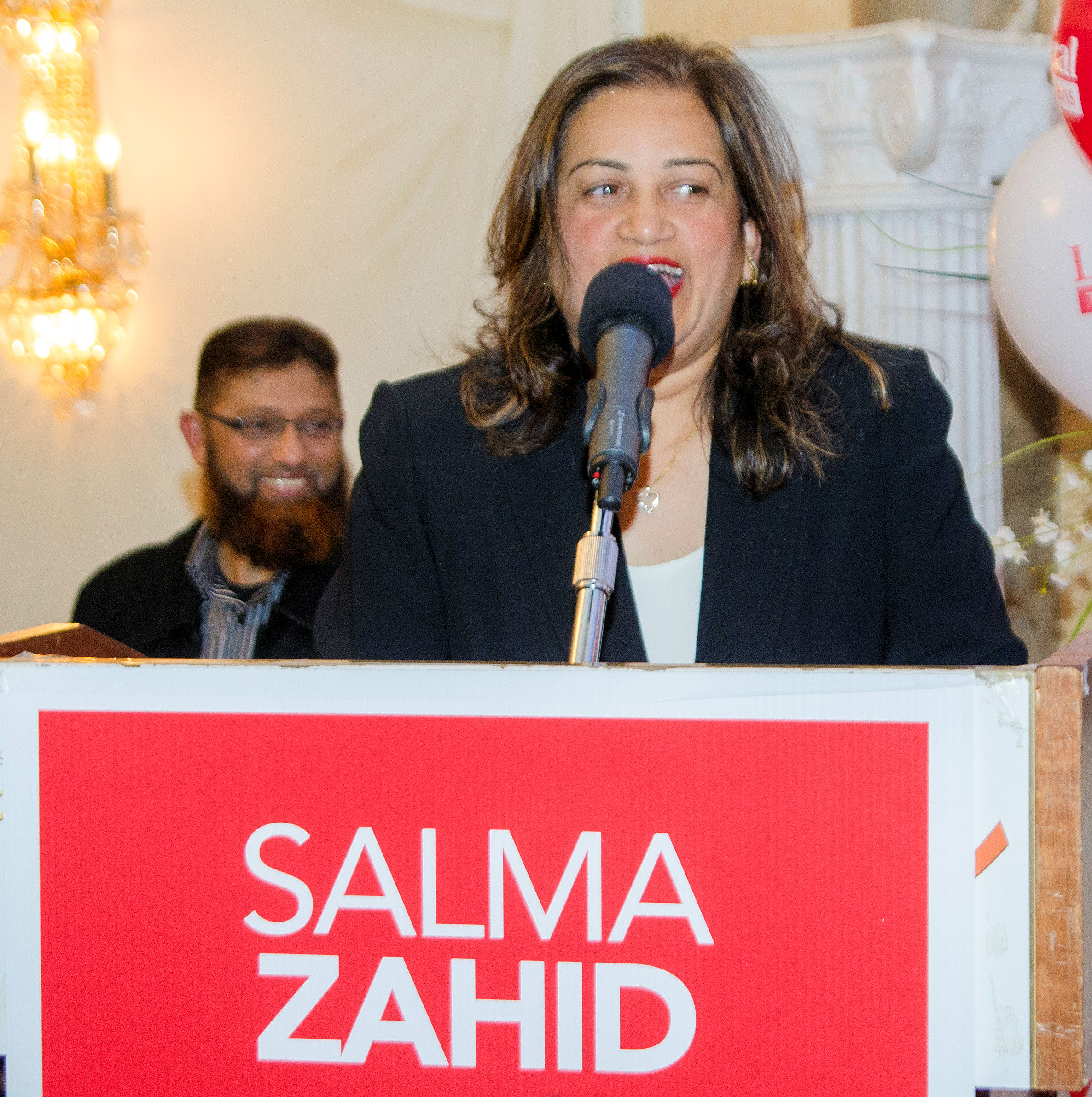
Salma Zahid is a Member of Parliament of Canada.

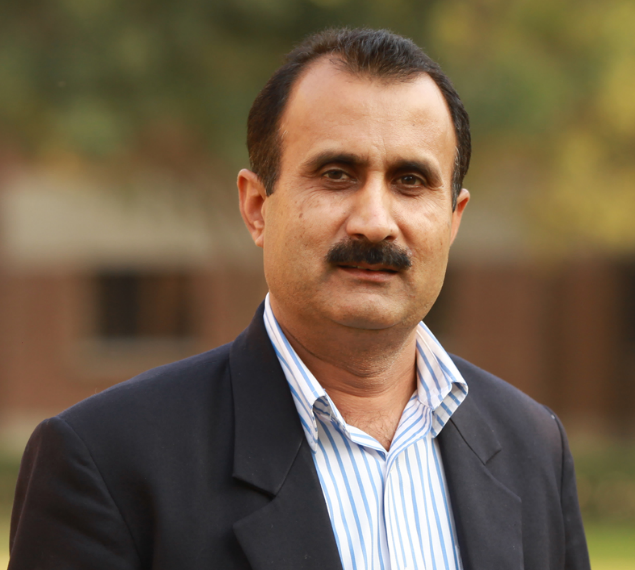
Irshad Hussain is a Pakistani chemist and Nanomaterials scientist.

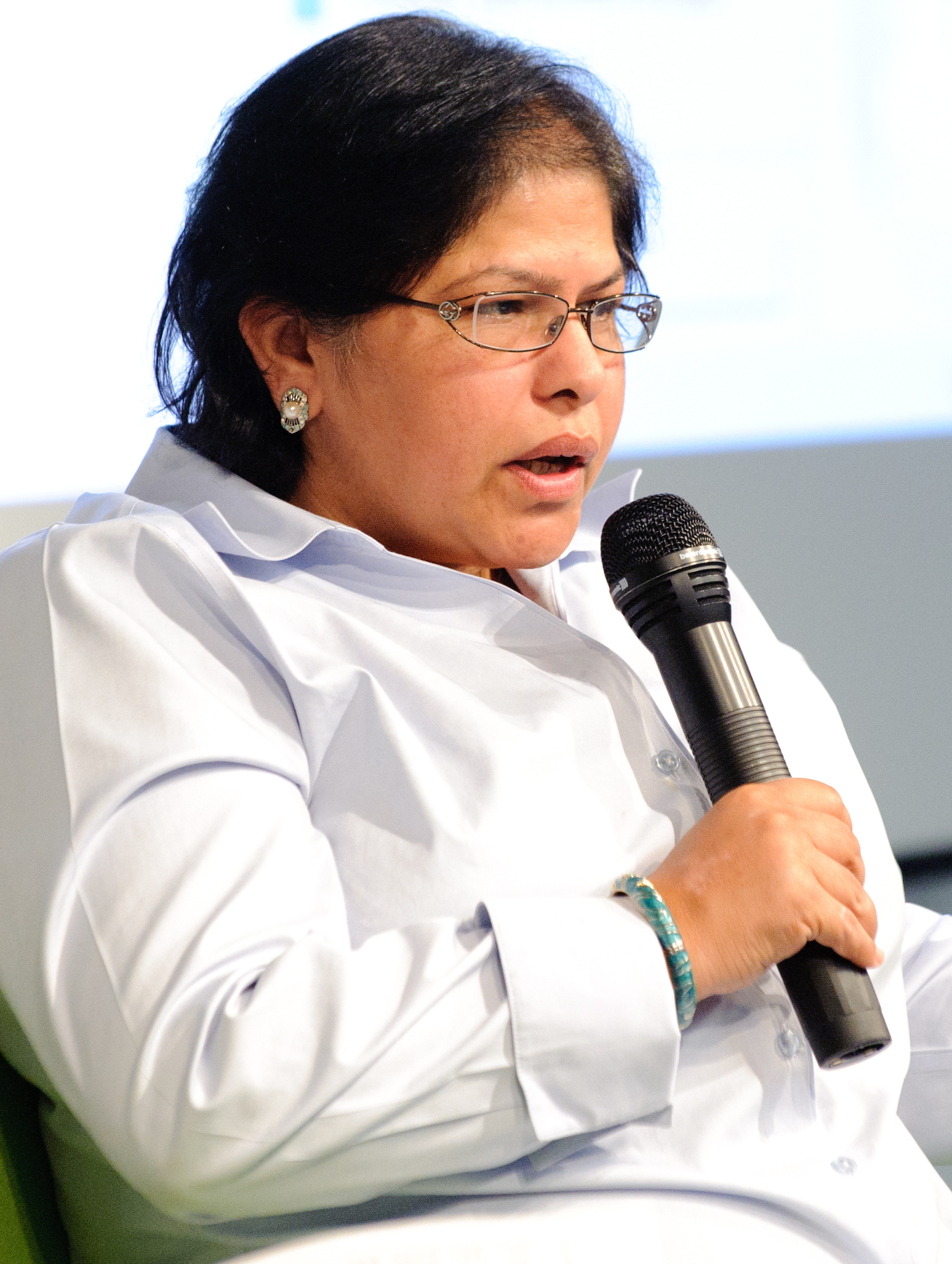
Ayesha Siddiqa is a Pakistani military scientist.

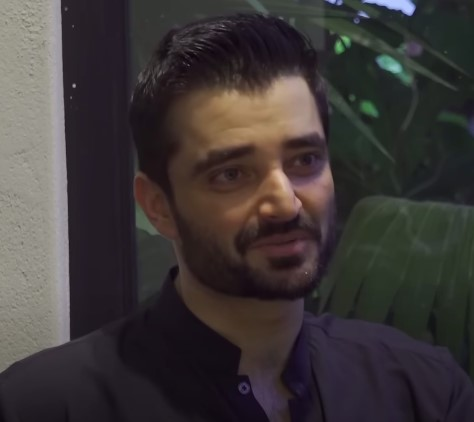
Hamza Ali Abbasi is a Pakistani actor and director.

== See also ==
- List of Islamic educational institutions
