= Tahir Amin =

Pakistani political scientist

- طاہر امین
- Born: 13 March 1952
- Died: 5 April 2019 (aged 67)
- Title: Vice-Chancellor

Academic background
- Education: Massachusetts Institute of Technology; Carleton University; Quaid-i-Azam University

Academic work
- Discipline: Political scientist
- Sub-discipline: Politics of South Asia
- Institutions: Bahauddin Zakariya University; Women University Multan; University of Cambridge; Quaid-i-Azam University

Tahir Amin (Urdu: طاہر امین, 13 March 1952 – 5 April 2019) was a Pakistani political scientist who served as the vice-chancellor of Bahauddin Zakariya University, in Multan, Pakistan. Amin also held additional charge of the vice-chancellor of Women University Multan.

Previously, he was the Iqbal Chair at the Centre for International Studies, University of Cambridge, UK (c.1997–2001, succeeding Akbar S. Ahmed, followed by Tahir Kamran). He had a PhD in political science from the Massachusetts Institute of Technology (1988), a master's degree in international relations from Carleton University, Canada (1978), and a B.A. in international relations from Quaid-i-Azam University (1976). He received a King Faisal Scholarship to study at MIT, and a Fulbright Award at Harvard University (1992), where he worked on a research project on "Reactions of the Non-Western World to the Thesis of the Clash of Civilizations by Samuel Huntington." He was a visiting Fellow at the Watson Institute for International and Public Affairs, Brown University, Providence, USA (1996), and at the Center for International Affairs (CFIA) at Harvard University.

Amin has also served as a member of the board of governors at the National Institute of Pakistan Studies, at the National Institute of History Commission, and at the Area Study Center for North America and Africa, all at Quaid-i-Azam University.

His research focuses on questions of world order, Pakistan's foreign relations, domestic politics of Pakistan, Kashmir, terrorism, and the politics of South and Central Asia.

== Research and publications ==
=== Books and monographs ===
Published monographs include:

- Amin, Tahir (1995). Mass Resistance in Kashmir: Origins, Evolution, Options. Islamabad: Institute of Policy Studies.
- Amin, Tahir (1991). Nationalism and Internationalism in Liberalism, Marxism and Islam. Islamabad: International Institute of Islamic Thought. ISBN 969-462-002-3.
- Amin, Tahir (1988). Ethno-national movements of Pakistan: domestic and international factors. Islamabad: Institute of Policy Studies. ISBN 9789694480008.
- Amin, Tahir (1982). Afghanistan crisis: implications and options for Muslim world, Iran, and Pakistan. Islamabad: Institute of Policy Studies. ISBN 9780939830282.
- Amin, Tahir (1980). Tashkent Declaration: Third Party's Role in the Resolution of Conflict. Islamabad: Institute of Strategic Studies.

=== Scholarly articles ===
He has written more than two dozen peer-reviewed articles or chapters, including:

- "Kashmir Question" in The Different Aspects of Islamic Culture Vol. VI: Islam in World Today (Paris: UNESCO, 2012);
- "1977 Coup D’etat in Pakistan" in Pakistan Journal of History and Culture Vol.XXV111 No 2 (July–Dec.2007);
- "Developments of Pakistan’s Foreign Policy: A Case Study on Recognition of Taliban" (Lahore: Pildat, 2004);
- "The Plebiscite Option in Kashmir: A Reappraisal" in The Kashmir Imbroglio: Looking Towards the Future Islamabad (Islamabad Policy Research Institute, 2005);
- "Pakistan and the Islamic World Order" in Pakistan After 9/11: The Turn Around (Institute of Strategic Studies and Wolfson College Cambridge, 2005);
- "Pakistan’s Foreign Policy: An Evaluation", National Development and Security (Autumn 2003);
- "Changing Global and Regional Scenario and Pakistan", National Development and Security (Spring 2003);
- "Indian Approach towards the Kashmir Dispute", in K.F. Yousaf (ed). Perspectives on Kashmir (Islamabad: 1994); ‘Kargil Crisis in Kashmir’, Cambridge Review of International Affairs (Spring/Summer 2000);
- "Pakistan and the Central Asian States," in Myron Weiner, et al. The New Geopolitics of Central Asia and its Border Lands (Bloomington: Indiana University Press 1994);
- "Kashmir," in the Oxford Encyclopedia of Islam (London: Oxford University Press 1996); "Accommodation Across Cultures: Towards a Peaceful World Order," Strategic Studies (Winter 1996);
- "Pakistan in 1994: Politics of Confrontation," Asian Survey (February 1995); "Pakistan in 1993: Some Dramatic Changes," Asian Survey (February 1994);
- "Changing World Order and Pakistan," Strategic Perspectives, Vol. 1, No. 1 (Summer 1991); "Moscow’s Kabul Connection: Lesson for Asian Countries," Strategic Studies (Fall 1982); "Two Years of Afghan Resistance" Pakistan Journal of Social Sciences, Vol. VII, no 1 & 2;
- "Pakistan-United States Aid Deal: A Pakistan Perspective," Pakistan Journal of American Studies, Vol. 2, No. 1 (March 1984);
- "Iran: Political Economy of an Islamic State," American Journal of Islamic Social Sciences (Washington, DC July 1985); and "Afghan Resistance: Past, Present and Future," Asian Survey (April 1984).

=== Reception ===
Scholar Reeta Tremblay from Concordia University notes in a scholarly review of Mass Resistance in Kashmir, that despite a claim to following a "social-scientific method", the book suffers from nationalist bias with arguments and counterarguments supported by "conjectural and emotional analysis" and in this sense is no exception to most works by Indian and Pakistani scholars which Tremblay observes also suffer from nationalist bias. She also finds it most worrisome that Amin paints the Kashmir resistance movement as fundamentally Islamic, seeking Kashmir's integration with Pakistan. According to Tremblant waving Pakistani flags and shouting pro-Pakistan slogans do not mean that the Valley's Muslim population want to join Pakistan. She also finds Amin arguing that Pakistan must actively support the resistance by offering military assistance, orchestrate economic sanctions against India and shape the resistance into a modern guerrilla warfare "capable of inflicting lethal blows to the Indian army". The history of Kashmir is presented as a Muslim history without any attention to the alternative versions of history by the Kashmiri Pandits. In examining the causes of the movement, she notes that Amin takes no account of the military training of the militants by the Jamaat-e-Islami Pakistan and other groups in Pakistan-administered Kashmir. She finds Amin's claim that the mobilisation of Kashmiris was achieved "in the name of Islam" rather than that of nationalism, as being flawed and unsubstantiated. She also finds as unsubstantiated Amin's claim that the JKLF's popularity is confined to urban areas and Hizbul Mujahideen is more popular in rural areas. Tremblay ends her review by arguing that Kashmir's Azadi movement is genuine and such a hawkish analysis does not do justice to the Kashmiri cause.

Scholar Lawrence Ziring in a scholarly review of Amin's work Ethno-National Movements in Pakistan: Domestic and International Factors calls the book timely and useful and observes that Amin's work is thoughtful, well-researched, full of information and insight and is written in a readable style. Although Ziring considers it a useful study he says the book is not without its problems. Ziring believes the East Pakistan factor should have been part of the analysis and also doubts Amin's claim that the Pashtunistan issue is no longer significant. According to Ziring, Amin's problem is his desire to suggest that movements can change their character without changing their direction. Ziring ends the review by saying that there is no reason to quarrel with Amin's complaint that ethnic elite be included in political power but says it is also important to accept that issues of national integration can never fully be resolved. Ziring considers the book essential reading for students of Pakistan, ethnicity and those looking for a parallel between East Bengal and Sindh.
