= Nuclear power in Pakistan =

Nuclear power plants in Pakistan
Commercial active plants
Research active plants
Military research active plants

In Pakistan, nuclear power is provided by six nuclear reactors in two commercial nuclear power plants with a net capacity of 3,545 MW from pressurized water reactors. In FY2023, Pakistan's nuclear power plants (NPPs) produced a total of 24.054 terawatt-hours of electricity, which accounted for roughly 18.65% of the nation's total electric energy generation. Pakistan is the first country in the Muslim world to construct and operate commercial nuclear plants, with first being commissioned in 1972. As of 2025, there is one NPP (Chashma-V) that is under construction and expected to produce 1,200 MW of electricity. Only one NPP, KANUPP-1 has been decommissioned, after a 50-year run in 2021. Under its current policy to address its energy security, the country plans on constructing 32 commercial NPPs by 2050, with a combined generation capacity of 40,000 MW to meet 25% of the nation's electricity demands.

The nuclear power in Pakistan is regulated through the Pakistan Nuclear Regulatory Authority (PNRA), which grants licenses and their renewals, while the Pakistan Atomic Energy Commission (PAEC) manages the operations of the NPPs. Due to the country's refusal to join the Nuclear Non-Proliferation Treaty (NPT) and accept full-scope IAEA safeguards, the imports and access to the reactor technology has been restricted by the Nuclear Suppliers Group (NSG). In the past, Canada partnered with Pakistan in providing the nation's first nuclear power plant in 1965 and later, China and the IAEA has provided support in providing the nuclear power plants since 1993 at address its challenges relating to energy security.

== History ==
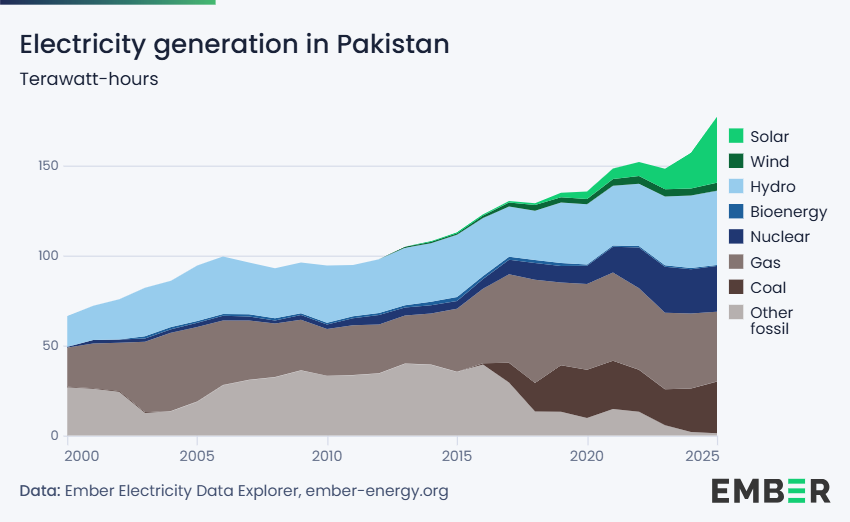
Electricity generation in Pakistan in terawatt-hours

In 1960, the plans on the construction for nation's first nuclear power plant were submitted to the Ayub administration by the Pakistan Atomic Energy Commission, with support from the Abdus Salam who was serving in capacity as Science Advisor to the Government of Pakistan at that time. In fact, it was Abdus Salam's efforts that led to the approval of the country's first commercial nuclear power plant at the Paradise Point in Karachi, Sindh. During this time, the Ayub administration successfully negotiated the Canadian government that allowed the GE Canada to work with the Pakistan Atomic Energy Commission in designing and constructing the country's first commercial nuclear power in 1965.

In 1965, the Pakistan Atomic Energy Commission's Centre for Nuclear Studies (CNS) was able to design and construct its own small reactor, known as the Pakistan Atomic Research Reactor (PARR-I) in Nilore. The fuel bundles were for this reactor were, however, provided by the United States Atomic Energy Commission (USAEC) through the International Atomic Energy Agency (IAEA) for research and training purposes only. The first commercial nuclear power plant was design on the basis of CANDU-type which was earlier offered to India (in 1955) but Canada had its priced at US$ 10 million ($102 million in 2025) which was too expensive for the country's taxpayers to afford.

The Pakistan Atomic Energy Commission eventually negotiated with the GE Canada to redesign the reactor for Pakistan-specific needs, which resulted in a 137 MW (0.137 GW) CANDU-type pressurised heavy water reactor and it featured stark differences in the reactor designs supplied to India by Canada.

=== Start of commercial nuclear power ===
On 28 November 1972, the country's first nuclear power plant, the Karachi Nuclear Power Plant (KANUPP), was commissioned and went online with nation's electric grid system. Reportedly constructed at the taxpayer's cost of US$23 million ($177 million in 2025), the commissioning of KANUPP reactor provided a distinction to Pakistan as a "first in the Muslim world to have an operating nuclear power station."

In 1973, the Zulfikar Ali Bhutto's administration entered in several nuclear power agreements with France, Germany, Belgium, and the United Kingdom but Zulfikar Ali Bhutto administration's refusal to be a party of the Nuclear Non-Proliferation Treaty (NPT) restricted any meaningful agreements with any of the European nuclear fuel suppliers.

After the India's first nuclear test in 1974, Canada and France became party of the Nuclear Suppliers Group (NSG) that restricted any cooperation on nuclear power with the country unless the country becomes the party of the NPT. In the absence of the foreign cooperation, the Pakistan Atomic Energy Commission worked on feasibility studies for its own power reactor and had secured funding for the nuclear power plant at the Chashma Nuclear Power Plant from the Zia administration in 1980. In 1985, the project was delegated to the former Soviet Union who later decided against participating in the project. Benazir Bhutto's administration again held unsuccessful negotiations with France on participating in the Chashma Nuclear Power Plant in 1990. Eventually, the Sharif administration entered in successful negotiation with China for the construction of the Chashma Nuclear Power Plant in 1993. On 14 September 2000, the Chashma Nuclear Power Plant was commissioned and went online with the country's grid electric grid system.

Since 2000, Pakistan has signed multiple bilateral agreements with China in expanding its energy needs through nuclear power at the Karachi Nuclear Power Complex and the Chashma Nuclear Power Complex that has alleviated its economy and provided energy security to the country. The agreement with China on acquiring the nuclear power reactor technology was entrusted and transferred through the International Atomic Energy Agency's remedial and its safeguards.

== International cooperation ==
=== China ===
Since 2000, Pakistan and China have signed multiple bilateral agreements on the issues of nuclear power under the IAEA's permission and safeguards. Outside China, Pakistan is the only country that has commissioned and successfully operates the Chinese pressurized water reactors. In 1993, China agreed on supplying the 324 MW (0.324 GW) CNP-300 reactor, which Pakistan Atomic Energy Commission had to conducted several lengthy safety and quality assurances tests.

Cooperation of China and International Atomic Energy Agency (IAEA) with Pakistan's nuclear power expansion has been critical for Pakistan's energy security matters since the hydroelectricity has been a subject of political controversies between the four provinces of Pakistan. In 2005, the Ministry of Finance had approved Rs. 51.461 billion (US$184 million) for the construction of the second nuclear power plant in Chashma Nuclear Power Plant, alongside a separate safeguard agreement between Pakistan and IAEA allowed the country to operate the nuclear power plants under the safe manner and only be used only for power generation. Under the 2005 Energy Security Agreement signed between Pakistan, China, and the IAEA, it is expected to increase power generation through nuclear power by 2030.

Since 2000, Pakistan has commissioned Chinese-exported 1,000 MW (1.0 GW) pressurized water reactors at its sites in Karachi and Chashma. The cooperation between China and Pakistan on commercial nuclear power plants has attracted controversies due to Pakistan being nonsignatory to the NPT treaty. The Pakistan and China have refuted and rebuffed the controversy with China informing the IAEA that the nuclear power reactors' exports are under the IAEA terms as all the nuclear power plant sites are placed under the IAEA inspections and international safeguards.

India, which is also not a member of the Nuclear Suppliers Group, has been critical of Pakistan's nuclear power expansion and has criticized the safety design features incorporated into the nuclear power reactors exported to Pakistan from China.

=== France ===
In 2009, the Gillani administration held talks with French government on cooperation relating to reactor technologies, which was said to be a "significant development" between two nations by the Gillani administration's Foreign ministry. Contrary to the Gillani administration expectations, the Sarkozy presidency was careful in its response, which was only interested in nonproliferation issues with Gillani administration."

In 2013, the French Ambassador to Pakistan, Philippe Thiebaud, opened the option of "civil nuclear cooperation at request" between two nation in line of international obligations. In spite of engagement between two nations in 2009 and 2013, no agreements have been reached between two nations owing to the France's strategic ties with India.

=== United States ===
In a U.S.–Pakistan strategic dialogue on 24 March 2010, Pakistan pressed for a civil nuclear cooperation deal similar to that with India, though the request was denied by the United States but the talks were held on nonproliferation matters.

=== Japan ===
In 2011, President Asif Ali Zardari unsuccessfully persuaded Japanese government on signing a civil nuclear agreement that reflected the similar contract between India and Japan on nuclear cooperation; this was denied by the Japanese government.

Before the state visit of President Zardari, Japan held talks with Pakistan which was focused only on nonproliferation issues and stability in South Asia.

== Nuclear power plants ==
Nuclear Power Plants in Pakistan
| Commercial Nuclear Power Plants | Acronym | Reactor Unit | Type | Commission | Status | Decommission | Lifetime | Net Capacity |
|---|---|---|---|---|---|---|---|---|
| Karachi Nuclear Power Complex | KANUPP | K1 | PHWR | 1971 | Suspended | 2021 | 50-years | 137 MW |
| Karachi Nuclear Power Complex | KANUPP | K2 | PWR | 2021 | Active | | | 1100 MW |
| Karachi Nuclear Power Complex | KANUPP | K3 | PWR | 2022 | Active | | | 1110 MW |
| Karachi Nuclear Power Complex | KANUPP | K4 | PWR | | Planned | | | 1400 MW (rated) |
| Karachi Nuclear Power Complex | KANUPP | K5 | PWR | | Planned | | | 1400 MW (rated) |
| Chashma Nuclear Power Complex | CHASNUPP | C1 | PWR | 2000 | Active | | | 325 MW |
| Chashma Nuclear Power Complex | CHASNUPP | C2 | PWR | 2011 | Active | | | 325 MW |
| Chashma Nuclear Power Complex | CHASNUPP | C3 | PWR | 2016 | Active | | | 340 MW |
| Chashma Nuclear Power Complex | CHASNUPP | C4 | PWR | 2017 | Active | | | 340 MW |
| Chashma Nuclear Power Complex | CHASNUPP | C5 | PWR | | Under construction | | | 1200 MW (rated) |
| Total NPPs active: | | | | 6 | Total gross capacity of active reactors: | | | 3,540 MW (3.54 GW) |

== Research reactors ==
Research reactors in Pakistan
| Facility | Acronym | Purpose | Reactor Unit | Type | Commission | Status | Power Output |
|---|---|---|---|---|---|---|---|
| Pakistan Institute of Nuclear Science & Technology | PINSTECH | Nuclear Research and Development / Under IAEA safeguards | PARR-l | MTR/Pool | 1965 | Active | 5 MW |
| Pakistan Institute of Nuclear Science & Technology | PINSTECH | Nuclear Research and Development / Under IAEA safeguards | PARR-ll | MNSR/Pool | 1989 | Active | 30 KW |
| Pakistan Institute of Nuclear Science & Technology | PINSTECH | Nuclear Research and Development / Under IAEA safeguards | PARR-lll | Pool | | Under construction | 10 MW (rated) |
| Khushab Nuclear Complex | KNC | Military / Not Under IAEA safeguards | Khushab-I | HWR | 1998 | Active | 50 MW (rated) |
| Khushab Nuclear Complex | KNC | Military / Not Under IAEA safeguards | Khushab-Il | HWR | 2010 | Active | 50 MW (rated) |
| Khushab Nuclear Complex | KNC | Military / Not Under IAEA safeguards | Khushab-Ill | HWR | 2013 | Active | 50 MW (rated) |
| Khushab Nuclear Complex | KNC | Military / Not Under IAEA safeguards | Khushab-IV | HWR | 2015 (speculated) | Active | 50 MW (rated) |
| Khushab Nuclear Complex | KNC | Military / Not Under IAEA safeguards | Khushab-V | | | Under construction (speculated) | |
| Total research reactors active: | | | | | 6 | | |

== Nuclear Fuel cycle ==
After 1974, Pakistan has worked independently in its ability and capability to developed indigenous nuclear fuel cycle. The front-end and the back-end of the nuclear fuel cycle technology was developed at its Pakistan Institute of Nuclear Science & Technology laboratory while the atomic energy commission conducted several studies with the Geological Survey of Pakistan for the prospect of uranium exploration.

There are several uranium mining sites throughout Pakistan where the mineral excavation and refinement of ores took place, most of the which the reservations are owned by the Ministry of Energy (MoE) for nuclear fuel cycle. Built in 1980, the Kundian Nuclear Fuel Complex is a premier facility where nuclear fuel bundles for the Karachi Nuclear Power Plant are manufactured. The uranium conversion facility in Islamabad converts the yellowcake (uranium oxide or urania) into the uranium hexflouride (UF_{6}) gas before commencing the industrial enrichment at Gadwal Enrichment Plant for nuclear power production for the nuclear power sites in Karachi and Chashma.

In 2006, the Pakistan Atomic Energy Commission was approved for funding by the federal government to construct the Pakistan Nuclear Power Fuel Complex to locally manufacture fuel bundles for the Chasma Nuclear Power Plant. Unlike the Kundian, Gadwal, and Islamabad, this facility is under IAEA safeguards with regular inspections and monitoring of its operations.

In 2015, the Ministry of Energy sat a target of producing 350 tonnes (350,000 kg) of triuranium octoxide (U_{3}O_{8}) per year from 2015 to meet one third of anticipated requirements then.

=== Nuclear reprocessing ===
There are many nuclear processing sites in Pakistan that can produce the by-products of plutonium in varying qualities and grades of plutonium. The reactor-grade plutonium is produced at the Karachi Nuclear Power Plant and the Chashma Nuclear Power Plant, both of which, have separate plutonium separation facility and under the IAEA safeguard programs. Production of weapon-grade plutonium takes place in Nilore and Khushab, both of which, are separated from the nuclear power generation– therefore unsafeguarded from the IAEA inspections.

At the back-end of the nuclear fuel cycle, the spent fuel undergoes of chemical process, reprocessing, to collect the reactor-grade plutonium and decaying uranium at the separate sites in Karachi and Chashma. At Karachi and Chashma, the plutonium extracted from the spent nuclear fuel which is monitored and requires the atomic energy commission to report the plutonium activities to IAEA. At Karachi and Chashma, the dismantling, storages, and separation of uranium and plutonium fuel rods from other impurities from tributyl phosphate solvent are all reported in its solid form to as a nuclear fuel to run the nuclear power plants. The heavy water to be used as a coolant in Karachi and Chashma nuclear power plants is produced at the heavy water facility in Multan, Punjab in Pakistan.

Without the international cooperation, the atomic energy commission spent decades on learning the nuclear reprocessing as most studies were conducted at the second Pakistan Atomic Research Reactor located in Pinstech laboratory. Under the IAEA guidelines and monitoring, the plutonium separation sites at the Karachi Nuclear Power Plant and the Chasma Nuclear Power Plant have expanded to increase the nuclear power generation and to address Pakistan's energy security issues. The back-end nuclear fuel cycle is managed by the IAEA-authorized contractor, the China-Pakistan Power Plant Corporation.

== Waste disposal ==
The nuclear and hazardous waste is managed by the Pakistan's nuclear regulartory authority and has taken steps to ensure the safe disposal of the hazardous waste since 1972. Monitoring of the waste management and federal regulatory oversights are provided by the Pakistan's nuclear regulatory authority in a series of guidelines at their Radioactive Waste Management Facility.

The nuclear waste is stored at the Baghalchur-1 facility, which became a subject of political controversy when the residents filed a lawsuit against the atomic energy commission at the Supreme Court of Pakistan. The case was eventually settled between the Pakistan's atomic energy commission and the legal firms representing the residents amid the intervention from the nuclear regulatory authority.

In light of the lawsuit, the nuclear regulatory authority's guidelines were eventually signed into the law enacted by the Parliament of Pakistan in 2010.

There are four deep nuclear waste repositories in Southern Pakistan. The extremely high hazardous nuclear waste is being managed in the most-northern side of southern region while the low nuclear waste is being managed in the southern region of the country.

== Organizations ==
=== Industry and academic ===
The Pakistan Nuclear Society (PNS) is a scientific and educational society that has both industry and academic members. The nuclear society lobbies for the cause of the nuclear power generation by holding conferences and publishing papers on civilian nuclear technology at its journal.

On the topic of nuclear engineering and reactor physics, the Pakistan's atomic energy commission has sponsors large publication in its quarterly magazine— The Nucleus. The PAEC's academic scientists and engineers also publishes the newsletter— The PakAtom— concerning on nuclear technology and lobbying for the commercial nuclear power plants. Education on nuclear engineering is provided at the Pakistan Institute of Engineering and Applied Sciences in Nilore, NED University, Institute of Power Engineering in Karachi, and professional training and certifications at the Centre of Nuclear Training in Chashma, and the Center of Nuclear Power Training in Karachi.

The other organizations that also the country's industry and the academics are part of included the CANDU Owners Group and the World Association of Nuclear Operators.

== Employment ==
In 2021, the assessment compiled by the China's National Nuclear Corporation, the Karachi Nuclear Power Plant's construction works has promoted the development of related industries in Pakistan, providing more than 10,000 jobs for the local area.

== Nuclear Power Programme 2050 ==
The Nuclear Power Program 2050 is an official policy measure program of the federal Government of Pakistan to utilize the nuclear power to meet to increase its energy capacity to support the national economy of Pakistan.

The policy addresses the nation's energy security matters by aiming to expand the self-sustaining nuclear power infrastructure all over the country by year 2050 with cooperation from China. This program is seen as a direct response to the India–United States nuclear deal, as well as to counter the existing energy shortfalls and future requirements of a growing population and national economy. The primary focus of this program is to promote scientific and socio-economic development of the people as a "foremost priority."

This policy measure program was first announced on 14 July 2011 and enacted by the Gilani administration at the National Command Authority by Prime minister Yousaf Raza Gillani. The policy measures to regulate the nuclear power facilities, safe management of waste storage, along with an increase in power plant building to meet the target of producing 8,800 MW (8.8 GW) electricity in the country. PAEC said an initial 1100 MWe plant would be built at Muzaffargarh, on the Taunsa-Panjnad canal near Multan in southwest Punjab. It was also reported that discussions with China were under way to supply three nuclear power units for about $13 billion.

== Economics ==
In Pakistan, the Ministry of Energy (MoE) has prioritized the hydropower over the nuclear power, mainly influenced from the budgetary point of view. Furthermore, the facilities and infrastructure, which operates outside the IAEA safeguards, to support the nuclear power plants have been subjected to criticism at the international venue.

However, the issue of building the larger earth-filled dams has always been subject of political controversy between the four provinces of Pakistan where water is scarce and usually are installed in upcountry. On both energy sources, Pakistan has spent billions of dollars from its taxpayers funds, and initiated in capital loans from the international monetary banks to build the hydropower and nuclear power infrastructure to address its energy security.

The Asian Development Bank, World Bank, International Monetary Fund, United Nations Development Program, and the loans (also engineering assistance) from the United States subsequently helped Pakistan building its hydroelectric power stations and dams whereas the nuclear power plants were financed from the loans given to Pakistan by Canada (in past) and currently from China.

In an absence of the international interaction and cooperation, federal Government of Pakistan has spent large financial capital from its federal budgets and taxpayer's funds in investing on education and building the training resources locally on reactor and nuclear engineering to its general nuclear workforce.

== See also ==
- Nuclear power
- Nuclear power by country
