= Karachi Nuclear Power Complex =

Nuclear power plant in Karachi, Pakistan

Karachi Nuclear Power Plant (KANUPP)
- Official name: Karachi Nuclear Power Complex
- Country: Pakistan
- Location: Paradise Point, Karachi, Sindh
- Coordinates: 24°50′55″N 66°46′55″E
- Status: Operational
- Construction began: K1: 1 August 1966; K2: 20 August 2015; K3: 31 May 2016
- Commission date: K1: 18 October 1971; K2: 18 March 2021; K3: 4 March 2022
- Decommission date: K1: 1 August 2021
- Construction cost: K1: US$57.3 million (1966); K2 & K3: US$9.6 billion (2013)
- Owner: Government of Pakistan
- Operators: Pakistan Atomic Energy Commission (Reactor management); NESPAK (Site and energy management)

Nuclear power station
- Reactors: 2 Operational (K2 and K3); 1 Decommissioned (K1)
- Reactor type: K1: PHWR; K2-K3: PWR
- Reactor supplier: GE Canada (Until 1976); Kundian Nuclear Fuel Complex; China Nuclear Power Corp.
- Cooling source: Arabian Sea
- Feed-in tariff: K1: 14.2 Bn kWh
- Thermal capacity: K1: 337 MW_{t} (1971–2021); K2: 3,060 MW_{t}; K3: 3,060 MW_{t}

Power generation
- Units operational: 2 x 1,014 MW_{e}
- Make and model: K1: CANDU; K2-K3: Hualong One
- Units planned: K4: 1400 MW; K5: 1400 MW
- Units decommissioned: 1 x 90 MW_{e} (K1)
- Nameplate capacity: 2,028 MW_{e}
- Capacity factor: K1: 29.5% (Lifetime); K2: 98.8% (Lifetime, as of 2021)
- Annual net output: K2: 6,208.89 GWh (22,352.0 TJ) (2021)

External links
- Website: Karachi Nuclear Power Plant; KANUPP-1 (K-1)

The Karachi Nuclear Power Plant (or KANUPP) is a large commercial nuclear power plant located at the Paradise Point in Karachi, Sindh, Pakistan.

Officially known as Karachi Nuclear Power Complex, the power generation site is composed of three commercial nuclear power plants. The K-1 commenced its criticality operations in 1971 whereas K-2 commenced operations in 2021 with a gross power capacity of 1100 MWt. The K-3, with a design similar to K-2, is due for official commissioning and commenced its criticality operations on 21 February 2022.

The first nuclear power plant, which was later known as K-1, was commissioned with support from Canada whereas K-2 and K-3 have been supported by loans, financing, and investment provided by China and the International Atomic Energy Agency (IAEA). After a lengthy and complicated negotiations with Canada, the Karachi Nuclear Power Plant was constructed by Canadian firms in 1965 and it went critical in August 1971 with a smaller CANDU-type reactor– it provided energy and generated electricity to whole city of Karachi. The site is protected and covered under the IAEA monitoring, which also provided funding for the site's expansion.

The nuclear power plant is the first commercial nuclear plant in the Muslim world.

== History ==
In 1960, Abdus Salam, then-science adviser to Ayub administration, provided a strong advocacy for the industrial usage of the nuclear power in his country at the UN General Assembly, paving away a path for the establishment of the nuclear power plant. Despite the strong opposition from the officials in the Ayub administration, it was the personal efforts of Abdus Salam who had the funding and financing of the nuclear power plant approved from President Ayub Khan. In 1963, the Government of Pakistan commissioned the Geological Survey of Pakistan (GSP) to conduct the survey for the nuclear power plant which selected the Paradise Point and Hawke's Bay as the ideal locations— the GSP selected Paradise Point for the location. Negotiations and talks took place with Canada over the supply of the nuclear power plant in Karachi and the contract was signed with General Electric Canada as the designer and employed the Montreal Engineering Company as its civil engineering firm in 1965.

The nuclear power plant was jointly designed by engineers from the Pakistan Atomic Energy Commission and Canada's General Electric to differentiate it from India's nuclear research reactors, such as CIRUS and Dhruva, which also use CANDU technology. The decision-making factor that was taken under consideration to sell the CANDU technology to Pakistan by Canada was seen as maintaining a balance of power between India and Pakistan. In 1966, the civil engineering and construction started by the Montreal Engineering Co. which finished its construction in 1971. The nuclear power plant attained criticality on 1 August 1971, and commenced on producing full power generation on 2 October 1972.

On 28 November 1972, President Zulfiqar Ali Bhutto inaugurated the Karachi Nuclear Plant when it was connected with the grid system of K-Electric, an investor-owned energy supply utility based in Karachi.

Initially, Canada, through its contractor GE Canada, supplied the deuterium oxide moderator and the natural uranium but it wanted to eject from supporting the operations of the nuclear power plant after 1974 when India exploded the nuclear bomb whose fissile material was produced in CIRUS reactor initially supplied by Canada. In 1975, the GE Canada begin to charge Pakistan $27/lb for deuterium oxide which was expensive for the country's taxpayers to afford.

With Pakistan's refusal of becoming the party of the Nuclear Proliferation Treaty (NPT), the GE Canada halted to sell of imported spare parts, natural uranium, heavy water, and technical support for the nuclear power plant, raising fears of Karachi going under a blackout phase in 1976. With Canadian technicians departing the country, the city was exposed to open radioactive materials while estimating that the nuclear power plant would shut down in six months. Despite Canadian scepticism, the Pakistan Atomic Energy Commission was able to work on producing deuterium oxide at lesser price, and set up the machine shop to manufacture its machinery and tools near nuclear power plant with the assistance from Karachi University.

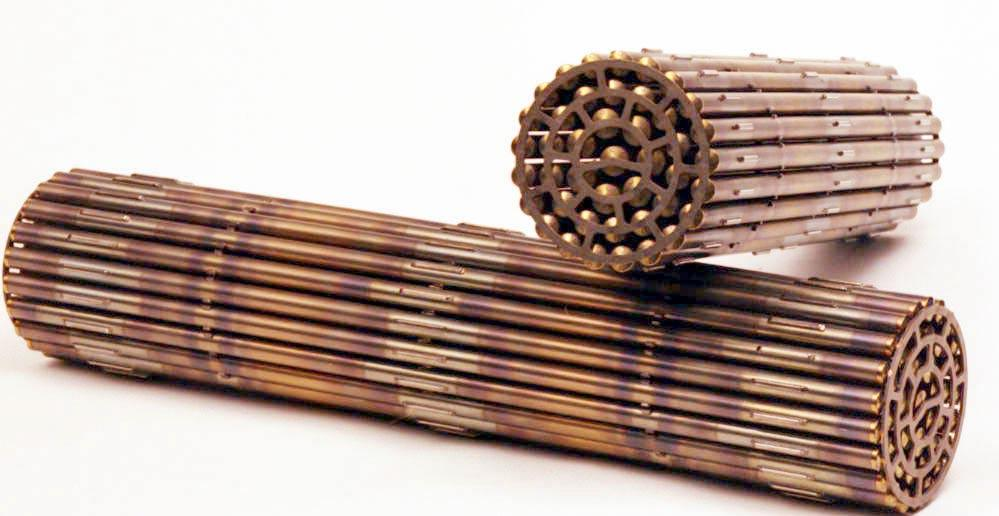
The Beryllium (Be^{4}) fuel bundles manufactured in Pakistan since 1976 after Canada halted the imports.

The Canadian ejection from the project turned out to be a blessing in disguise because it allowed the Pakistan Atomic Energy Commission establish its own machine shops, welding facilities, and training centers with the help from Karachi University that proved to be pivotal on country's production of able machinists and qualified welders as well as nuclear fuel cycle technology. Since 1979, the deuterium oxide and heavy water is locally and indigenously produced by the Pakistan Atomic Energy Commission at the Multan Heavy Water Production Facility that made it possible and kept the plant running its grid operations.

Many of spare parts and machine components were locally designed that kept the nuclear power plant running its grid operation in safe manner– the valuable experience gained was shared to Chinese officials in designing the reactor safety protocols and eventually helped run the Chashma Nuclear Power Plant in 1993.

After intense negotiations and with the IAEA's cooperation in May 1990, Canadian policy towards Karachi Nuclear Power Plant was revised allowing it to provide assistance for Safe Operation of KANUPP (SOK) through the IAEA and only for the IAEA suggested remedial actions.

In 2015 and 2016, China showed great interest in expanding the energy capacity of Karachi Nuclear Power Plant and signed an agreement to supply two Hualong One nuclear power plants with the start of commercial operations scheduled for 2021 and 2022 respectively. Reactor units will have a design life of 60 years and account for approximately 10% of the country's total generation capacity. As of 31 December 2017, the Karachi Nuclear Power Plant has generated 14.2 billion kWhr of electricity and been fueled by thousands of Pakistan-made fuel bundles without any failure.

== Reactor technology ==
=== KANUPP ===
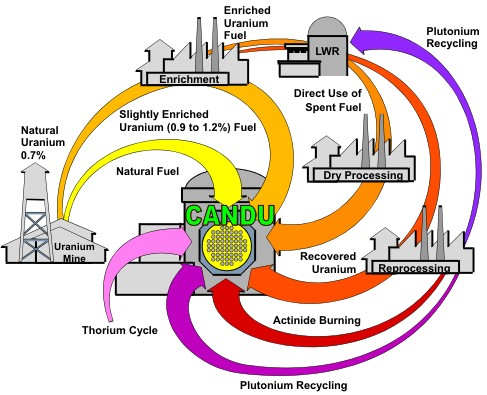
Schema of CANDU-fuel cycle. The fuel cycle of KANUPP was fed by the natural uranium (yellow arrow), though it can accept a variety of fuel type.

The first reactor unit at the Karachi Nuclear Power Plant was a single CANDU-type pressurized heavy-water reactor (PHWR) with a total gross energy generation capacity of 137 Megawatts (MW). It was originally known as "KANUPP"—later classified as K1 in 2010s—that used the water-cooled deuterium oxide (D_{2}O or heavy water) moderator with natural uranium serving it as its fuel. The Multan Heavy Water Production Facility provided the necessary heavy water to Karachi Nuclear Power Plant since 1978

The KANUPP was noted as one of the oldest reactor that used the CANDU-type PHWR system to generate energy from 1971 to 2021. The fuel was natural uranium in the form of sintered uranium dioxide pellets sheathed in thin zirconium alloy tubes to form solid fuel elements about 19.1 inches (48.53 cm) long by 0.6 inches (1.4 cm) diameter.

In 2010, a multi-effect distillation (MED) process source was connected to Karachi Nuclear Power Plant that can produce 1600 m^{3}/d of potable water. In addition, a reverse osmosis plant is also coupled with the nuclear power plant that is producing 454 m^{3}/d of water for reactor usage.

Between 1970 and the 1990s, the KANUPP had generated energy of about ~7.9 billion units of electricity with an average lifetime availability factor of 55.9%. The Canadian technicians designed the life of the plant operations for ~30 years which it did complete its lifetime in 2002. The Nuclear Regulatory Authority (NRA), the regulator of the nuclear power plant, extended its lifetime operation to 2012 (later to 2021), and kept 55.7% capacity factor with total energy generation of 137 MW.

On 1 August 2021, the Canadian unit, K1, was ceased from its criticality operations and was phased out when it was decommissioning from the national grid system, marking the end of its 50-years of long operational services to the nation.

From 1973 to 1979, K1 had an operation factor of 70.1% and between 2006 and 2021, it was at 55.7%.

=== K2 and K3 ===
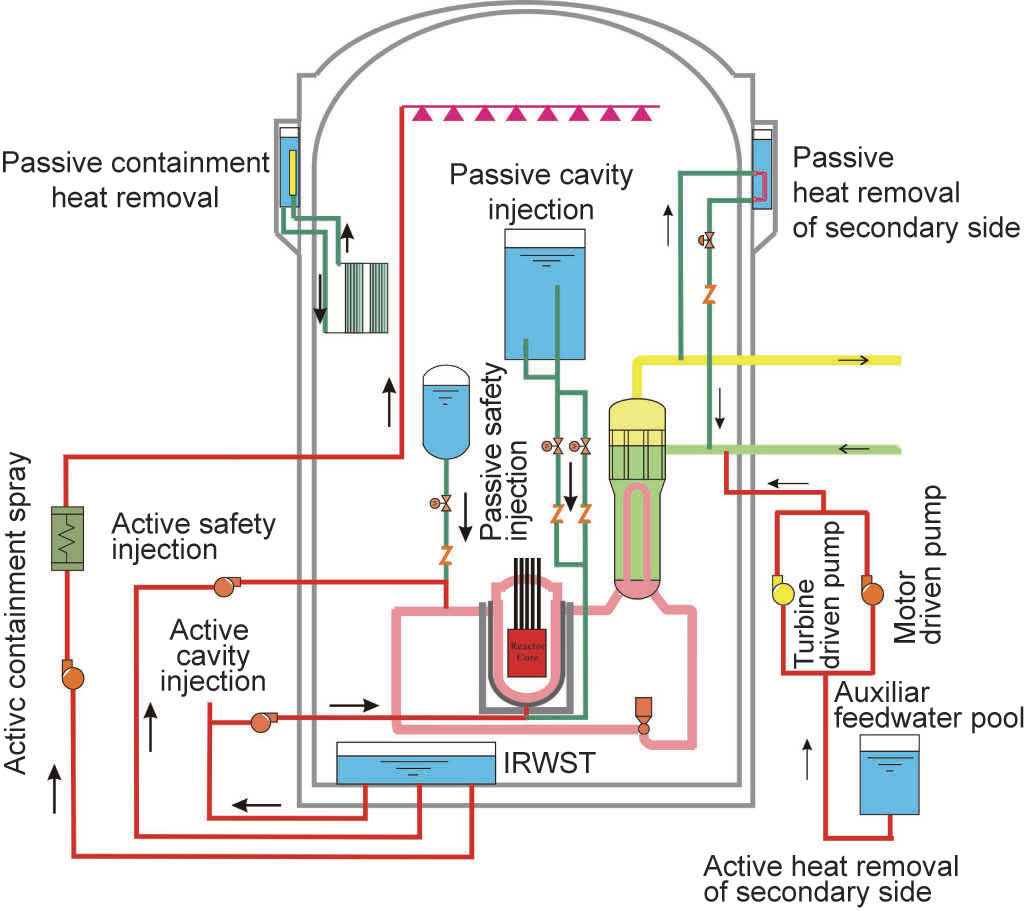
Schema of Hualong On being installed in KANUPP-2.

In 2013, China National Nuclear Corporation secured the turnkey contract to build two ACP1000 reactor units, each producing 1,100 MW. The cost of the project was estimated to be PKR959 billion ($9.6 billion).

The K-2 is a pressurized water reactor (PWR) supplied by the China National Nuclear Corporation, and is jointly designed by the engineers of the Pakistan Atomic Energy Commission. On 26 November 2013, Prime Minister Nawaz Sharif ceremonially broke ground on an energy project at the Karachi Nuclear Power Plant for the construction of two reactor units, one consisting the Hualong One and the other is ACPR-1000— both are pressurized water reactor. Construction of the KANUPP-2 begins on 20 August 2015 and the KANUPP-3's construction commenced on 31 May 2016. Both units are near completion and are expected to attain full energy capacity in 2021 and 2022 respectively.

According to Dr. Ansar Pervaiz, then Chairman of the Pakistan Atomic Energy Commission, said that Chinese banks have provided $6.5 Bn for this project as loans and the cold testing of the reactor system at the KANUPP-2 was commenced on 9 December 2019. KANUPP-2 was synchronised with the electricity grid on 18 March 2021. The China Zhongyuan Engineering Corporation (CZEC) is currently serving its civil engineering consultant for both reactors.

On 2 December 2020, the loading of the nuclear fuel started with the clearance from the Nuclear Regulatory Authority. The criticality operation was successfully commenced on 3 March 2020. On 20 March 2021, the K2 was synchronized with the nation's electricity grid system, with PAEC terming the operation as "Pakistan Day gift" to the nation.

On 28 May 2021, the nuclear power plant was operationalized with nation's energy system and was inaugurated with Prime Minister Imran Khan.

The K3 is also installed with an Hualong One (HPR1000) nuclear reactor supplied by the China National Nuclear Corporation whose construction was commenced on 31 May 2016, being constructed alongside KANUPP-2 and the first steam engine was installed on 28 August 2018.

On 1 January 2022, the fuel loading started, and the nuclear power reactor was connected to the national grid system on 4 March 2022.

=== K4 and K5 ===
Officials with the PAEC have said they want to add another two reactors at Karachi, possibly Hualong One units, each with 1,400 MW of generation capacity. In 2023, the Pakistan Atomic Energy Commission submitted proposed a new design to the Ministry of Energy for establishing the nuclear power plant, K4, with a capacity of 1,400MW in Karachi Nuclear Power Complex.

== Energy management ==
=== Electricity grid connections ===
The National Engineering Services (NES) provides consultancy on energy management of the nuclear power plant and manages the electricity power transmission operations by replacing the aging transformers, three-phase electric powerlines, circuit breakers, and protective relay of the 132 kV double circuit transmission line that links the nuclear power plant to the K-Electric. The NES often works closely with the Institute of Power Engineering of the Karachi University to devise discriminative protection scheme and its integration into the nuclear power plants grid system. In 2010, the NES and Institute of Power Engineering engaged in replacing the electromechanical power relays with the SF_{6} circuit breakers and modern numerical line protection devices.

=== Energy capacity and corporate management ===
The Karachi Nuclear Power Plant was designed to produce gross energy at 137 MWe with the corresponding net output is 125 MWe. From 1972 to 1979, the nuclear power plant operated with relatively high availability capacity factors up to 70% – it provided the electricity and energy to the whole city of Karachi. Between 1972 and 1992, the nuclear power plant generated the energy about 7.9 billion units of electricity with an average lifetime availability capacity factor of 55.9%. In 1994, the nuclear power plant was exceptionally operated at 85.81% of capacity factor– the highest since its establishment. In 2002–04, the nuclear power plant was shut down due to maintenance issues, and is now kept at 55.55% capacity factor, nominally producing 90 MW of electric power.

With the completion of the two more units, the nuclear power plant is expected to produce over 2000 MW of electricity at an 80–90% capacity.

The Karachi Nuclear Power Plant is owned by the Pakistan Atomic Energy Commission which runs the operations through regulations provided by the Nuclear Regulatory Authority (NRA) that is responsible for licensing, inspection and ensuring the safety procedures taking place while running the power plant.

The National Engineering Services (NES) of Pakistan, the contractor, manages nuclear power plant on site on behalf of Nuclear Regulatory Authority and oversees the overall electricity distribution of nuclear power plant including the employment of transformers and grid connections over the city. The K-Electric supports the NES operations to manage the plant and relays on energy provided by the nuclear power plant to feed through its circuits. The Pakistan Atomic Energy Commission, on the other hand, has the responsibility of running the overall operations of the nuclear power plant including computerized machinery, plant stimulators, and manufacturing of fuel bundles, producing fuel cycle, manufacturing tools, and employing of computers.

Energy site contractors

- Montreal Engineering Co. (1965–71)
- GE Canada (1971–76)
- K-Electric
- China NNC
- NES Pakistan

== Reception ==
=== Power outages, leakages, and engineering ===
The Karachi Nuclear Power Plant received wide range of media publicity and fame when it was inaugurated by President Zulfikar Ali Bhutto on 2 November 1972, accompanied by nation's top scientists and high ranking civic officials. Since 2000, the Karachi Nuclear Power Plant has been subjected to a political debate and controversy between nation's anti-nuclear power and pro-nuclear power activists due to its repeated shutdown to generate energy to provide to the city. In 2000, Zia Mian, a physicist at the SDPI based in Islamabad, compared the performance and efficiency of nuclear power plant as "six worst performing reactors in the world."

In the wake of nuclear accident at Fukushima Daiichi Nuclear Power Plant in Japan in 2011, the Nuclear Regulatory Authority (NRA) of Pakistan did a safety inspection of the nuclear power plant. Dr. Pervez Hoodbhoy who visited the nuclear power plant as part of the inspection viewed negatively of the performance of the plant and was very critical of IAEA's monitoring of the plant. Without the Canadian material support, the nuclear power plant has been shut down multiple times in the years of 1979, 1982, 1993, and in 2002. The power outages at the Karachi Nuclear Power Plant has been reported to high as compared to the other Canadian CANDU reactor, mainly attributed to equipment and regulation failure. In 2002, the Nuclear Regulatory Authority was established to set up the regulation codes, safety regulations, and statues based on the experience learned in running the Karachi Nuclear Power Plant.

The uranium hexafluoride (UF6) leakages in nuclear steam cylinder has been commonly reported multiple times but it was addressed when its engineer, S. B. Mahmood, claimed to invent a scientific instrument to prevent further leakages. On 18 October 2011, a seven-hour emergency was imposed by the NES (manager of the plant) after detecting a heavy water leak. The leak was brought under control and the emergency was lifted.

Despite incidents of power outages, the senior physicists and the management of the nuclear power plant has dismissed the criticism of the operations of the nuclear power plant who maintained that the power plant had to be run without Canada's technical and material support, and facilities which were nonexistence in the country to support the operations of the plant. The welding facility, tool manufacturing, and machine shops near the Karachi Nuclear Power Plant were eventually established by Parvez Butt (a mechanical engineer) to support the nuclear power operations of the plant in successive years— Butt was honored with nation's highest honor for this contribution.

According to report submitted to IAEA by S.B. Hussain, a senior physicist who worked at Karachi Nuclear Power Plant, maintained that operating nuclear power plant in the environment of complete Canadian absence was a difficult task, but proved a blessing in disguise, because it provided the Atomic Energy Commission an opportunity to engage in self-reliance in producing nuclear fuel cycle and self-manufacturing programs that was pivotal experience in safely running and managing the much larger Chashma Nuclear Power Plant in Punjab.

According to the assessment compiled by the China's National Nuclear Corporation, the Karachi Nuclear Power Plant's construction works has promoted the development of related industries in Pakistan, providing more than 10,000 jobs for the local area.

Notable staff

  - Parvez Butt– machinist, chief engineer, director of nuclear power, Chair of PAEC (2001–06)
  - Bashiruddin Mahmood– principal engineer
  - Ansar Pervaiz— engineer, general manager of nuclear power plant, Chair of PAEC (2009–13)
  - Wazed Miah, physicist and chief scientist at nuclear power plant (1972–74)
  - Hameed Ahmad Khan, physicist and chief scientist at nuclear power plant
  - Anwar Habib, principal engineer and nuclear safety
  - Zaheer Baig, health physicist and radiation control

== Education facilities ==
=== Training opportunities ===
Since 1973, the Pakistan Atomic Energy Commission engaged in joint educational venture with University of Karachi's physics department to sponsor degree programs in health physics and electronics engineering, and extended partnership with the NED University on electrical engineering, specifically the power engineering.

The Institute of Engineering and Applied Sciences in Islamabad operates and maintains the Institute of Power Engineering in Karachi that offers training programs and courses in nuclear, electrical, and mechanical engineering at the Karachi Nuclear Power Plant.

== See also ==
- Energy in Pakistan
  - Nuclear power in Pakistan
  - Hydroelectric power in Pakistan
  - Electricity in Pakistan
  - Rolling blackout
- Economy of Karachi
  - Industry of Pakistan
  - Industry in Karachi
