= Parvez Butt =

Pakistani physicist (1942–2026)

Pervez Butt
- پرویز بٹ
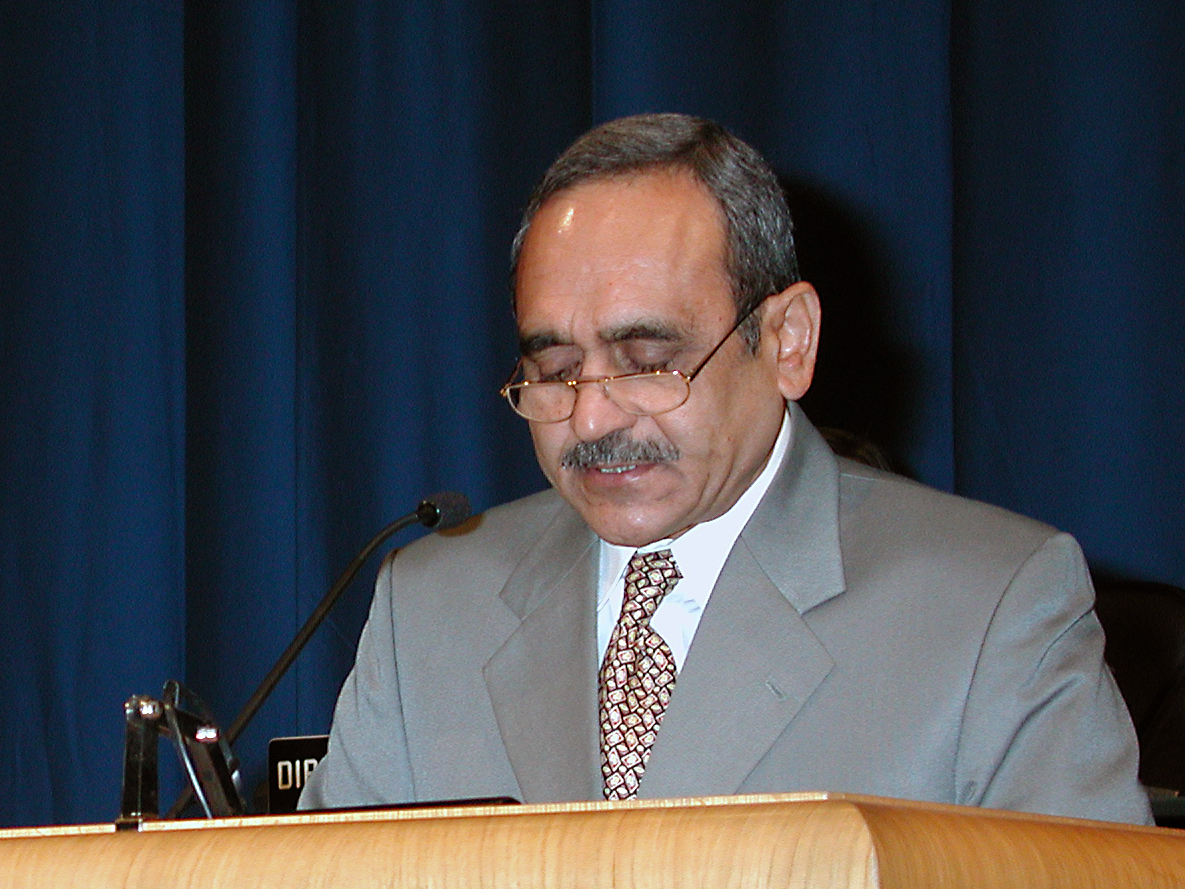
- Born: 4 October 1942; Gujranwala, Punjab Province, British India (now in Punjab, Pakistan)
- Died: 26 July 2026 (aged 83); Islamabad, Pakistan
- Resting place: Islamabad, Pakistan
- Citizenship: Pakistan
- Education: University of Engineering and Technology; University of Toronto
- Known for: Nuclear power in Pakistan
- Awards: Nishan-i-Imtiaz (2015); Hilal-i-Imtiaz (1999); Sitara-i-Imtiaz (1998)
- Scientific career
- Fields: Mechanical Engineering
- Workplaces: Pakistan Atomic Energy Commission; GE Canada; Planning Commission
- Website: Linkedin profile

Parvez Butt NI, HI, SI, PE (Urdu: پرویز بٹ; 4 October 1942 – 26 July 2026) was a Pakistani mechanical engineer and public official who served as the chairman of the Pakistan Atomic Energy Commission from 2001 until 2006.

His career was mostly spent at the Pakistan Atomic Energy Commission's nuclear power division before he chaired the agency, and went to serve in the Musharraf administration as a policy adviser on science as a Federal Secretary, from 2006 until 2008. He continued his public service when he joined the Gilani administration as a policy adviser on nuclear energy at the Planning Commission which he served until 2013.

== Early life and education ==
Butt was born on 4 October 1942 in Gujranwala, Punjab Province of British India, where he did his schooling and matriculation. He attended the University of Engineering and Technology (UET) in Lahore where he graduated as a Bachelor of Science (BS) in mechanical engineering in 1962, and went on to attend the University of Toronto in Canada to pursue higher studies in engineering in 1963.

In 1965, Butt graduated as a Master of Science (MS) in nuclear engineering from the University of Toronto.

== Career at Pakistan Atomic Energy Commission ==
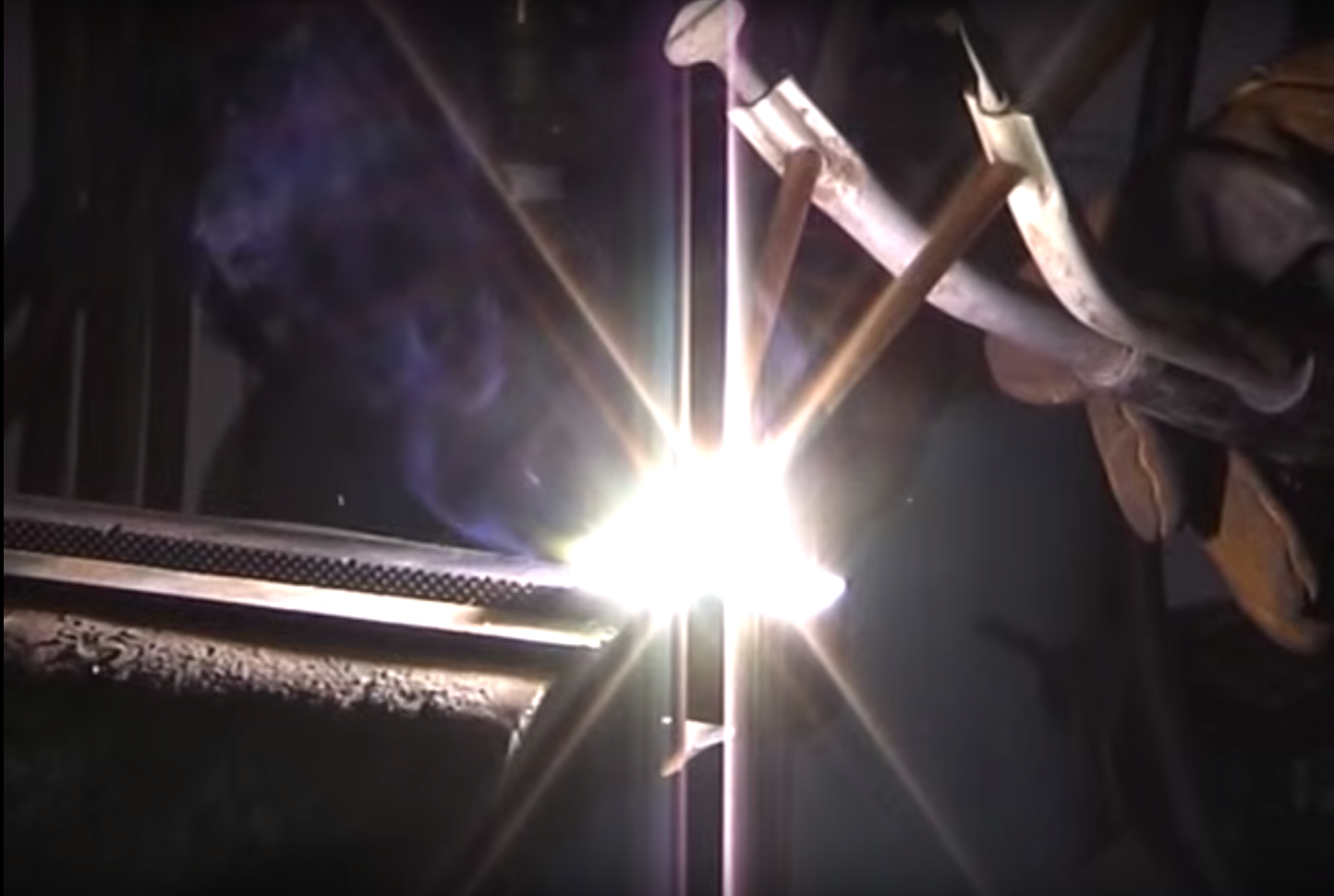
An example of a Carbon Arc torch. Butt co-founded the Pakistan Welding Institute in 1976 to support grid operations at the Karachi Nuclear Power Plant.

In 1963, Butt found employment with the Pakistan Atomic Energy Commission (PAEC) where his career was spent in the nuclear power division rather than weapons production; he was involved in the design phase of his country's first commercial nuclear power in Karachi–the CANDU-type KANUPP-I reactor. From 1965 to 1970, Butt worked in the design engineering at GE Canada at their office in Peterborough, Ontario, where he was involved in overall design of the nuclear power plant.

From 1972 to 1976, Butt worked as principal engineer at the KANUPP-I to ensure the commercial power generation and grid operations of the nuclear power plant to supply energy to Karachi. When the GE Canada decided to eject from supporting the KANUPP program, Butt was instrumental in setting up the machine shop to engage in designing, manufacturing, and production of the mechanical spare parts needed for plant machinery.

Butt built up his reputation among his peers as a reputable machinist and design component engineer whose role was instrumental in setting up the mechanical workshop, machine tools manufacturing shop, and a welding facility that supported the plant operations as part of his responsibility to develop indigenous capability to ensure the grid operations of the nuclear power plant. During his employment at the Karachi Nuclear Power Plant, Butt realised the importance of the welding and nondestructive testing when he co-founded the Pakistan Welding Institute in Islamabad and the Nondestructive testing facility in Taxila.

He eventually moved towards practising mechanical engineering, when he became involved in setting up the standards for welding and machining of the fasteners and other design component parts when he was appointed director at the Atomic Energy Commission in 1984. In 1994, Butt left his plant manager position when he accepted the position as "Member Power" at the corporate offices of the PAEC to advise the Chairman of the PAEC on nuclear power and commercial energy. Butt's experience in machine design components and welding was instrumental in benefiting his country's expansion of nuclear power generation with the Chashma Nuclear Power Plant in Punjab. As Director-General of the Nuclear Power Division at the PAEC, and later its Member of Power, Butt oversaw the design phase and construction of the Chashma Nuclear Power Plant built with the financing provided by China.

== Chairman of the PAEC ==
In 2001, the Musharraf administration announced Butt's appointment as the Chairman of the Pakistan Atomic Energy Commission — this appointment was significant in international media because Butt was not involved in weapons production. In 2003–04, he helped negotiate with China over the financial funding of three more commercial nuclear power plants in Chashma district. In 2006, Butt responded to the lawsuit filed at the Supreme Court of Pakistan by the local residents of Baghalchur, a former uranium exploration mining site and testified at the Supreme Court when he stated: "It is being done in keeping with the international standards for storing nuclear waste".

His role in nuclear power generation in his country was crucial when Butt signed a contract with the International Atomic Energy Agency (IAEA) on 3 September 2004, that mandated that the Pakistan government extensively use nuclear energy for civilian purposes in agriculture, industry, health, education and environment sectors.

With this agreement, Pakistan became the "highest recipient of IAEA's financial and technical assistance" and the relevant international agencies and Islamabad's bilateral supporters were taken into confidence about the application of nuclear energy for civilian purposes. In 2006, Butt submitted a long-term nuclear power plant project to the federal government, which called for the establishment of more civilian nuclear power plants to increase the industrial output of the country.

On 26 March 2006, Butt sought retirement from the chairmanship of the PAEC and accepted a position as a science adviser (local: Federal Secretary), to the Musharraf administration.

== Government work and public advocacy ==
On 4 July 2006, Butt sought retirement from the chairmanship of the PAEC when he rotated the chair of the PAEC to Anwar Ali, a computational physicist. He joined the federal government as a science adviser (local position: Federal Secretary) and served in the Musharraf administration until 2008. Butt was later taken as a policy adviser on nuclear energy by the Gilani administration which he served till 2013. Throughout his career, Butt was honoured with his nation's awards including:

  - Nishan-e-Imtiaz (2015)
  - Hilal-e-Imtiaz (1999)
  - Sitara-e-Imtiaz (1993)

He was an active member of the Board of Government of the World Association of Nuclear Operators (WANO), the World Nuclear Association (WNA) and the International Atomic Energy Agency (IAEA). Butt was elected the Vice-Chair of the IAEA Board of Governors in 2005.

== Death ==
Butt died in Islamabad on 26 July 2026, at the age of 83.

== Research paper ==
- Status and Potential of Small and Medium Power Reactors in Pakistan.

== Awards and honours ==
- Hilal-i-Imtiaz (1999)
- Sitara-i-Imtiaz (1999)
- Tamgha-e-Baqa (2000)
- Nishan-e-Imtiaz (2016)

== Associations ==
- Member of the World Association of Nuclear Operators (WANO)
- Member of World Nuclear Association (WNA)
- Vice Chair of the International Atomic Energy Agency (IAEA) (2005)
- An elected fellow of Pakistan Nuclear Society (1995)

== See also ==
- Nuclear power
