= Ansar Pervaiz =

Pakistani physicist

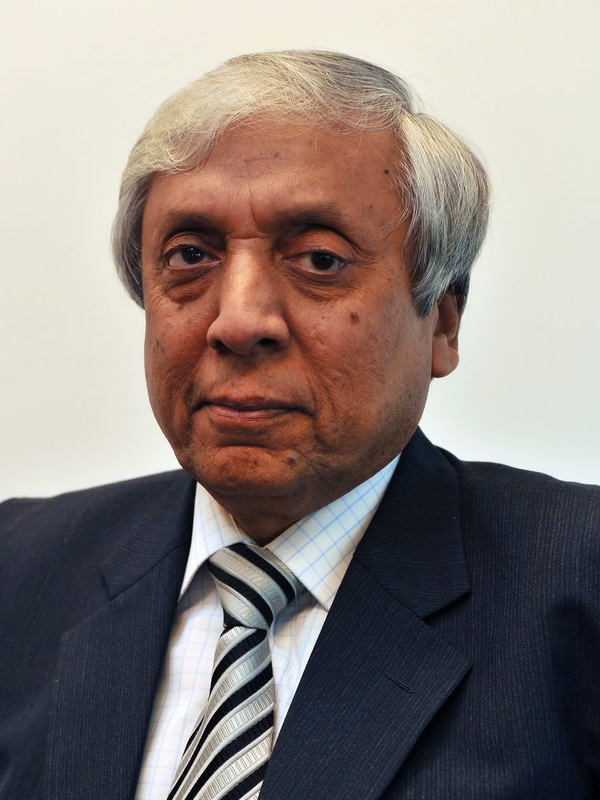
- Born: Lahore, Punjab, Pakistan
- Education: Punjab University; Quaid-e-Azam University; Rensselaer Polytechnic Institute
- Known for: Nuclear power programme
- Awards: Hilal-i-Imtiaz (1998)
- Scientific career
- Fields: Nuclear Engineering
- Workplaces: Pakistan Atomic Energy Commission; International Atomic Energy Agency; Institute of Nuclear Engineering; Institute of Engineering and Applied Science; Institute of Nuclear Science and Technology; Purdue University

Ansar Pervaiz, also spelled as Ansar Parvez, HI, is a Pakistani scientist and a nuclear engineer who was the former chairman of the Pakistan Atomic Energy Commission (PAEC), and former chairman of the Board of Governors of International Atomic Energy Agency (IAEA). Pervaiz is widely given credit for establishing the nuclear engineering, nuclear physics and nuclear technology institutes within Pakistan.

Pervaiz is a strong supporter for peaceful civilian-used nuclear technology in Pakistan whereas he is also supervising the construction of second atomic power plant, Karachi nuclear power plant-II, in Karachi. Pervaiz also established Nuclear medicines centres and cancer research centres in PAEC.

== Life and education ==
Born in Lahore, Ansar Pervaiz received his early and intermediate education there. In 1972, Ansar Pervaiz received his BSc in Physics from Punjab University. The same year, he attended Quaid-e-Azam University, Islamabad where he secured a gold medal followed by a double MSc in physics and Nuclear technology from Quaid-e-Azam University in 1974. In 1974, he went to United States for higher studies where he attended Rensselaer Polytechnic Institute where he received his PhD in Nuclear engineering and Nuclear reactor technology in 1977. He served as visiting assistant professor of both nuclear physics and nuclear technology at Purdue University - West Lafayette, Indiana, U.S. from 1982 until 1984. While at Purdue University, he had more than 30 publications in international journals and proceedings.

== Karachi Nuclear Power Plant ==
In 1986, he came back to Pakistan and joined PAEC as a Principal Scientific Officer (PSO). He formed the nuclear safety group at PAEC. Later, he was transferred in Karachi nuclear power plant, where he was appointed head of the nuclear safety department. At Karachi nuclear power plant, he expertised in nuclear reactor physics, pressure vessel, radioisotope thermoelectric generator (RTG), very high temperature reactor (VHTR), and liquid metal cooled reactor (LMFR). He also established the food processing and agricultural engineering labs at PAEC. In May 1998, he was awarded Hilal-i-Imtiaz by then-Prime Minister of Pakistan, Nawaz Sharif. He also served as a director of KANUPP Institute of Nuclear Power Engineering before promoting as a director general at the Chasma Reactor.

== Pakistan Atomic Energy Commission ==
Parvaiz joined PAEC in 1986. He was put in charge of nuclear technology labs. He worked closely with his fellow nuclear scientist and engineers to plan and set up nuclear power plants of civilian purpose throughout the country. He was a general manager at the Chashma Nuclear Power Unit-II before elevating as a chairman of the agency. In March 2009, he met, together with his fellow engineers and scientists, with Prime Minister Yousaf Raza Gillani where he briefed the Prime Minister about the energy crisis in Pakistan. He was appointed as Project Director of nuclear power plant. In April 2009, he was appointed as PAEC chairman. He is also the chairman of the board of governors of Pakistan Institute of Engineering and Applied Sciences.

== Nuclear power program ==
Pakistan Atomic Energy Commission, under Parvaiz, planned to set up 8800 MW power plants in Pakistan. Pakistan, currently suffering with power shortage and crises, the PAEC unveiled its indigenous plans to set up more nuclear power plants in the country. Pakistan's nuclear power plants were operating well and PAEC was looking forward to installing more nuclear power plants, said by Parvez.
