= Kundian Nuclear Fuel Complex =

Industrial plant in Punjab, Pakistan

The Kundian Nuclear Fuel Complex (KNFC) is a nuclear fuel manufacturing and fabrication plant located in Kundian in Mianwali District, Punjab, Pakistan.

The plant is owned by the Pakistan Atomic Energy Commission (PAEC), which manufactures and, henceforth, supplies the nuclear fuel bundles and reactor cores to the nation's commercial nuclear power plant. It has an annual capacity of producing 24 megatonnes (2.4×10^{10} kg) of natural uranium oxide fuel as well as zirconium alloy cladding and reactor core components.

== History ==
The Kundian Nuclear Fuel Complex was established by the scientists and engineers working at the Pakistan Institute of Nuclear Science & Technology (Pinstech) in 1978. Its establishment came after the Pakistani scientists discovered the heavy amounts of zirconium in the sandy beaches of Balochistan; the facility was established in Kundian in Mianwali District, Punjab, to separate other elements to procure the pure form of zirconium. The nuclear reprocessing and experimental metallurgy of zirconium took place under Pinstech lab in its year early before the technology of nuclear fuel cycle was completely transferred to Kundian Nuclear Fuel Complex.

The Kundian Nuclear Fuel Complex has an annual capacity of producing the 24 megatonnes (2.4×10^{10} kg) of natural uranium oxide fuel, which has allowed the Pakistan Atomic Energy Commission (PAEC) to run the grid operations of the Karachi Nuclear Power Plant (KANUPP) without the Canadian assistance at its full capacity. The Kundian Nuclear Fuel Complex manufactures 1500 Beryllium, Zirconium, and other metal oxide nuclear fuel bundles for Karachi Nuclear Power Plant as well as manufacturing the zirconium alloy cladding and reactor core components.

According to the Pakistani government statistics, the indigenous nuclear fuel had saved Pakistan US$ 40 million per year, with one PAEC mineralogist noting that: "Pakistan produced the first ton of [purified] uranium oxide and metal before it produced the first ton of copper or any other mineral using the local ore and indigenously developed technologies.

The Kundian Nuclear Fuel Complex is located near the location of the Chashma Nuclear Power Plant.

== See also ==
- Nuclear power in Pakistan
