= National Engineering Services Pakistan =

Pakistani energy contractor

National Engineering Services Pakistan (NESPAK)
- Type: Engineering Consulting firm
- Traded as: NESPAK
- Founded: 1973; 53 years ago
- Headquarters: Lahore, Punjab Province, Pakistan
- Number of locations: List: Nationwide Karachi, Islamabad, Quetta, Peshawar International Saudi Arabia, Iran, Afghanistan, Qatar, Oman
- Area served: Worldwide; Nationwide
- Key people: Muhammad Fakhre Alam Irfan, (Chairman, MoE); Muhammad Zargham Eshaq Khan, (President); Nadeem Ashraf (Executive Vice-President); Faisal Majeed (CFO); Board of Governors (MoE)
- Products: Consultancy Services
- Services: List of Services: Project planning; Feasibility study; Detailed Design; Contract Packaging; Tender Documents; Project Management; Water Resource Planning; Dams and Barrages; Irrigation systems; Drainage, Salinity Control and Land Reclamation; Agriculture Development and Allied Fields; Socio-Economic and Impact Evaluation Studies; Groundwater Resources Development; Flood management and Forecasting/Warning Systems; Institutional and Social Development; Road Infrastructure and Master Planning; Pre-feasibility Studies for Route Selection; Soils and Materials Investigation; Geometric Design for Roads and Interchanges; Pavement design; Construction Supervision of Roads/Bridges/Tunnels; Traffic forecasting, Airports; Seaports and Harbours; Technical and Financial Evaluation; Surveys and Investigations Studies; Hydraulic Model Studies; Planning and Layout; Planning for Dredging and Reclamation Work; Harbours and Inland Waterways; Architecture and Planning; Water supply; Sewerage; Solid Waste Management; Plumbing; Industrial Wastes Treatment; Information Technology; Satellite Imagery Interpretation; Map Digitization; Digital Terrain Model; Global Positioning System Survey; GIS Database and Model Development; Geographic analysis; Map production; Software Development; Software requirements specification; Functional specifications documents; LAN/WAN administration; human resources management; Quality assurance; Building Information Modeling
- Revenue: ▲ Rs 11.01 billion(2022–2023)
- Number of employees: 5314
- Parent: Government of Pakistan
- Website: www.nespak.com.pk

The National Engineering Services Pakistan (Urdu: قومی خدماتِ مہندسی پاکستان), commonly known as NESPAK, is a Pakistani state-owned enterprise and energy contractor which provides consulting, construction, engineering, and management services globally. It is one of the largest engineering consultant management companies in Africa and Asia. The company's headquarters is located in Lahore, with offices in Riyadh, Muscat, Tehran, Kabul, Doha and London.

== History ==
Founded in 1973 by the Government of Pakistan, it has undertaken construction, engineering, and management services operations in the country and expanded its operational scope in Central Asia and Africa with completing more than 450 projects worldwide. In 1974, NESPAK established its Project Appraisal and Economic Evaluation Division to handle large-scale structural evaluations. The division was initially headed by Syed Mumtaz Ali, who served as the organization's first Chief Economist from 1974 until 1990, managing frameworks for major national water resource, agriculture, and transport infrastructure projects.

== Projects ==
As of 2016, NES has been contracted to carry out 3,642 projects out of which 3,116 are in Pakistan and 526 are overseas projects with the cumulative cost of projects at $243 billion. Among its projects are the $1.65 billion Lahore Metro, $4 billion Neelum–Jhelum Project, $800 million New Islamabad Airport, $893 million expansion of Salalah Airport in Oman, the $500 million Farah River Dam Project in Afghanistan, as well as managing the Karachi Nuclear Power Plant on behalf of Pakistan Nuclear Regulatory Authority. NESPAK is also managing the supervision of $128 million 15 small dams' project in Western Saudi Arabia and the Obudu Dam project in Nigeria.
