= Ghulam Dastagir Alam =

Pakistani theoretical physicist and professor (1937–2000)

Ghulam Dastagir Alam Qasmi غلام دستگیر عالم قاسمی
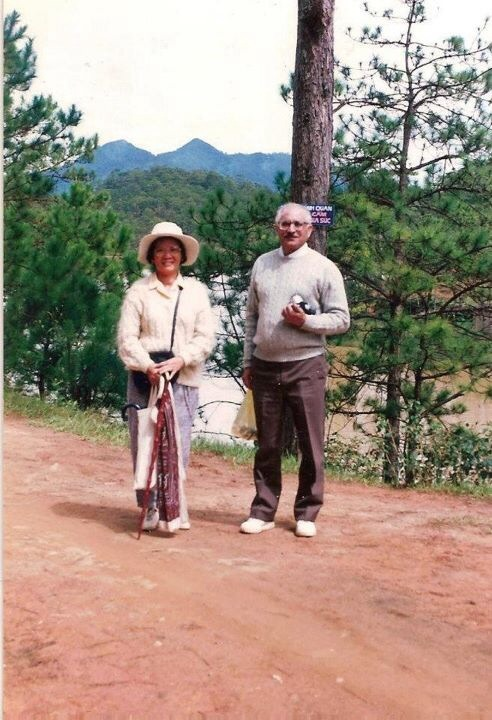
- Dr. G.D Alam (right)
- Born: 1937; Faridabad, Punjab, British India (Present-day in Haryana in India)
- Died: 5 December 2000 (aged 62–63); Nilore, ICT
- Citizenship: Pakistan
- Education: Government College University; Punjab University; University College London
- Known for: Ultracentrifuge development; Quantum Mechanics; Ion Scattering; Published work in Calculus, Fortran and abstract algebra
- Awards: Hilal-e-Imtiaz (1983)
- Scientific career
- Fields: Theoretical physics
- Workplaces: Pakistan Institute of Nuclear Science and Technology; University College London; International Centre for Theoretical Physics; Quaid-e-Azam University
- Theses: Electron capture by multiply charged ions (1967); Charge Transfer Collisions Involving Curve-Crossing (1967)
- Doctoral advisor: J. B. Hasted
- Other academic advisors: Abdus Salam; Rafi Muhammad; Harrie Massey

Ghulam Dastagir Alam Qasmi (Urdu: غلام دستگیر عالم قاسمی; popularly known as G.D. Alam; PhD, HI; 1937 – 5 December 2000), was a Pakistani theoretical physicist and professor of mathematics at the Quaid-e-Azam University. Alam is best known for conceiving and embarking on research on the gas centrifuge during Pakistan's integrated atomic bomb project in the 1970s, and he also conceived the research on charge density, nuclear fission, and gamma-ray bursts throughout his career.

After the atomic bomb project, Alam joined the Department of Mathematics at the Quaid-e-Azam University (QAU) as well as serving as visiting faculty at the Institute of Physics, and co-authored papers on variation calculus and fission isomer. He was one of the notable theoretical physicists at the Pakistan Atomic Energy Commission (PAEC) and QAU. At one point, his fellow theorist, Munir Ahmad Khan, called Alam "the problem solving brain of the PAEC".

== Biography ==
Alam was educated at the Government College University in Lahore where he studied in 1951 and graduated with Bachelor of Science (BSc) in Mathematics in 1955 under the supervision of Abdus Salam–a theoretical physicist. He then went to attend the physics program at the Punjab University where he graduated with Master of Science (MSc) in Physics in 1957, supervised under Dr. Rafi Muhammad– a nuclear physicist.

His thesis titled: The Emission of Electromagnetic Radiations from metals by high energy particles, had contained investigations on electromagnetic radiation emitted from the heavy metals by bombarding the elementary particles.

In 1964, Alam joined the doctoral program in physics at the University College London (UCL) under the Colombo Plan Scholarship, initially joining the doctoral group led by British physicist, John B. Hasted. He learned the course on atomic physics under Harrie Massey and worked on experimental physics under J.B. Hasted. In 1967, he submitted his doctoral thesis supervised by Dr. J.B. Hasted which he defended successfully and graduated with Doctor of Philosophy in theoretical physics. His doctoral thesis, titled: Electron Capture by Multiply Charged Ions, provided scientific investigations on charge-crossing involving potential curve crossing, a concept in quantum mechanics.

In 1967, he published another thesis jointly written by J.B. Hasted and D.K. Bohme on physics of atomic collision and potential energy curves— their work was supported and funded by the United States Department of Defense.

While in the United Kingdom, Alam continued publishing and working on the atomic physics and atomic collisions, collaborating with many other of his British colleagues. However, Alam lost interests in atomic physics and became interested in computer programming and mathematics. In 1970, he published a paper on gamma rays and performed an experiment on isomers, proposing and later proving mathematically that, in the isomer state, the average kinetic energy associated with the decay process of Isomer state is about the same in the ground state of fission.

== Pakistan Atomic Energy Commission ==
=== 1971 war, atomic bomb program, and centrifuge technology ===
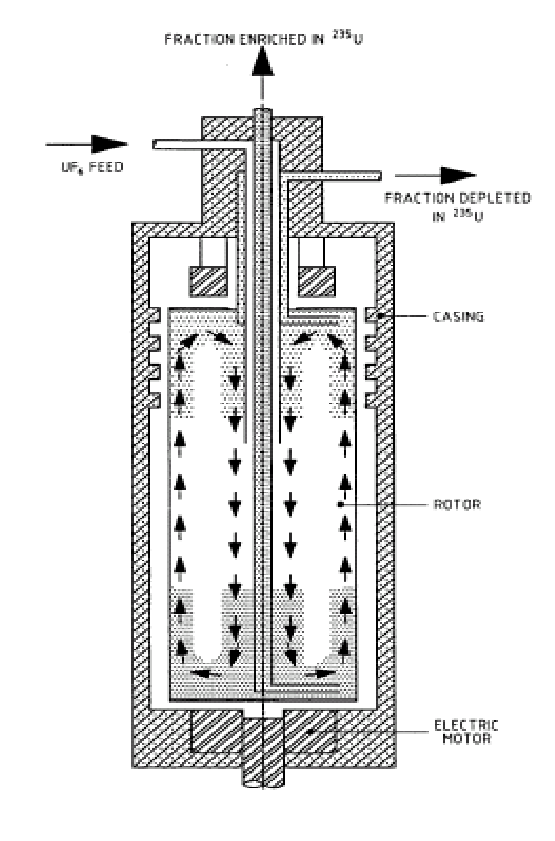
A schematic of gas centrifuge employed in the United States, copyright by U.S. NRC. In 1970s, Alam had conceived a concept of gas centrifuge independent of A.Q. Khan's Urenco-based designs.

In 1958, Alam joined the Pakistan Atomic Energy Commission as a researcher, and was directed to join the Institute of Nuclear Science and Technology (PINSTECH), the national laboratory site in Nilore, in 1970. During the war with India in 1971, Alam became interested in computing and mathematics, briefly writing a computer program while working in problems relating to logic and the mathematics. Alam was instrumental in establishing the computer department at the Institute of Nuclear Science and Technology before moving to join the Physics Division.

Alam originally was not part of the team that was investigating the uranium enrichment under Bashiruddin Mahmood in 1974 and had not seen a gas centrifuge albeit of rudimentary knowledge from the work done by Jesse Beams, an American, in 1940s. In 1974–76, Alam directed a separate electromagnetic separation program at the Airport Development Works setup at the Chaklala Air Force Base and begin working on the applications of magnetism and magnetic bearing. Eventually other physicists such as Fakhr Hashmi, Javed Arshad Mirza, Eqbal Ahmad Khokhar, and Anwar Ali joined his Airport Development Works facility— thus forming the centrifuge program under Alam.

In 1976, Alam was asked to review the components and the blueprints of a gas centrifuge brought by Abdul Qadeer Khan for analysis, which he later identified as incorrect and incomplete to the PAEC. During this time, he held discussion with Abdul Qadeer Khan on copper metallurgy which was nascent to his development of centrifuge at the Airport Development Works facility. Meanwhile, Alam accepted and joined the faculty of mathematics at the Quaid-e-Azam University and met with Tasneem Shah, an Oxford University PhD graduate in mathematics, degelating Shah to join the centrifuge program. Alam and Shah performed mathematical calculations for linearly approximating the reasonable percent error for the actual value of military-grade uranium that proved the Abdul Qadeer Khan's estimation required to enriched the uranium.

In April 1976, Alam succeeded in designing a gas centrifuge and succeeded in rotating the first centrifuge to 30,000 rpm by perfectly balancing and rotating around fixed axis of the centrifuge— Alam and his team was immediately dispatched at the Khan Research Laboratories under Abdul Qadeer Khan. At KRL, Alam and Shah worked on solving differential equation problems relating the gas centrifuges, and designed a first generation of centrifuges, known as P1, that succeeded in separating the U^{234}, U^{235}, and U^{238} isotopes from raw natural uranium under supervision of Shah, Alam, and Qadeer Khan. Commenting on the success, Alam famously quoted: "Boys, we have achieved enrichment in Pakistan." Following this success, Alam and other colleagues signed and quickly published a paper on the differential methods of the centrifuges in 1978–79.

Alam remained associated with the centrifuge program and was its design director until 1981 when he developed intellectual differences with Abdul Qadeer Khan in 1981. He was confided by Abdul Qadeer Khan about selling the centrifuge technology to unknown Arab country, which he vehemently opposed the idea on the ground that India (a competitor in that field) might be benefited from that technology. After this incident, Alam was transferred to PAEC where he remained associated with the electromagnetic separation program under Dr. Shaukat Hameed Khan, and decided to work on the partial differential equations.

Alam went to join the Quaid-i-Azam University and briefly taught courses on calculus, and published a computer model on HIV rate of infection along with American scientists. At the Department of Mathematics, Alam pioneered a paper in Gamma-ray bursts using mathematical descriptions to analyse the energy released by the gamma rays. Alam died on 5 December 2000 in his residence in Islamabad.

== Books ==
- Qadir, Asghar; Faheem Hussain; Riazuddin, M.; Jamil Aslam & Hamid Saleem (June 2007) [1999], "Quantum nonlocality, Black Holes and Quantum Gravity", Mathematical physics Proceedings of the 12th Regional Conference, vol. 1 (1 ed.), National Center for Theoretical Physics, Islamabad: World Scientific Publications Co. Pte. Lmtd, pp. 382–400, ISBN 978-981-270-591-4
- Qasmi, Ghulam Dastigar Alam (April 1996) [1996], Calculus: An Approach to Engineering Mathematics, 1, vol. 1 (1 ed.), Department of Mathematics, Quaid-e-Azam University: Punjab Textbook Board, p. 390

== Science articles ==
- Fission fragment mass distributions and kinetic energies for spontaneous fission isomers, by R.L. Ferguson, F. Plasil, G.D. Alam†, H.W. Schmitt.
- Gamma Ray Transitions in the de-excitation Californium-253 spontenous fission pragments, by G.D. Alam, Department of Mathematics.

== Bibliography ==

- Shahidur Rehman (1999). Long Road to Chagai:§ Gas centrifuge controversy§Pakistan nuclear technology project: from Pakistan's Theoretical Physics to the making of the bomb. Pakistan, UK: Printwise Publications. p. 157.
- Levy, Adrian; Scott-Clark, Catherine (2007). Deception: Pakistan, the United States, and the Secret Trade in Nuclear Weapons. New York: Walker & Co./Holtzbrinck. p. 586. ISBN 978-0-8027-1554-8.
- Albright, David (2010). Peddling Peril§ Its Just Business. United States: Free Press. p. 296. ISBN 978-1-4165-4931-4.
