= Muhammad Naeem (physicist) =

Pakistani nuclear scientist (born 1949)

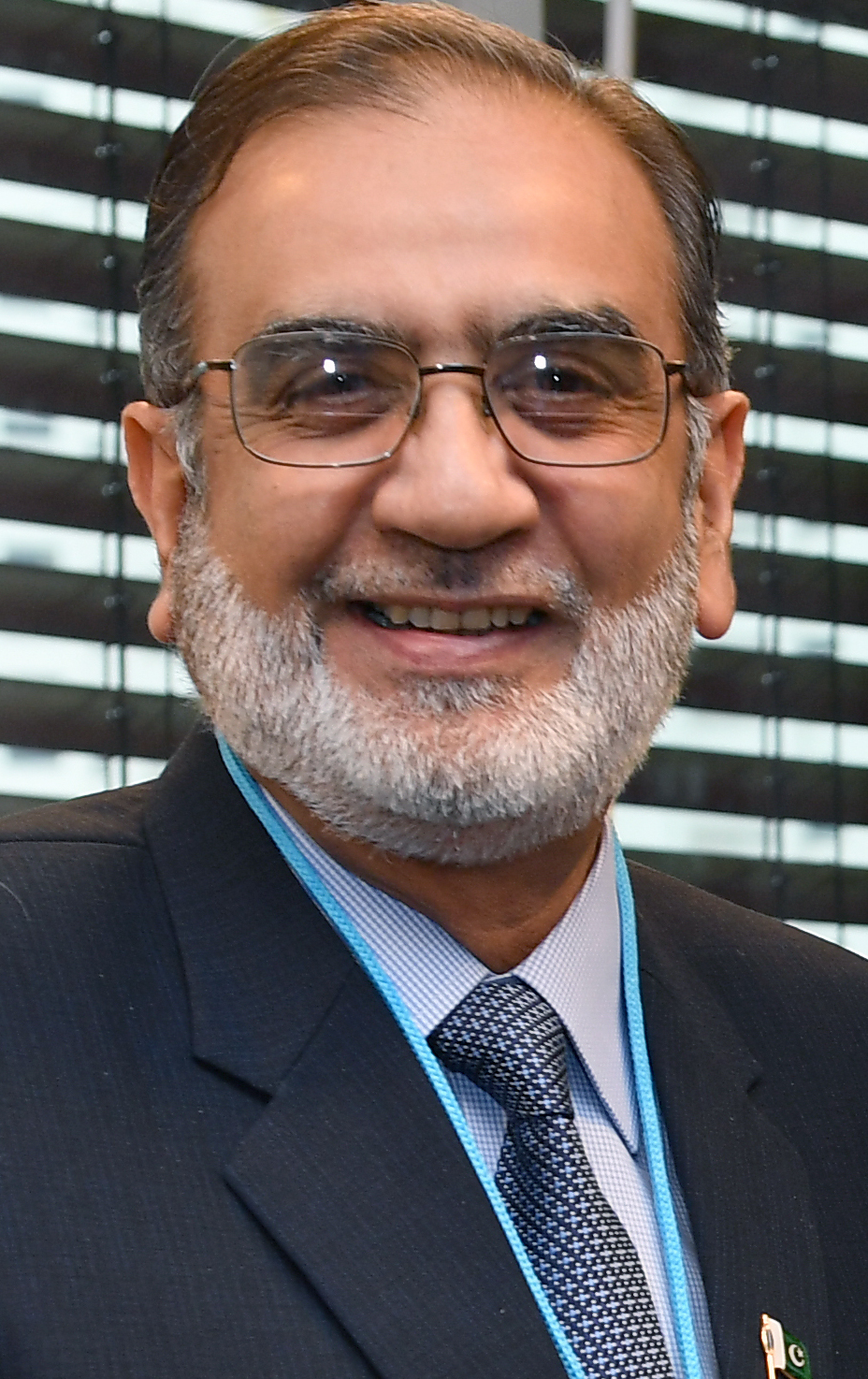
- Naeem in 2017
- Born: October 1, 1949 (age 75); Lahore, Pakistan
- Scientific career
- Fields: Nuclear Engineering
- Institutions: Pakistan Atomic Energy Commission

Muhammad Naeem (born October 1, 1949) is a Pakistani nuclear scientist who was the chairman of the Pakistan Atomic Energy Commission (PAEC). He is also the current chairman of the Board of Governors of Pakistan Institute of Engineering and Applied Sciences (PIEAS).
