= PNRA =

PNRA may refer to:

- National Antarctic Research Program (Italian: Programma Nazionale di Ricerche in Antartide), the Italian Antarctic research program
- Pakistan Nuclear Regulatory Authority, Pakistan's federal agency responsible for nuclear regulation
- Panera Bread, a chain of bakery-café fast casual restaurants
