= Anwar Ali (physicist) =

Pakistani physicist and a computer programmer

- Born: 1943 (age 82–83); Hoshiarpur, Punjab, British Indian Empire (Present-day in Hoshiarpur, Punjab in India)
- Citizenship: Pakistan
- Education: Government College University; University of Punjab; University of Birmingham
- Known for: Pakistan's nuclear deterrent program Computational science, automatic controls, and computer programming
- Awards: Nishan-i-Imtiaz (2015); Pride of Performance (2003); Hilal-i-Imtiaz (1999)
- Scientific career
- Fields: Computational physics
- Institutions: Pakistan Atomic Energy Commission

Anwar Ali (born 1943) is a Pakistani physicist and a computer programmer, who served as the Chairman of the Pakistan Atomic Energy Commission (PAEC) from 2006 until 2009. His scientific career is spent at the Pakistan Atomic Energy Commission as a computational physicist and played a key scientific role his nation's secret nuclear deterrent program.

== Biography ==
=== Early life ===
Ali, an Indian native from Hoshiarpur, completed his undergraduate studies at the Government College University in Lahore and earned a BSc in physics. He participated in the physics master's program at Punjab University, where he earned a Master of Science (MSc) in the subject. He studied nuclear physics at the University of Birmingham, where he received his MSc.

He was pursuing a doctorate in physics at the University of Birmingham in 1972 when he learnt of India's nuclear test, known as "Smiling Buddha," which took place on 18 May 1974.

=== Pakistan Atomic Energy Commission ===
A representation of the multidisciplinary nature of computational physics both as an overlap of physics, mathematics, and computer science and as a bridge among them.

After his graduation from Punjab University, Ali found employment with the Pakistan Atomic Energy Commission (PAEC) in 1967, as a scientific officer at the Atomic Energy Center in Lahore. He joined the Nuclear Engineering Division alongside Bashiruddin Mahmood, an engineer, and aided in the investigations on the uranium enrichment under Bashiruddin Mahmood in May 1974. Ali was an original member of the uranium investigation team,, that was working with Mahmood as a principal investigator, under advice from Abdul Qadeer Khan. Ali was posted back to Engineering Division of the PAEC after Abdul Qadeer Khan took over the program after moving it at the Khan Research Laboratories in Kahuta.

In 1978, Ali joined the Airport Development Works— a separate facility working on electromagnetic separation of uranium isotopes. Independent from Khan Research Laboratories— functioning under its director, Dr. G.D. Alam, at the Chaklala Air Force Base and assisted Alam in designing of the centrifuge and further in computer programming to control the rotation of the centrifuge. There, Ali learned computer programming from Alam who had also taught him about the automatic controls after being posted at the Khan Research Laboratories in 1981. Eventually, Ali lost interest in nuclear physics but found himself working in computer coding and researching on the topics and applications involving the fluid dynamics in the computational physics.

In 1982, Ali was in brief conflict with Abdul Qadeer Khan when he was confided about the latter about selling the centrifuge technology to unknown Arab country, and may have been the one who alerted the Zia administration to Khan's motive. Following this incident, Ali was transferred at the Directorate of Industrial Liaison until 1985 when he was posted at the Directorate of Technical Development (DTD) where he found himself working as a computer programmer, and aided in developing computer codes for the launch sequences of the missiles. In 1993, Ali accepted the employment with the National Defence Complex, a rocket engine contractor, and played a key role in designing the satellite-based inertial guidance and control system of the Shaheen-I missile system. In 1996, Ali went to join the DTD, and helped write the computer codes for the nuclear devices— he was part of the computer programming team that design the codes for the nuclear devices, codenamed: Chagai-I.

In 1998, Ali was the Director of the Computation at the Atomic Energy Commission and eye-witnessed the nuclear testing at Chagai Hills, and reportedly quoted: "Pakistan has successfully detonated the device and we have made a series of experiments and they have been very successful and the results were as we were expecting and in this series there were six experiments." In 1999, Ali was honored with Hilal-e-Imtiaz (Trans. Star of Excellence) by the President of Pakistan, and remained associated with his nation's strategic program, namely the Shaheen missile system.

In 2002, Ali was appointed as chief technical officer —local corporate designation: Member (Technical)— at the PAEC, and was rumored to become director of the Khan Research Laboratories (KRL), which was rebuffed by the Government in 2004. Ali, who had been the most senior scientist at the PAEC, was confirmed for the appointment of the chairmanship of the Atomic Energy Commission when the Government of Pakistan announced at the news media on 28 March 2006. Upon taking over the chairmanship, Ali announced that the PAEC has also promoted the utilization of nuclear technologies in other areas, such as agricultural production and for medical diagnosis and therapy. Ali, as chairman of the PAEC, provided strong advocacy for expansion of the commercial nuclear plants to the Government of Pakistan."

On 27 January 2006, Anwar Ali, received an invitation letter to visit CERN– a particle physics facility in Switzerland– where Ali and Robert Aymar negotiated an agreement between PAEC and CERN to provide financial, technical, and scientific support in the field of novel accelerator, collimator, particle detector and information technologies, as well as through the training and education of scientists and engineers. Under this agreement, Pakistan upgraded the Compact Muon Solenoid and the Large Hadron Collider by designing and developing the particle accelerators as its lead contractor at the CERN.

On 5 April 2009, Ali, rumored to be given extension from his three-year chairmanship, was confirmed for his retirement from the PAEC and was succeeded by Dr. Ansar Pervaiz on 7 April 2009.

== Awards and honors ==
- Hilal-i-Imtiaz (1999)
- Pride of Performance (2003)
- Nishan-i-Imtiaz (2015)
- Scientist Emeritus

== See also ==
- Computational physics

== Sources ==
- https://web.archive.org/web/20131003001554/http://cns.miis.edu/other/wmdi060504b.htm
- http://www.wmdinsights.org/I5/SA1_NewHeadOfPakistan.htm
- Collaboration
- Anwar ali
