= Islamabad Uranium Conversion Facility =

Uranium conversion facility in Islamabad, Pakistan

The Uranium Conversion Facility in Islamabad is a uranium conversion site in Islamabad, Pakistan. The plant is owned by the Pakistan Atomic Energy Commission and has a nominal capacity of producing uranium hexafluoride (UF_{6}).

Despite its existence being known since 1990 following investigations by the United States government, there are no official reports of its operations by the Government of Pakistan and about the technical data of the facility.

== Overview ==
Believed to be built between 1974–76, the Uranium Conversion Facility is the only uranium hexafluoride conversion facility in Pakistan. The facility is known for its many names such as POF Uranium Conversion Facility by Federation of American Scientists (FAS) and other sources. The plant feeds U_{3}O_{8} yellowcake received from local uranium mines and produces uranium hexafluoride gas for enrichment at one of the primary enrichment sites around the Pakistan. After being enriched, product is fabricated into nuclear fuel used for generating electricity at a nuclear power plant.

For such purposes, the facility employs unique vacuum technology, which was imported from East Germany (possibly via Leybold GmbH), to process by which it converts powdered yellowcake into uranium tetrafluoride (UF_{4}) to uranium trioxide (UO_{3}), and uranium dioxide (urania) to convert to uranium hexafluoride (UF_{6}) gas.

Despite operating in secrecy, the uranium conversion facility was identified by the United States' Export Administration Regulations (EAR) for export controls in 1999.
