= Karachi Institute of Power Engineering =

Graduate engineering school in Karachi, Pakistan

The Karachi Institute of Power Engineering, commonly known as KINPOE, is a post-graduate applied science school of the Institute of Engineering and Applied Sciences. Established by the Pakistan Atomic Energy Commission (PAEC) in 1993 with cooperation with the NED University of Engineering and Technology in Karachi, the school grants the post-graduate degrees and training certifications in power engineering related disciplines. The school is located near the vicinity of the Karachi Nuclear Power Complex (KANUPP-II) near at Paradise Point in Karachi, Pakistan.

== See also ==
- List of Universities in Pakistan
