= Paradise Point, Pakistan =

Rock formation and beach in Karachi, Pakistan

Coordinates: 24.843757°N 66.776323°E

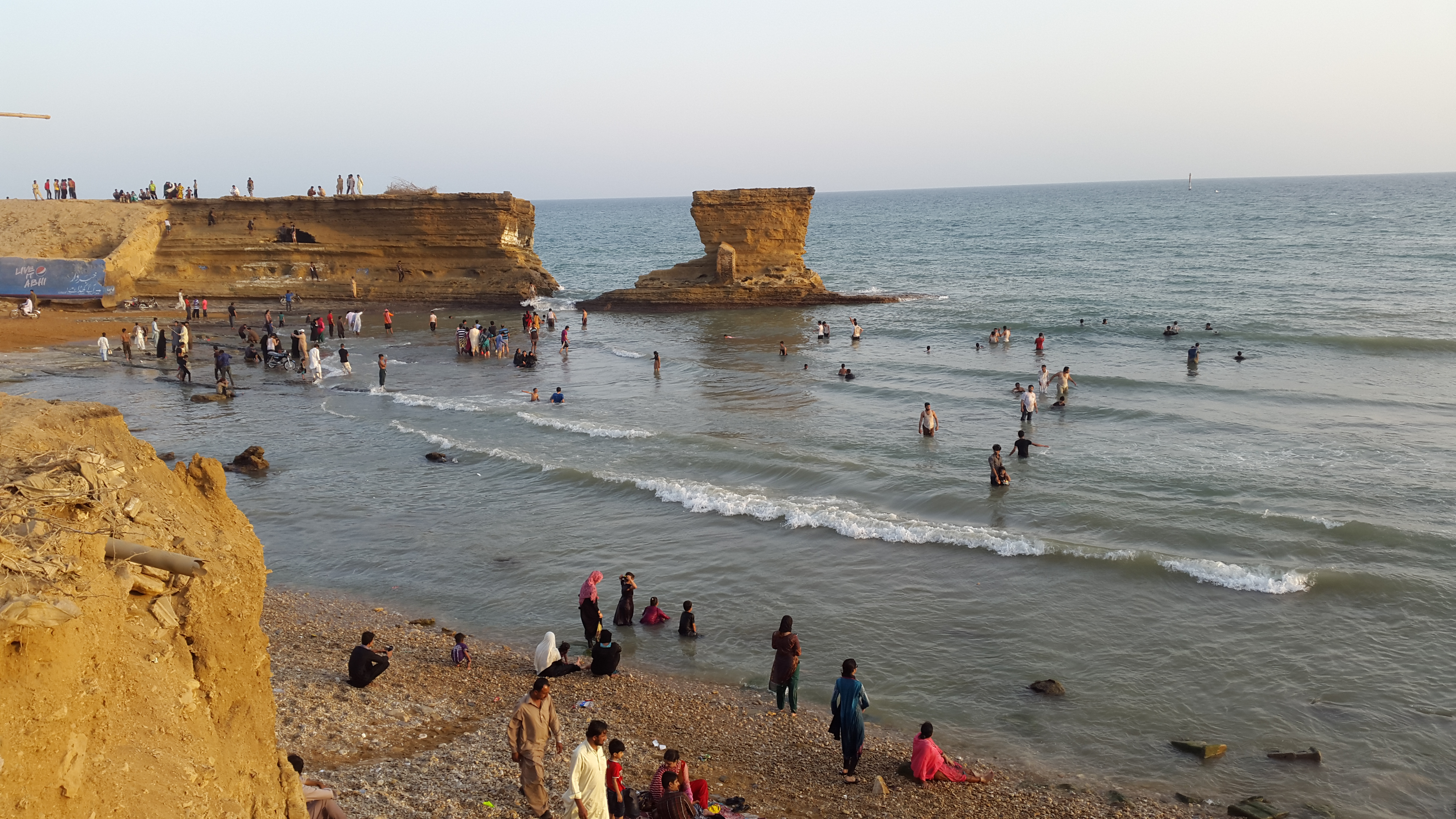
The Paradise Point in 2015.

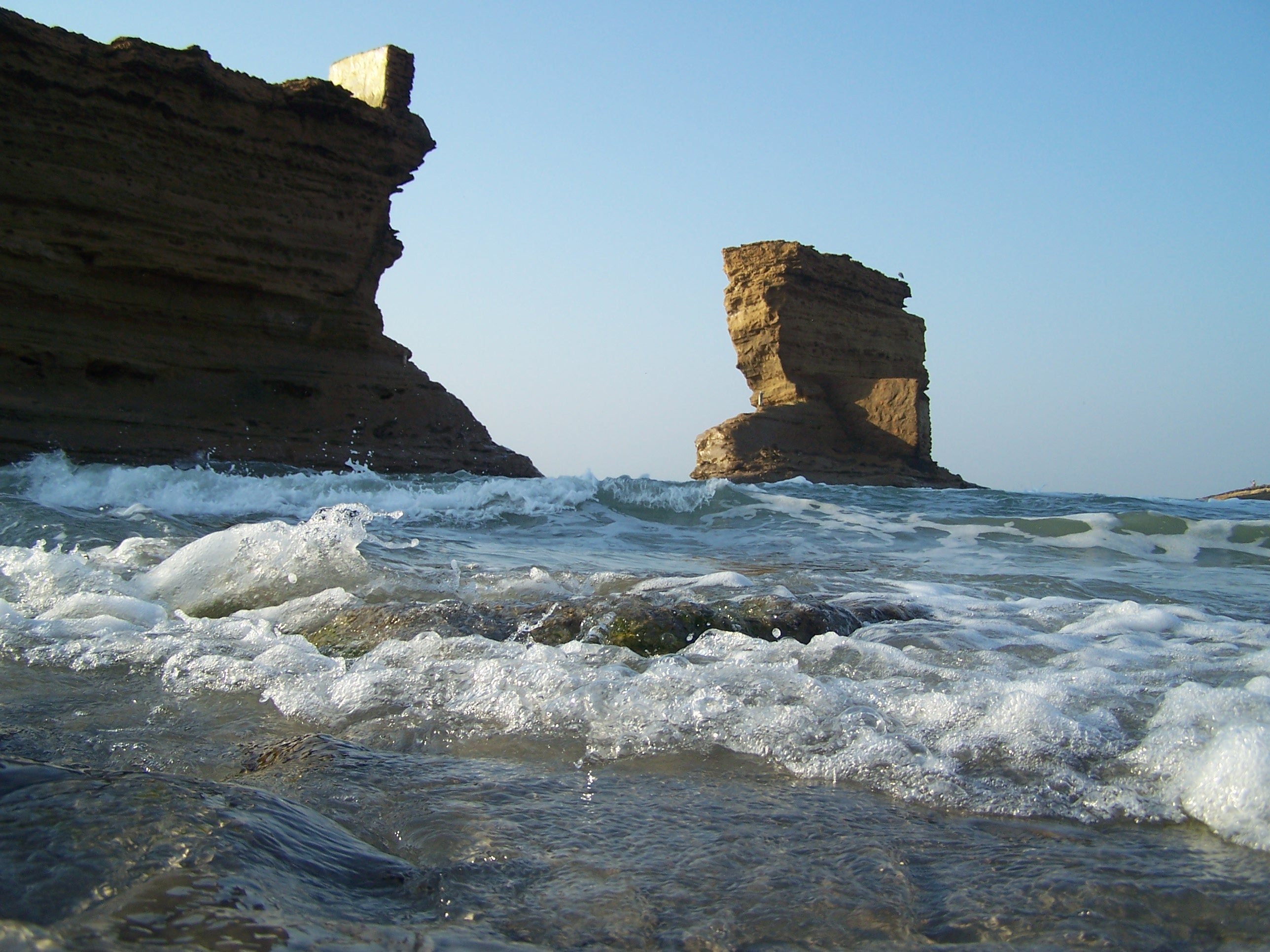
Paradise Point in 2007.

The Paradise Point is a beach on the Arabian Sea and a reservation of the Pakistan Atomic Energy Commission located in Karachi District, Sindh, Pakistan. Paradise Point is a sandstone rock formation which once had a natural arch.

Due to the security concerns and vulnerability relating to the Karachi Nuclear Power Complex at the Paradise Point, the beach was closed for tourism when the Ministry of Energy acquired the reservation on behalf of the federal government of Pakistan in 2017.

Before 2017, the Paradise Point was a main point of attraction for the tourists, which offered the beachside horse and camel rides, amusement parks, restaurants, and swimming in the Arabian Sea. The Paradise Point Beach is accessible through the Hawkes Bay Road or the Mubarak Goth Road from downtown of Karachi. To its west, the Nathiagali Beach is located.

Other beaches close to the city include Sandspit Beach, Hawke's Bay, and Clifton Beach.

== Karachi Nuclear Power Plant ==
The vicinity of the Paradise Point is a site where the commercial Karachi Nuclear Power Plant is located. Due to the security concerns and potential for attacks, the federal government of Pakistan allowed the Ministry of Energy to acquire the area and is designated as a reservation of the Pakistan Atomic Energy Commission, which closed the beach for tourism and clearance is required to visit and for an entry to the beach.

== See also ==
- Karachi Nuclear Power Plant
