= Circular debt =

Power Companies Public Debt in Pakistan

In Pakistan, circular debt is a public debt that is a cascade of unpaid government subsidies, which results in the accumulation of debt on distribution companies. When this happens, the distribution companies cannot pay independent power producers, who in turn are unable to pay fuel-providing companies, thus creating the debt effect as seen in the country.

Circular debt started accumulating in Pakistan from 2006. While successive governments have attempted to reduce it burdens via a series of regular payments, they have been unable to control the inflow of new debt.

As of July 2024, the total circular debt of Pakistan was Rs. 5,730 billion. As of 30 June 2025, it stood at Rs. 1.6 trillion.
