= Multan Heavy Water Production Facility =

The Heavy Water Production Facility in Multan is a heavy water production site located in Multan, Punjab, Pakistan. The plant, owned by the Pakistan Atomic Energy Commission, has a nominal capacity of producing 13 metric tons (29,000 lb) of heavy water per year.

The federal Government of Pakistan has not published any reports about the facility but its existence is known through literary investigations.

== Historical background ==
Planning of constructing a heavy water facility began in 1958 when Pakistan Atomic Energy Commission (PAEC) made a proposal to Pakistan Industrial Development Corporation (PIDC) for funding support– it was deferred due to Ministry of Finance (MoF) and PIDC had prioritizing the hydropower over nuclear power. Initially, this plant would use by-product from a nearby fertilizer plant and would produce 50 kilograms (0.050 t) of heavy water per day. Eventually, the PAEC built the plant on its own and secured funding from the Pak Arab Fertilizer– a private sector limited company. This plant was to be used for energy production using nuclear power in addition to understand more advanced science involving the properties of water.

The Deuterium oxide (or heavy water) is important for plutonium production since it is often used moderator in reactor that uses natural uranium. The heavy water molecule consists of one oxygen atom and two deuterium atoms– an isotope of hydrogen having an extra neutron in its nucleus. Though it occurs naturally, but it extremely rare, accounting only one in three thousand water molecules. The heavy water allows natural uranium to be used in reactor cores as opposed to enriched uranium which is expensive, time consuming and difficult to do. However, the isotope separation of water requires large facilities, finances, and technical support.

The PAEC discussed the plant with Germany, France, and Canada with proposing this facility under regular IAEA inspection– all had ejected from the proposal in 1974. Eventually, Belgium was a more willing partner that helped Pakistan constructing the plant but this facility cannot produce the heavy water requires to produce the weapon-grade plutonium and it is only used for its original mission envisioned in 1958. The Multan Heavy Water Production Facility is not subject to IAEA inspection but its secure operations and security is professed by the Government of Pakistan through its federal oversight agencies.

== Fertilizer plant ==
Inside the Multan Heavy Water Production Facility, the Pak Arab Fertilizer (pvt) Ltd. operates a fertilizer factory with an annual output capacity of between 140,000 and 117,000 tons of ammonium nitrate, while a smaller fertilizer plant has an annual output capacity of 43,000 tons of urea.

== See also ==
- Heavy water
