= Pakistan Nuclear Regulatory Authority =

Pakistani government agency

- PNRA
- Official logo of PNRA.

Agency overview
- Formed: 22 January 2001; 25 years ago
- Preceding agency: Atomic Energy Commission
- Type: Regulatory
- Jurisdiction: Government of Pakistan
- Headquarters: Islamabad, Pakistan
- Motto: Ensuring Protection from Ionizing Radiation
- Annual budget: FY-26 federal budget
- Agency executive: Faisan Mansoor, SI Chairman
- Key document: PNRA Ordnance, 2001
- Website: www.pnra.org/index.html

The Pakistan Nuclear Regulatory Authority (PNRA) is an independent federal agency of the Government of Pakistan tasked with protecting public health and safety related to radiation and nuclear energy in Pakistan.

Established as one of two successor agencies to the Pakistan Atomic Energy Commission (PAEC), its functions includes overseeing reactor safety and security, administering reactor licensing and renewal, licensing and oversight for fuel cycle facilities, licensing radioactive materials, radionuclide safety, and managing the storage, security, recycling, and disposal of spent fuel.

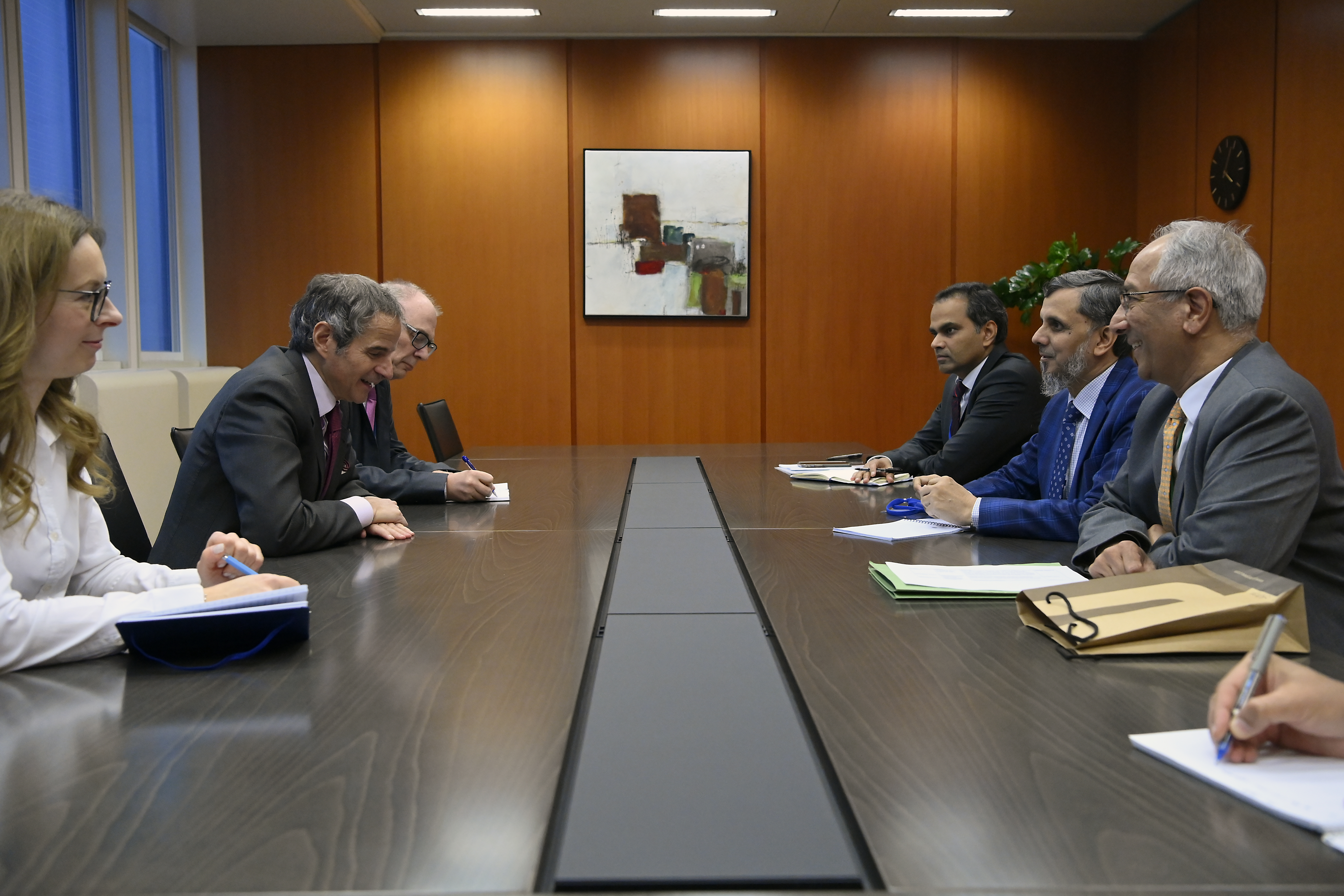
The IAEA delegation, led by Rafael Grossi, meeting with PNRA Chairman Faizan Mansoor and officials in 2023.

== History ==
After the commission of the PARR-I research reactor in 1965, and the KANUPP-I nuclear power reactor in 1972 in Pakistan, the Pakistan Atomic Energy Commission (PAEC) had the regulatory oversight to ensure the safe usage of the nuclear technology and safe radiation practices.

In 1984, the Government of Pakistan promulgated the "Pakistan Nuclear Safety and Radiation Protection Ordinance 1984", which expanded the Atomic Energy Commission's regulatory control to oversee nuclear energy matters, oversight of nuclear medicines, and nuclear safety and security. This enacting of law eventually lead to the Atomic Energy Commission establishing the "Directorate of Nuclear Safety and Radiation Protection" (DNSRP). The directorate undertook the research and promotion of safe civilian uses of radioactive materials and medicines while the nuclear power development was entrusted with the Directorate of Nuclear Power. The Atomic Energy Commission itself held the responsibility for research and development as well as oversight of the nuclear weapons.

On 20 September 1994, Pakistan signed the international Convention on Nuclear Safety which made it compulsory for the Government of Pakistan to establish an independent regulatory governing body. With the ratification confirmed on 29 December 1997, the Atomic Energy Commission organized the Nuclear Regulatory Board as a tranistionary measure to oversee the regulatory matters while the Government of Pakistan worked towards setting up federal and independent regulatory agency.

On 22 January 2001, Board was dissolved when the Pakistan Nuclear Regulatory Authority (PNRA) was officially established as a federal independent regulatory authority with expanded responsibilities of oversee nuclear energy matters, issuance of the licenses and permits, waste transportation and disposal, oversight of nuclear medicines development, and the overall reactor nuclear safety and security. The National Command Authority (NCA) was also established and created that overtook the responsibility of the nuclear weapons from the Pakistan Atomic Energy Commission (PAEC).

The first chairman of the Pakistan Nuclear Regulatory Authority (PNRA), Jamshed Azim Hashmi, a mechanical engineer, oversaw the formative years and headed the agency until retiring in 2009 when Anwar Habib was appointed for the chairmanship. In 2017, Dr. Zaheer Ayub Baig, a physicist, was appointed as the chairman of the PNRA who took the role after outgoing and retiring chairman, Anwar Habib. As of 2026, Faizan Mansoor, a civil engineer with nuclear safety experience, is the fourth and the current chairman of the PNRA who took over the chairmanship from Dr. Baig in 2021.

== Mission and chairmen ==
The PNRA's primary mission and objective is to protect the public health, environmental safety and the advances in nation's defense from radiation-related events by enabling the safe and secure usage of civilian nuclear energy technologies and management of the radioactive materials through efficient and reliable licensing, oversight, and regulation for the benefit of society and the environment.

There are three main areas that the PNRA is mandated:

- Reactors – Commercial nuclear power plants for generating electric power and research reactors used for research, testing, and overall training.
- Materials – Uses of nuclear materials in medical, industrial, and academic settings and facilities that produce nuclear fuel.
- Waste – Transportation, storage, and disposal of nuclear materials and waste, and decommissioning of nuclear facilities from nation's service.

The PNRA is headed by the Chairman who is appointed and confirmed by the President of Pakistan on the nomination sent by the Prime Minister of Pakistan. The Chairman is then assisted by the two full members designated as executive and corporate.

No.	Name (chair)	Photo	Term of office		Notes	Appointed by
1	J. Azim Hashmi, H.I.		2001	2009		Pervez Musharraf
2	Anwar Habib, H.I.		2009	2017		Asif Zardari
3	Zaheer Baig, H.I.		2017	2021		Mamnoon Hussain
4	Faizan Mansoor, S.I.		2021	Present		Arif Alvi

== Organization ==
The Pakistan Nuclear Regulatory Authority (PNRA) consists of appointed chairman who is assisted by the two full-time members on one hand while seven part-time members on the other with one-member is an active-duty military personnel to represent the security matters. Each full-time member is assisted by the director-generals who are responsible for running multiple and various directorates with each has its own directors concerning the safe usafe of nuclear power, overseeing legal matters, physical protection of nuclear materials, finances, training and education, and personnel development.

=== Region ===
The PNRA territorial jurisdiction is divided into four regions and fifth region covering the north. In Islamabad, Chashma, and Karachi, the PNRA maintains the Regional Nuclear Safety Directorates (RNSD); while the PNRA has Regional Nuclear Safety Inspectorate (RNSI) in different areas four provices of the country.

In these four RSND regions, the PNRA oversees the operation of Pakistani nuclear reactors, namely the power-producing reactors, and non-power-producing, or research and test reactor in RNSI regions.

== Recordkeeping, training and education ==
The PNRA has a library, which also contains online document collections and technical reports, and are reported to the IAEA on a regular basis.

The PNRA sponsors and provides certificate trainings to the Pakistani nationals only on nuclear power, engineering, physics, and overall nuclear power operations, which are accredited by the Pakistan Engineering Council and other education regulators.

The funding for the engineering and physics training courses and certifications are provided by the federal government of Pakistan as means of scholarships and instructions are conducted at the Institute of Power Engineering at the Karachi Nuclear Power Complex, Centre of Nuclear Training at Chasma Nuclear Power Complex, and other Atomic Energy Commission sites.

== International outreach ==
ICD liaises with other governmental departments regarding visits of experts coming to PNRA from the IAEA and, through bilateral agreements, from other regulatory bodies. It coordinates with Pakistani Embassies abroad for visas, concerned government departments for security matters, PAEC and IAEA.

== See also ==
- Pakistan Nuclear Society
