= Canadian General Electric =

Canadian multinational conglomerate

- Industry: electrical
- Predecessor: Edison Electric Light Company of Canada; Thomson-Houston Electric Light Company of Canada
- Founded: 15 July 1892
- Defunct: 1989; 37 years ago
- Fate: Re-named as GE Canada in 1989
- Successor: GE Canada
- Headquarters: Toronto, Ontario, Canada
- Area served: Canada
- Products: consumer appliances, electric equipment
- Website: www.ge.com/ca/

GE Canada (or General Electric Canada) is the wholly-owned Canadian unit of General Electric, manufacturing various consumer and industrial electrical products all over Canada.

GE Canada was preceded by the company Canadian General Electric (CGE), a Canadian manufacturer of various electrical products which acted as the Canadian counterpart of the American company General Electric. CGE became General Electric Canada in 1989, and is now known as GE Canada.

== History ==
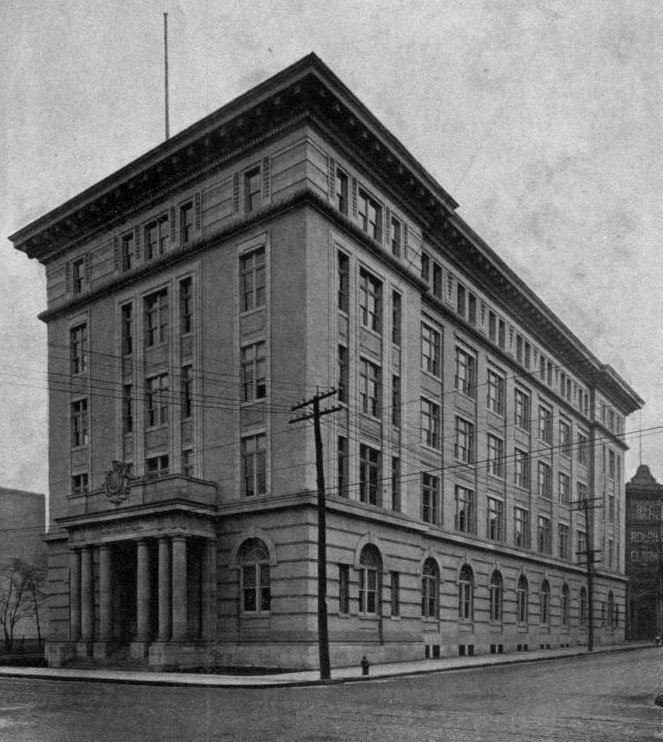
The company's 1908 headquarters building at 212 King Street W in Toronto, designed by Darling and Pearson

Canadian General Electric Co. Limited (CGE) was incorporated in Canada in 1892 as a merger of Edison Electric Light Company of Canada (of Hamilton, Ontario) and Thomson-Houston Electric Light Company of Canada (of Montreal, Quebec), both incorporated in Canada in 1882.

The Canadian merger occurred in the same year as the merger of parent companies Edison General Electric (of Schenectady, New York) and Thomson-Houston Company (of Lynn, Massachusetts) into General Electric, which continues to the present day as a major international conglomerate.

CGE had about 500 employees at inception and was already producing generators, transformers, motors, wire and cable, and lighting products for consumer and industrial products.

CGE existed as the Canadian counterpart of the American-based General Electric. In 1989, CGE became General Electric Canada, and is now known as GE Canada.

=== Milestones ===
General Electric has had a long manufacturing history in Canada, beginning as CGE and existing today as GE Canada. In 1892, CGE is founded and opens engine/motor plant in Peterborough, Ontario. Between 1892 and 1899, the Canadian General Electric electric car is produced, for model year 1899 only, in Peterborough. The car is essentially a Woods Electric.

In 1911, CGE acquired Sunbeam Lamp company of Toronto, Ontario. In 1912, the company established a lamp plant in Montreal, Quebec. In 1921, vacuum tube operations began in Toronto. In 1922, Canadian Edison Appliance Company was established.

In 1945, the company opened a small appliances plant in Barrie, Ontario. The next year, a plastics plant was opened in Cobourg, Ontario and a lighting plant was opened in Oakville, Ontario. In 1947, the company opened an electric meter plant in Quebec city.

In 1971, the Karachi Nuclear Power Complex, built by CGE, opens. In 1975, CGE's household appliance division merged with GSW Inc, a Canadian manufacturer of household appliances with brands such as McClary, Easy, and Moffat, the two companies merged to form Camco (later known as Mabe Canada). In 1989, CGE became wholly owned by General Electric, and was renamed General Electric Canada.

In the 1990s, electric lamp operations in the Oakville factory slowly began to get transferred to lamp plants in Warren, Ohio, and Winchester, Virginia (now closed). Most fluorescent tube operations ceased by the late 1990s. In 2009, most incandescent lamp production lines in the Oakville plant were stopped. Production is transferred to Winchester, Virginia.

The Oakville lamp plant closed in 2010 and the remaining incandescent lamp operations were transferred to Mexico and China. A few products were outsourced from Sylvania's US plants. T8 fluorescent tube operations go to Bucyrus, Ohio.

In 2018, the Peterborough plant shutdown and a gas engine plant opened in Welland, Ontario, to replace an existing factory in Waukesha, Wisconsin. The reason for moving to Canada from the US was a lack of export financing from the U.S. Export-Import Bank.
