= Pakistan Institute of Engineering and Applied Sciences =

Public university in Islamabad, Pakistan

Pakistan Institute of Engineering & Applied Sciences
- پاکستان انسٹی ٹیوٹ آف انجینئرنگ اینڈ اپلائیڈ سائنسز
- Other name: PIEAS
- Former names: Centre for Nuclear Studies (CNS) (1976-1997); Reactor School (1967-1976)
- Type: Public
- Established: 1997
- Founder: Inam-ur-Rehman
- Affiliations: HEC, PEC, NCEAC, PAEC
- Chancellor: President of Pakistan
- Rector: Aneela Usman
- Faculty: 170+ including 150+ PhDs
- Administrative staff: 550+
- Students: 2000+
- Undergraduates: 1400
- Postgraduates: 500+
- Doctoral students: 100+
- Location: Islamabad, Pakistan; 33°39′22″N 73°15′52″E
- Campus: Urban, 312+ acres
- Colours: Dark green, white and sky blue
- Website: www.pieas.edu.pk

The Pakistan Institute of Engineering and Applied Sciences (PIEAS) (Urdu: پاکستان انسٹی ٹیوٹ آف انجینئرنگ اینڈ اپلائیڈ سائنسز) is a public research university located in Islamabad, Pakistan. The university is modelled on international standards with a strong focus on the scientific advancement of the nuclear science-related STEM fields.

Founded in 1967 as Reactor School from the sponsorship of the Pakistan Atomic Energy Commission in response to support and manage the nuclear energy infrastructure in the country, the institute started its educational activities with the affiliation of Quaid-e-Azam University, and became Centre for Nuclear Studies (CNS) in 1976— the center gained its new name and became independent as public university in 1997. In 2000, the PIEAS was granted the status of a doctorate degree awarding institute. PIEAS is based on a 150 acres (0.61 km^{2}; 0.23 sq mi) campus and has around 135 full-time faculty members.

As of 2017, Higher Education Commission rated PIEAS as the 1st leading engineering university in Pakistan. The QS World University Rankings ranked it as 390th worldwide while QS Asia University Rankings ranked it as 3rd in Pakistan, 189th overall in Asia in 2022. It is ranked 47th in QS top 50 under 50.

== History ==
In 1967, the institute was found and established as the Reactor School by I. H. Usmani who put the administrative management of the school under the Pakistan Atomic Energy Commission (PAEC)— the school was originally aimed towards providing technical training to support Pakistan's nuclear energy infrastructure. The first college classes were offered in a lecture auditorium at the Pakistan Institute of Nuclear Science and Technology (PINSTECH), and had only one faculty member Dr. Inam-ur-Rehman from the Mississippi State University to teach courses in engineering. Its training program was very limited in its scope apart from teaching basics in engineering and the institute itself was housed in a 625 sq.ft– the auditorium of the Institute of Nuclear Science and Technology.

The Reactor School received much greater attention from Munir Ahmad Khan who instituted the fellowship program in 1972, inviting the science and engineering graduates to compete for the award of attractive fellowships for the duration of the course. It was Khan who lobbied to the government to secure funding to move the Reactor School from Nilore to Islamabad. In 1976, the Reactor School was renamed as Centre for Nuclear Studies (CNS) as Khan and Rehman were the first to serve on its original faculty and painstakingly instituting the engineering education program by building the criteria for the bachelorette and master's degree programs offered in engineering and physical sciences.

In 1989, the degree program in medicines and the doctoral program in engineering and physical sciences was established in 1990. Due to enhancements in its infrastructure that created the capability for offering programs in many different fields of science, its name was changed to Pakistan Institute of Engineering and Applied Sciences (PIEAS) in 1997— the year when the Institute of Applied Sciences was granted its status as public research university. Today, PIEAS is a multi-faceted, degree-awarding university-level educational institution, with academic and training programmes being conducted at the highest level in a broad spectrum of disciplines. .

...I have learnt that CNS has been renamed as PIEAS and is becoming a University. I am sure that one day, it will emerge as the MIT of Pakistan...

— Munir Ahmed Khan, speaking at the Chagai Medal Award Ceremony at PINSTECH Auditorium, March 20, 1999

== Campus ==
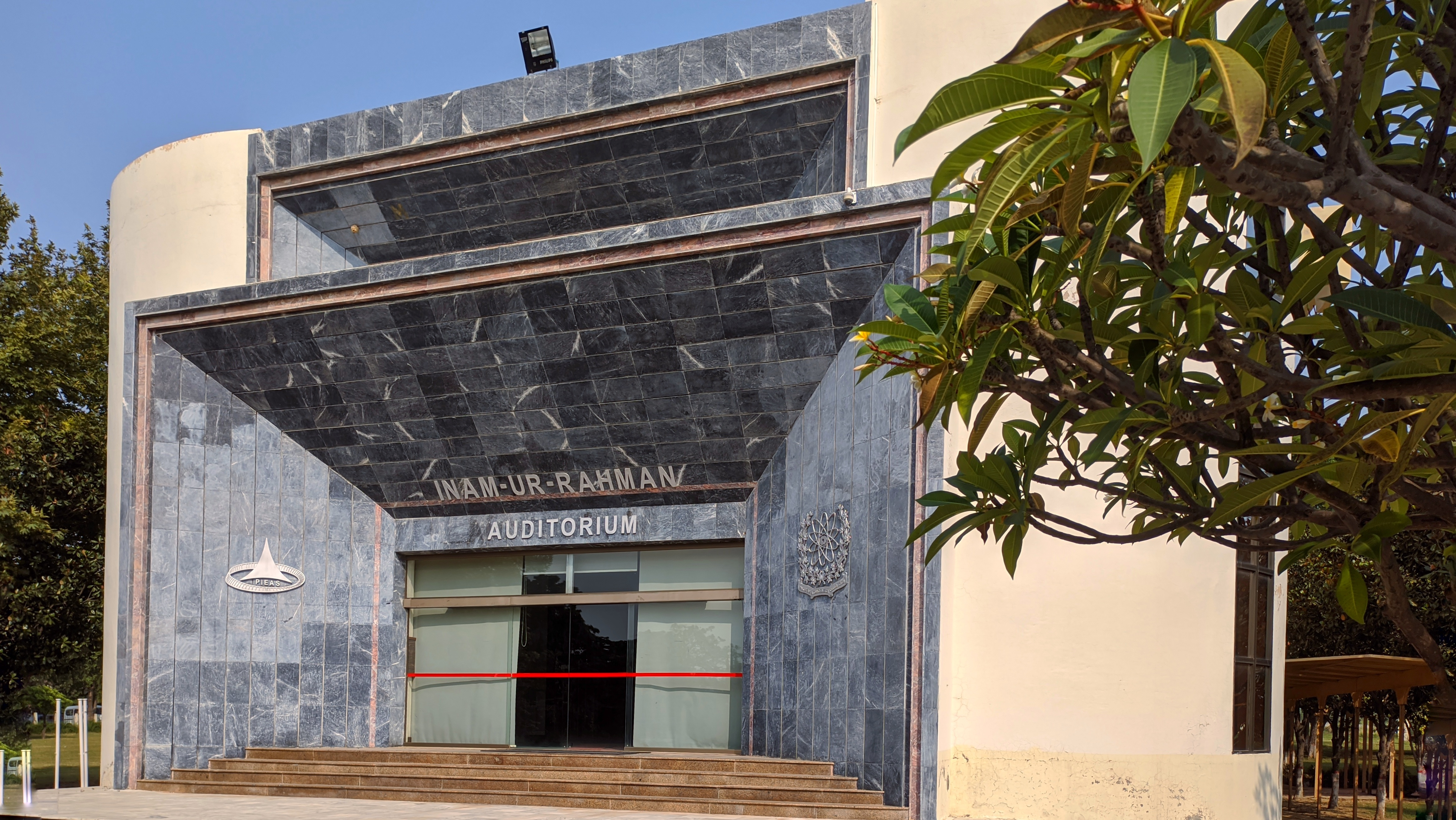
PIEAS Auditorium

The PIEAS campus is sprawled over an area of about 360 acres. The physical structure comprises nine academic blocks, eight workshops, production plants for liquid nitrogen and oxygen, 30 laboratories, lecture halls, a video-conferencing facility, conference rooms, and a 400-seat auditorium.

A state-of-the-art computer center with 200 computers provides computational facilities around the clock, seven days a week. PIEAS is an associate of PERN network and has access to HEC Digital Library that can be accessed from any one of the 1500 nodes of PIEAS Local Area Network. Internet facilities are available even in student hostels. The PIEAS library holds a repository of more than 15000 artifacts and it also subscribes to both technical and academic journals. PIEAS Library has extended hours to facilitate students' access A new library block is under construction.

=== Residential facilities ===
PIEAS provides hostel facilities for both female and male students. Most students stay there. There are eight hostel blocks including a separate female hostel, No profit no loss mess, canteen, fitness centre, rest-house, and indoor and outdoor sports facilities. A post office, bank and shops for commonly required items are available in the vicinity. A mosque is a recent addition and it is large.

== Academics ==
The current major areas of academic and technical activities available at the institute are Computer and Control Systems, Applied Electronics, Applied Mathematics & Numerical Analysis, Analytical Chemistry, Nuclear Engineering, Materials Science & Materials Engineering, Chemical Engineering, Mechanical Engineering, Radiation Physics, Optics & Laser Physics, Polymer Laboratory and Nuclear Medicine.

Although PIEAS offers BS, MS, M Phil and PhD degree programs, the postgraduate degree programs dominate. In addition to the degree programs, PIEAS also offers specialized short courses to engineers, scientists and other professionals for their continuing professional development. The length of these courses vary from 2 to 18 months, and the areas covered have included reactor supervision and operation, health physics, medical physics, laser technology, vacuum technology, computer applications advanced reactor safety and management sciences.

=== Degree programs ===
The disciplines and the degree programs offered by PIEAS have been tabulated below. The regular duration of BS and MS / M Phil degree programs is four and two years, respectively.

Discipline	Degree program		
Discipline	BS	MS / M Phil	Ph.D.
Chemical Engineering	✓	✓	✓
Chemistry		✓	✓
Computer & Information Sciences	✓	✓	✓
Electrical Engineering	✓	✓	✓
Mechanical Engineering	✓	✓	✓
Medical Sciences		✓	✓
Metallurgy & Materials Engineering	✓	✓	✓
Nuclear Engineering		✓	✓
Physics & Applied Mathematics	✓	✓	✓

=== Faculty ===
PIEAS has around 135 full-time faculty members in the diverse fields of physical sciences, engineering and medicine. 95 of them have PhD degrees from highly reputed institutions in the US, Canada, UK, Germany, France, China, Japan, Austria and Australia. Another 25 faculty members were expected to complete their PhD studies during 2013 and 2014. PIEAS faculty members have published more than 650 papers in international journals and have been decorated with 3 Sitara-e-Imtiaz, 2 Tamgha-i-Imatiaz, 3 President's Pride of Performance, 1 President's Medal for Technology, 1 Aizaaz-e-Kamal, 3 Aizaaz-e-Fazeelat, and 9 Best Teacher Awards.

=== Research and industrial liaison ===
PIEAS is a multifaceted educational institution, with academic and training programs conducted at the highest level in a broad spectrum of disciplines. These are complemented by an active R&D program, which now also extends to working on industry-related projects. In this context, several products of industrial use, like a PC-controlled drill machine, a PC-controlled milling machine, and robotic manipulators, have been developed. Specialized systems for educational purposes, such as a PC-controlled multi-variable tank, have also been supplied to various institutions. Currently there are more than 100 doctoral candidates registered in the PhD program in Nuclear Engineering, Systems Engineering, Physics, Nuclear Medicine and Computer Science.

=== Rankings, honors and awards ===
University rankings

Global – Overall
- QS World: 390 (2023)
- QS Under 50: 46 (2021)

Regional – Overall
- QS Asia: 176 (2021)

PIEAS's excellence was recognized on the national level when it was declared to be the best engineering university in Pakistan by the Higher Education Commission (HEC) in its first ever ranking of universities in 2006. PIEAS retained this title in HEC's second ranking, carried out in 2012. The university was ranked as the top engineering institute of Pakistan by the HEC in the "engineering and technology" category, as of 2013. QS World University Rankings ranked the institute top in Pakistan and 106th in Asia in 2014. QS World University Rankings ranked the institute fifth in Pakistan and 146th in Asia in 2016. In 2017, according to PEC rankings, PIEAS tops the list.

PIEAS has active links with reputed universities in developed countries, which have helped with the development of PIEAS's PhD program. During COVID, PIEAS developed the CORVENT ventilator. It was Pakistan's first indigenous developed ventilator.

== Student life ==
=== Societies and clubs ===
The main office bearers of student societies are elected from the student body via SADiv. Nevertheless, links between the members of these societies and the corresponding in charge from faculty used to be maintained for coordination. These groups include PIEAS Performing Arts Society, PIEAS Literary Society, PIEAS Thematic Society, PIEAS Media Club, PIEAS Volunteer Society, Society for Promotion of Entrepreneurship and Leadership name as InnovateX_PIEAS affiliated with ORIC and BIC , PIEAS Debating Society, PIEAS Sportics Society and PIEAS Blood Donors Society. There are also a few sports clubs and student chapters of IEEE.

=== Annual events ===
==== NUKTA ====
Nukta is an annual inter-university event held under the collaboration of both PIEAS PERFORMING ARTS and PDS. It consisted of competitions in Dramatics, Shortfilms and Declamations. Six editions of Nukta had been held with NUKTA'19 being the latest.

=== Publications ===
PIEAS Literary Society has been writing quarterly newsletters by the name of Zeest since the fall of 2013 and yearly magazines by the name Dareecha since 2012. Both these publications are available in a PDF format from the official website of PIEAS, whereas only the annual magazine's hard copy is distributed among the students.

== Notable Former Faculty ==
The university's initial notable faculty included:

- Munir Ahmad Khan (former PAEC Chairman)
- Dr. Inam-ur-Rehman, HI, SI – Scientist Emeritus, pioneer nuclear engineer, and founding director of the institute (formerly CNS).
- Dr. Ansar Pervaiz, HI, SI – Renowned nuclear engineer and former Chairman of the Pakistan Atomic Energy Commission (PAEC).
- Dr. Muhammad Aslam, SI – Nuclear engineer, former Rector of PIEAS, and former Rector of the University of Management Sciences.
- Dr. Nasir Majid Mirza, TI – Professor of Nuclear Engineering, computational reactor physics specialist, and former Rector of PIEAS.
- Dr. Masood ul Hasan, PoP – Former Professor and Head of the Department of Metallurgy and Materials Engineering (DMME).
- Dr. Shahid Qamar, TI – Former Senior Professor of Physics and Director of CMS, recognized for contributions to quantum optics and laser physics.
- Dr. Mazhar Mehmood, PoP – Former Professor of Metallurgy & Materials Engineering and Director of Quality Assurance (QA).
- Dr. Muhammad Aftab Rafiq, TI – Former Professor of Physics, recognized for research in semiconductor nanotechnology and nanomaterials.

== Notable Current Faculty ==
- Dr. Asifullah Khan, PoP – Professor of Computer Science and Director of the Center for Mathematical Sciences (CMS), recognized for contributions to Artificial Intelligence.
- Dr. Aneela Zameer Jaffery, TI – Deputy Chief Scientist, current Dean of Research, and Professor of Computer Sciences and Artificial Intelligence.
- Dr. Naeem ul Haq Tariq, TI – Professor of Metallurgy and Materials Engineering.

== See also ==
- Higher Education Commission (HEC)
- Pakistan Engineering Council (PEC)
- National Computing Education Accreditation Council (NCEAC)
- Pakistan Atomic Energy Commission (PAEC)
