= Pakistan Atomic Energy Commission =

Pakistani government agency

- PAEC
- Official logo of the PAEC

Agency overview
- Formed: March 23, 1956; 70 years ago
- Superseding agencies: Nuclear Regulatory Authority; National Command Authority
- Type: Regulatory
- Jurisdiction: Government of Pakistan
- Headquarters: Islamabad, Pakistan
- Motto: Committed to Serve the Nation
- Employees: 120,000–130,000
- Annual budget: FY 2026-27 federal budget
- Agency executive: Dr. R. Ali Raza Anwar Chairman
- Key document: Pakistan Atomic Energy Commission Ordnance, 1965
- Website: paec.gov.pk/index.aspx

The Pakistan Atomic Energy Commission (PAEC) is an independent federal agency of the Government of Pakistan, tasked and concerned with research and development of nuclear power, nuclear reactor production, energy security, and the energy conservation.

Established in 1956 to address the energy shortage in the country, the agency plays a pivotal role in harnessing the peaceful usage of the nuclear technology by advocating and building the nuclear power infrastructure to uplift the nation into economic prosperity. The PAEC sponsors and promotes the physical sciences research than any other Pakistan's federal agency, which is conducted through its research laboratories and development complexes. Since 1960, the PAEC is also been a major financial sponsor, supporter, and a research partner of the European CERN in Switzerland.

Until 2001, the PAEC was the civilian federal oversight agency that manifested the control of atomic radiation, research and development of the nuclear weapons, and eventually their testings. These functions were eventually taken over by two superseding federal agencies– Nuclear Regulatory Authority (PNRA) and the National Command Authority (NCA)– which allowed the agency to revert to its original civilian mission on peaceful usage of the nuclear technology.

== Overview ==
=== Early history ===
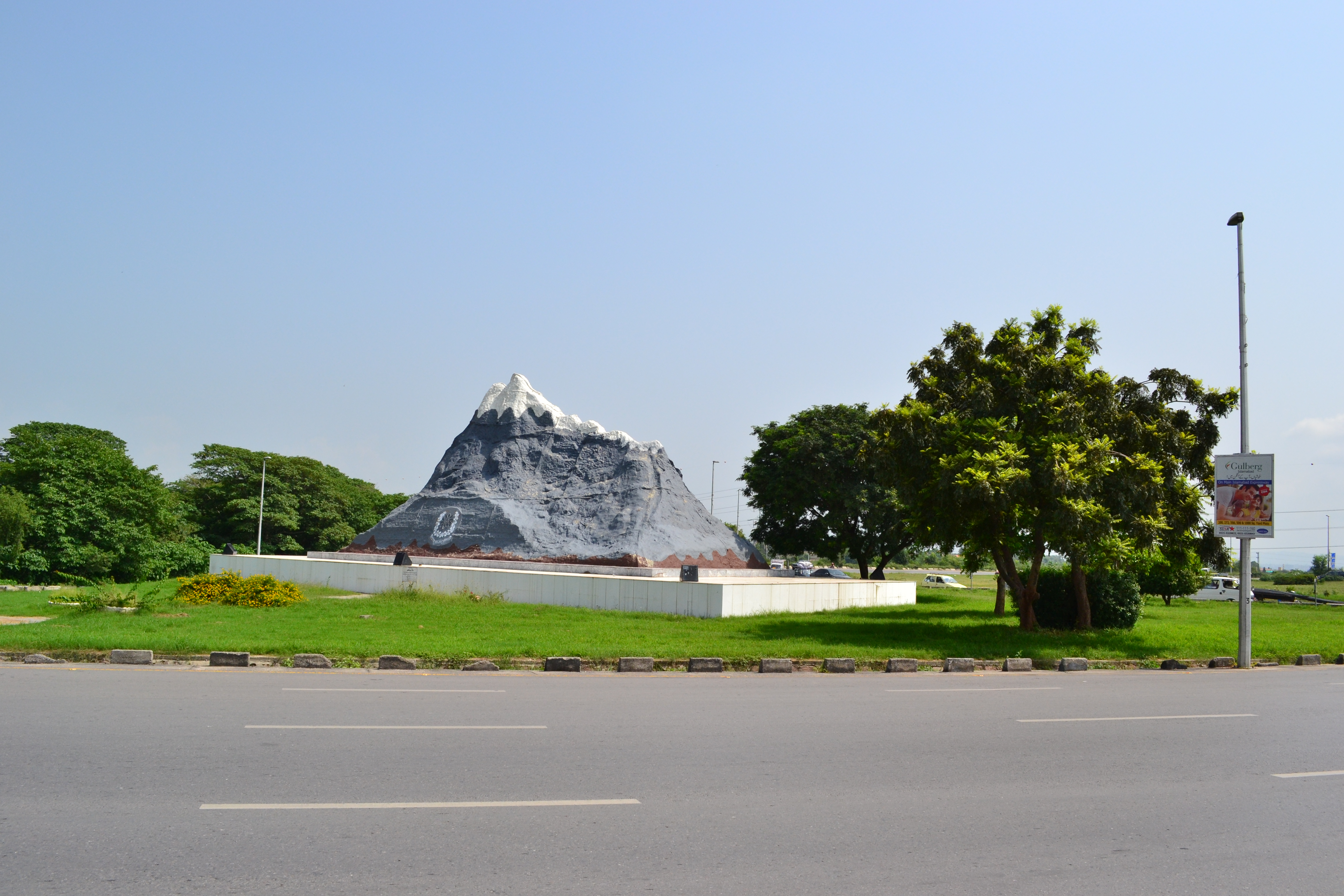
The Chaghi Monument built by the PAEC at its science part in Islamabad to commomerate the memory.

After the announcement of the Atoms for Peace program by the United States in 1953, Prime Minister Huseyn Suhrawardy formed the commission to investigate the venues of nuclear power to ensure the energy security that would contribute to the economic uplift and the prosperity of the nation on 23 March 1956.

Efforts directed towards acquiring the nuclear power plant for producing electricity, food irradiation to improve the quality of nation's agriculture, and medicines to improve the overall health of the nation failed due to lack of manpower, scientific awareness, and the funds from the Planning Commission. In 1960, the Atomic Energy Commission sat up the scholarship program that would address the issue of lack of manpower by sending first the 600 scientists to the universities of the United States, United Kingdom, and Germany as recommended by the written letters by commission's members.

With approved budget of ₨.46.5 million (USD 9.8 million ($99.8 million in 2025) with adjusted inflation) in 1960–65 by the Ayub administration, the design and planning of the commercial nuclear power plant, research reactor, and the fuel bank facility began as well as the establishment of the nation's first national laboratory dedicated for the understanding of the nuclear physics. Construction of the Pakistan Institute of Nuclear Science & Technology in Nilore began in 1963 to dedicated to fill the AEC's mission and partnered with the local fertilizer companies to build the heavy water facility in Multan in 1964.

Facilitated by the International Atomic Energy Agency (IAEA) in 1965, the Pakistan Atomic Energy Commission entered in negotiation with the Canadian General Electric company to supply the smaller 137 megawatts (0.137 GW) (thermal) nuclear power reactor based on the CANDU design basis but with Pakistani engineering modifications affordability and the required energy needs. Between 1969 and 1971, the Pakistan Atomic Energy Commission entered in talks with the United Kingdom to establish the nuclear reprocessing site and partnered with the United Kingdom Atomic Energy Authority (UKAEA) for reactor operations training.

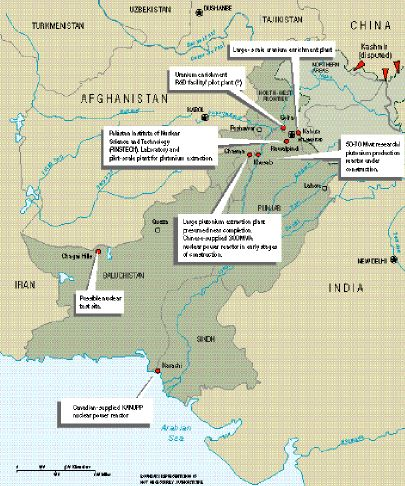
The weapons science research development complexes as shown, CEIP data, 1995..

After the war with India in 1971, the Atomic Energy Commission was tasked and put in charge of researching and developing the nuclear explosive devices to avert and further divert India's threat to Pakistan as a means of national survival in 1972. Under the Bhutto administration, the Atomic Energy Commission's special weapons program under Munir Ahmad Khan oversaw the operation of Pakistan Institute of Nuclear Science & Technology, devoted primarily to understanding of the equation of state of plutonium, the overall weapons development, and partnered with the Pakistan Army Corps of Engineers to handle the engineering aspects of the nuclear weapons. In 1972, the Atomic Energy Commission inaugurated and announced the successful criticality operation of the nation's first nuclear power plant– a distinction which made Pakistan a first nuclear power country in the Islamic world.

In a direct response to India's first nuclear test in 1974, the agency initiated the uranium enrichment program (Codename: Project-706), which was later found to be difficult to pursue without a team of qualified metallurgists and underscored a dedicated laboratory to understand the equation of state of uranium.

In 1975–76, the Atomic Energy Commission also began a program of regular nuclear weapons testing when its geologists selected the Ras Koh Range as a primary weapons-testing venue. During this period, the Atomic Energy Commission supported and promoted much of the fundamental research, the vast majority of its early budget was devoted to nuclear weapons development and production.

In 1980, the Atomic Energy Commission became connected with the Ministry of Defense and had complete oversight on variety of weapons design, diagnostics certification, and testing viability. Furthermore, the agency also had the responsibility of nuclear regulation while controlling the military and civilian sides of nuclear energy, promoting them and at the same time attempting to regulate them. The Atomic Energy Commission through its weapons-testing laboratories had developed the various physics diagnostics to carry out the energy measurements and compute blast yields of their design through supercomputing. On 11 March 1983, the Atomic Energy Commission oversaw the success of the first subcritical nuclear testing (Kirana-I) which continued over the successive years.

In a direct response and to maintain the balance of power in South Asia, the Sharif administration in Pakistan ordered the Atomic Energy Commission to carry out the nation's first nuclear weapons testing at its nuclear test site on 28 May 1998, which was followed by six nuclear test on 30 May 1998.

Over the issue of validating the operational deterrence and effectiveness of the nuclear regulation, the Atomic Energy Commission's mission was reverted to original civilian mission when the control over of nuclear weapons was given to the National Command Authority and the nuclear safety regulations to the Nuclear Regulatory Authority in 2001.

=== Research and education ===
Since its establishment in 1956, the Atomic Energy Commission has provided a conspicuous example of the benefits of atomic age technologies for the advancement of agriculture, engineering, biology, and medicines. Since 1960, the Atomic Energy Commission has promoted, sponsored, and promoted the education on the physical sciences and the engineering in the country. The Atomic Energy Commission established the cancer awareness workshops and nation's first cancer research center at the Jinnah Medical College of the University of Karachi, followed by the establishment of the nuclear medicine institute established at the Mayo Hospital of the King Edward University in Lahore. The Atomic Energy Commission regularly provides the funding and financial support to the practicising physicians and cancer researchers of the Karachi University and the King Edward University.

In 1963, the Atomic Energy Commission established the metallurgy center in Karachi in 1963 to promote the understanding of the material sciences, followed by the Atomic Energy Center in Dhaka.

In 1967, the Atomic Energy Commission established and founded Institute of Engineering and Applied Sciences from its own funding to promote the nuclear reactor physics and engineering education in the country. The Atomic Energy Commission has continued support and funding of university level science education at the University of Karachi and at the Government College University in Lahore where it awards fellowships to the students."

The Atomic Energy Commission is the founder and financial supporter of the following schoolings:

- Nuclear Institute for Food and Agriculture
- Nuclear Institute for Agriculture and Biology
- National Institute for Biotechnology and Genetic Engineering
- National Agricultural Research Centre
- Institute of Nuclear Medicine, Oncology and Radiotherapy
- National Centre for Physics
- National Institute of Lasers and Optronics (NILOP)
- Pakistan Institute of Engineering and Applied Sciences (PIEAS)
- Center for Nuclear Medicine and Radiotherapy (CENAR)
- Nuclear Medicine, Oncology and Radiotherapy Institute (NORI)

About its promotion of scientific education, senior scientist, Ishfaq Ahmad quoted: " PAEC was responsible to send more than 600 scientists to abroad to study science". Promotion of science and awareness in the country has been paramount goals of the agency and has been a major financial sponsor of the Summer College on Physics and the International Centre for Theoretical Physics in Italy since 1974.

As the emphasis shifted towards concerns for national security interests, the Atomic Energy Commission's important projects were also initiated to secure security at all spectrums from the emerging threats from India.

=== Studies on expansion of nuclear power ===
The Pakistan Atomic Energy Commission is a prime contractor for the Government of Pakistan to take responsibility of reactor design analysis, preparation, and their proper operational function of the commercial nuclear power plants.

In 1974–76, the Atomic Energy Commission submitted the ambitious plans to the Planning Commission on an expanding the nuclear power plants by generating the 8,800 megawatts (8.8 GW) by 2030 and 40,000 megawatts (40 GW) by 2040 to address energy security and shortage. This plan is still being aggressively pursued and the agency has engaged in lobbying at the governmental level for the safe usage of nuclear power sources.

Though the nuclear safety and security regulations are enforced through the independent Nuclear Regulatory Authority (PNRA), the Atomic Energy Commission takes the responsibility as a prime contractor to safely operate and run the large commercial nuclear power plants in Karachi and Chashma which have been expanding and under construction as of 2013.

== Partnership with CERN ==
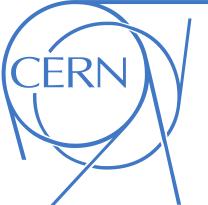
Since 1960, the PAEC has been a regular research partner and a major financial support of high energy physics experiments at the CERN.

The Pakistan Atomic Energy Commission has a long history of participating in funding of the physics experiments and research undertakings with CERN in Switzerland.

Since the 1960, Pakistan Atomic Energy Commission has been financially contributing and regularly participating in CERN's physics projects– in both experiments in advancing the high energy physics or validating the abstracts in the theoretical physics. It was the efforts of Abdus Salam and Ishfaq Ahmad later who connected the Atomic Energy Commission to collaborate with the CERN which when they convinced the CERN to give Pakistan stacks of nuclear emulsions exposed for further study of pions, kaons and antiprotons in the 1960s. Pakistani theoretical physicists later had opportunities to work at CERN and opened doors for the experimental physicists to build and deliver the Solid State Nuclear Track Detectors (SSNTD), also benefited from CERN by exposing the stacks in the beam at the Super Proton Synchrotron (SPS).

In 2005, CERN awarded Atomic Energy Commission with the ATLAS Supplier Award in 2005, in connection with manufacturing and fabrication of various equipment for CERN.

On 27 June 2011, the Atomic Energy Commission and the CERN reached an agreement for extending the technical cooperation with CERN's upcoming programmes. The agreement was signed in order to extend an earlier agreement, which came into operation in 2003 between CERN and Pakistan for the supply of manufactured equipment for the Large Hadron Collider (LHC) at CERN, along with placement of scientists and engineers from Pakistan to assist in the scientific programme at CERN.

Eventually, the efforts and long-term partnership with the CERN made Pakistan an associate member on 22 June 2014— the first Asian country and the second Muslim country after Turkey.

=== PAEC contribution to Compact Muon Solenoid ===
In 1997, the PAEC chairman, Ishfaq Ahmad, reached out to CERN to sign a contract between them after elaborate discussions an in-kind contribution worth one million Swiss francs for the construction of eight magnet supports for the Compact Muon Solenoid (CMS) detector.

For the CMS, the PAEC built magnetic feet and installed 320 Resistive Plate Chambers (RPC), as well as contributing to CMS computing. Several other mechanical components for ATLAS and for the LHC were also built by the PAEC. It was PAEC's efforts that led the Pakistan Institute of Nuclear Science and Technology (PINSTECH) with CERN's direct cooperation in the area of radioprotection.

=== World's largest particle accelerator at CERN ===
The PAEC, partnered with Pakistan's leading universities, sent a large team of scientists and engineers to CERN to participate in the Large Hadron Collider on 10 September 2008. According to the news sources, the team of Pakistani scientists were keenly involved in the development of the Large Hadron Collider— the world's largest and highest-energy particle accelerator.

The data of the experiment was available for the Pakistani scientists who would examine the data and results would be accumulated afterwards by them.

== Awards ==
On 26 June 2021, 4 scientists of the PAEC were awarded the Team Achievement Award and another scientist was awarded the Young Scientist Award for work in plant mutation breeding and related technologies. These awards were bestowed in recognition of Pakistan's advancements in the application of nuclear technology for achieving the U.N. Sustainable Development Goals. The awards were jointly awarded by the International Atomic Energy Agency (IAEA) and the U.N.'s Food and Agriculture Organization.

== Corporate affairs and management ==
The Pakistan Atomic Energy Commission's mission and mandate was promulgated by the presidential ordinance in 1965 but also approved later as a parliamentary act in 1974. The Pakistan Atomic Energy Commission's leadership consists of an appointed chairman assisted by the seven full-time members and three part-time members.

The chairman is appointed by the President of Pakistan on the nomination of the Prime Minister of Pakistan and the chairman's staff included the full-time members who are designated as "Member (Finance)" and "Member (Technical)".

Its part-time members are composed of the senior scientists and the chief scientific adviser to the government.

- Full Time Ex-officios
  - Chairman— Chair of the PAEC.
  - Finance Member— A civil servant from the Ministry of Finance (MoF).
  - Technical members— one from Pakistan Engineering Council (PEC) and one from Pakistan Administrative Service.
  - Disaster Recovery members— one from Pakistan Healthcare Council and one from Pakistan Institute of Medical Sciences.
- Part-Time Ex-officios
  - Senior scientist— A scientist from the Ministry of Science (MoST).
  - Senior Engineer—An engineer appointed by the Government of Pakistan.
  - Chief scientific adviser to the Government of Pakistan.

The PAEC's management are constitutionally bound to meet not less than four times every year for the execution of development projects involving nuclear power research and redevelopment that leads towards the of electric power. The Pakistan Atomic Energy Commission retains its autonomous management structure under the National Command Authority and is a prime contractor of the federal agency. Although the chairman is appointed by the president, the chairman directly reports to the Prime Minister's Secretariat for its policy making and confirmation issues.

=== PAEC chairs ===
Chairmen of the Pakistan Atomic Energy Commission (PAEC)
Order	Individual authority	Term start	Termination	Appointed by
1	Nazir Ahmed	11 March 1956	21 May 1960	Iskander Mirza
2	I. H. Usmani	15 July 1960	10 January 1972	Ayub Khan
3	Munir Ahmad Khan	20 January 1972	19 March 1991	Zulfikar Ali Bhutto
4	Ishfaq Ahmad	7 April 1991	6 April 2001	Ghulam Ishaq Khan
5	Parvez Butt	29 December 2001	5 April 2006	Pervez Musharraf
6	Anwar Ali	1 May 2006	31 March 2009	Pervez Musharraf
7	Ansar Pervaiz	7 April 2009	5 April 2015	Asif Ali Zardari
8	Muhammad Naeem	6 April 2015	5 April 2022	Mamnoon Hussain
9	R. Ali Raza Anwar	6 April 2022	Present	Arif Alvi

=== Spin-off's ===
Since 1990, the PAEC has spun off multiple organization, some being partial subsidiaries or where PAEC had minority interests in past.

- National Command Authority (Pakistan)
- Pakistan Nuclear Regulatory Authority
- National Engineering & Scientific Commission
- National Defence Complex
- Maritime Technologies Complex

== See also ==
- Pakistan and weapons of mass destruction
- Science and technology in Pakistan
- Pakistan Institute of Nuclear Science and Technology (PINSTECH)
- Space and Upper Atmosphere Research Commission (SUPARCO)
