= Anwar (name) =

Anwar, Anwer, Anwaar, Anuar, or Anouar is the English transliteration of two given names and surnames of Arabic origin: the masculine given name ʼAnwar (أنور), meaning "luminous" or the feminine given name ʼAnwār (أنوار), meaning "a collection of lights". In Arabic, Anwar is also a comparative adjective with the meaning of "more enlightened". Both variations may also be encountered as surnames, sometimes also with the accompanying "al" (the definite article "the"), as in Al Anwar. Notable people with the name include:

== Given name ==
=== Anouar ===
- Anouar Ben Abdallah (born 1996), Tunisian handball player
- Anouar Abdel-Malek (1924–2012), French-Egyptian political scientist
- Anouar Ayed (born 1978), Tunisian handball player
- Anouar El Azzouzi (born 2001), Dutch-Moroccan footballer
- Anouar Benmalek (born 1956), Algerian novelist, journalist, mathematician, and poet
- Anouar Brahem (born 1957), Tunisian oud player and composer
- Anouar Diba (born 1983), Dutch-Moroccan footballer
- Anouar Ait El Hadj (born 2002), Belgian footballer
- Anouar Hadouir (born 1982), Dutch-Moroccan footballer
- Anouar Abdul Kader (born 1953), Syrian football coach and player
- Anouar Kali (born 1991), Dutch-Moroccan footballer
- Anouar Marzouki, Tunisian politician
- Anouar El Mhassani (born 2001), Dutch footballer
- Anouar El Moukhantir (born 1997), German footballer
- Anouar Ben Naceur (born 1983), Tunisian swimmer
- Anouar H. Smaine (born 1976), Algerian film director, producer, actor, and screenwriter
- Anouar Zeroual (born 1996), Italian footballer

=== Anuar ===
- Anuar Tan Abdullah, Malaysian politician
- Anuar Zainal Abidin (1932–2008), Malaysian judge
- Anuar Abutalipov (1923–2002), Kazakh war hero
- Anuar Alias (born 1962), Malaysian Navy officer
- Anuarbek Alimzhanov (1930–1993), Kazakh writer, publicist, public figure, and politician
- Anuar Abu Bakar (1971–2019), Malaysian footballer
- Anuar Ceesay (born 2002), Welsh footballer
- Anuar Dyusembaev (born 1953), Kazakh mathematician
- Anuar Guerrero (born 1979), Colombian footballer
- Anuar Loitiptip, Kenyan politician
- Anuar Manan (born 1986), Malaysian cyclist
- Anuar Abdul Manap (born 1976), Malaysian politician
- Anuar Peláez (born 1993), Colombian footballer
- Anuar Sariyev (born 1992), Kazakh Paralympic judoka
- Anuar Tuhami (born 1995), Spanish-Moroccan footballer
- Anuar Abdul Wahab (1945–2009), Malaysian martial artist
- Anuar Zain (born 1970), Malaysian singer and actor

=== Anwaar ===
- Anwaar Ahmad (born 1947), Pakistani Urdu writer
- Anwaar Hussain (born 1973), Pakistani jurist

=== Anwar ===
- Anwar (singer) (born 1949), Indian playback singer
- Anwar Agewan (1936–1991), Indian biographer, folklorist, and editor
- Anwar Ahmad (1926–2019), Indian politician
- Anwar Ahmed (born 1986), Indian first-class cricketer
- Anwar Akbari (born 1990), Afghan footballer
- Anwar Ali, multiple people
- Anwar Mohamed Ali (born 1971), Yemeni athlete
- Anwar Arudin (born 1984), Malaysian cricketer
- Anwar Al-Aug (born 1986), Yemeni footballer
- Anwar Khan Auriakhel, Afghan politician
- Anwar al-Awlaki (1971–2011), Yemeni-American imam and al-Qaeda leader
- Anwarul Azim (politician) (1947–2025), Bangladeshi politician
- Anwar Badakhshani (1932–2024), Afghan-Pakistani scholar, writer, and educator
- Anwar Baig (1924–??), Pakistani field hockey player
- Anwar Bannud (1908–1979), Syrian military officer
- Anwar Bensabouh (born 1999), Dutch-Moroccan footballer
- Anwar Bhinder (died 2019), Pakistani politician
- Anwar Boudjakdji (born 1976), Algerian footballer
- Anwar al-Bunni (born 1959), Syrian human rights lawyer
- Anwar Aziz Chaudhry (1930–2020), Pakistani politician and swimmer
- Anwar Ali Cheema (1935–2016), Pakistani politician
- Anwar Chitayat (born 1927), Iraqi-American manufacturer
- Anwar Choudhury (born 1959), British-Bangladeshi diplomat
- Anwar Chowdhry (1924–2010), Pakistani sports official
- Anwarul Bar Chowdhury (born 1946), Bangladeshi diplomat and politician
- Anwar Hossain Chowdhury, Bangladeshi Army officer
- Anwarul Hossain Khan Chowdhury (died 2023), Bangladeshi politician
- Anwarul Kabir Chowdhury, Bangladeshi politician
- Anwarul Karim Chowdhury (born 1943), Bangladeshi diplomat
- Anwar Congo (1937–2019), Indonesian gangster
- Anwar Dangar (died 2004), Afghan militant
- Anwar Lal Dean, Pakistani politician
- Anwar Ditta (1953–2021), British anti-deportation activist
- Anwar Elahi (1936/37–2016), Pakistani cricketer
- Anwar Elkamony (born 1983), Egyptian tennis player
- Anwar Elyounossi (born 1999), Norwegian footballer
- Anwar Farrukhabadi (1928–2011), Indian Sufi poet
- Anwar al-Fatayri (1946–1989), Lebanese politician and militant
- Anwar Fazal (born 1941), Malaysian environmental activist
- Anwar Ferguson (born 1981), Bahamian basketball player
- Anwar Fituri (born 1964), Libyan engineer and politician
- Anwar Gargash (born 1959), Emirati politician
- Anwar Abdul Ghanee (born 1980), Maldivian footballer
- Anwar El Ghazi (born 1995), Dutch-Moroccan footballer
- Anwar Habib, Pakistani electrical engineer
- Anwar Haddam, Algerian politician
- Anwar Hadi (born 1970), Singaporean playwright and actor
- Anwar Hajher, Afghan-American filmmaker
- Anwar Al-Hamadani (born 1974), Iraqi television presenter
- Anwar Hamed (born 1957), Palestinian novelist and poet
- Anwar Hanbaba (1917–??), Chinese educator and politician
- Anwar ul Haq, multiple people
- Anwar Hared (born 1996), Somali-Canadian ice hockey and bandy player
- Anwar Hossain Helal (born 1964), Bangladeshi politician
- Anwar Hussain Hidayatullah, Pakistani politician and diplomat
- Anwarul Hoque, Indian politician
- Anwar Hossain, multiple people
- Anwar Hossein-Panahi, Iranian teacher and political activist
- Anwar Hossain Howlader, Bangladeshi politician
- Anwarul Huq (1918–1981), Bangladeshi sculptor
- Anwar Husnoo (born 1951), Mauritian politician
- Anwar Hussain, multiple people
- Anwar Hussein (photographer) (1938–2024), Tanzanian-British photojournalist and author
- Anwar Ali Hyder, Pakistani military officer
- Anwar Ibrahim (born 1947), Malaysian politician
- Anwar Ibrahim (footballer) (born 1999), Malaysian footballer
- Anwar Iqbal (1949–2021), Pakistani television actor and director
- Anwarul Iqbal (1949/50–2015), Bangladeshi police officer
- Anwarul Islam (Patuakhali politician), Bangladeshi physician and politician
- Anwar Jalalpuri (1947–2018), Indian poet
- Anwar Jamal (born 1961), Indian documentary filmmaker
- Anwar Zaheer Jamali (born 1951), Pakistani jurist
- Anwar Jassam (1947–2024), Iraqi football manager
- Anwar Jibawi (born 1991), American internet personality
- Anwar Kandafil (born 1973), Moroccan wrestler
- Anwar Shah Kashmiri (1875–1933), Indian Islamic scholar
- Anwar M. El-Khalil (born 1938), Lebanese politician
- Anwar Khan (cricketer) (born 1955), Pakistani cricketer
- Anwarul Abedin Khan, Bangladeshi politician
- Anwar Ahmed Khan (1933–2014), Pakistani field hockey player
- Anwarul Ashraf Khan (born 1956), Bangladeshi politician
- Anwar Hayat Khan, Pakistani politician
- Anwar Hossain Khan (born 1961), Bangladeshi politician and businessman
- Anwar Kamal Khan (1946–2012), Pakistani politician
- Anwar Saifullah Khan (born 1945), Pakistani politician and industrialist
- Anwar Zeb Khan, Pakistani politician
- Anwar Khatib (1917–1993), Palestinian politician
- Anwar al-Khatib (Lebanon) (1910–1970), Lebanese lawyer and politician
- Anwar Jan Khetran, Pakistani politician
- Anwar Khokhar (1942–2024), Pakistani philanthropist and barber
- Anwar Jamal Kidwai (1917–1996), Indian civil servant and educator
- Anwar Hussain Laskar (1964–2022), Indian politician and lawmaker
- Anwar Abdul Malik (1898–1998), Malaysian politician
- Anwar Hossain Manju (born 1944), Bangladeshi politician and journalist
- Anwar Maqsood (born 1939), Pakistani scriptwriter, television presenter, satirist, humorist, painter, and actor
- Anwar Masood (born 1935), Pakistani poet
- Anwar Mediero (born 2002), Ethiopian footballer
- Anwar Memet-Ali (born 1997), Chinese footballer
- Anwar Mesbah (1913–1998), Egyptian weightlifter
- Anwar Miandad (born 1960), Pakistani first-class cricketer
- Anwar Mohamed (athlete) (born 1976), Yemeni middle-distance runner
- Anwar Mohamed (taekwondo) (born 1965), Bahraini taekwondo practitioner
- Anwarul Momen (born 1965), Bangladeshi Army officer
- Anwar Hossain Monir (born 1981), Bangladeshi cricketer
- Anwar Musaddad (1910–2000), Indonesian Islamic scholar and academic
- Anwar Nasim (1935–2024), Pakistani molecular biologist and geneticist
- Anwar Ali Noon (1924–2014), Pakistani politician
- Anwar Nuseibeh (1913–1986), Jordanian politician
- Anwar Oshana (born 1972), Assyrian-American boxer
- Anwar Pasha (1928–1971), Bangladeshi novelist
- Anwar Kamal Pasha (1925–1987), Pakistani film director and producer
- Anwar Pervez (born 1935), British-Pakistani businessman
- Anwar Pervez (musician) (1944–2006), Bangladeshi music composer and music director
- Anwar Phillips (born 1982), American football player
- Anwar Pirzada (1945–2007), Pakistani journalist, columnist, and writer
- Anwarul Quader, Bangladeshi politician
- Anwar Rahman (born 1996), Malaysian cricketer
- Anwar Rasheed (born 1976), Indian film director and producer
- Anwar Raslan (born 1963), Syrian Army officer
- Anwar Hasan Rizvi, Indian Army officer
- Anwar Robinson (born 1979), American singer and songwriter
- Anwar Sabbah (1933–2024), Lebanese politician
- Anwar Sadat (1918–1981), Egyptian politician
- Anwar Sadath (born 1975), Indian politician
- Anwar Sagar (1949–2020), Indian poet and lyricist
- Anwar Salama (born 1947), Egyptian football manager and player
- Anwar Adnan Saleh (born 1948), Indonesian politician
- Anwar Seyidov (1949–2025), Azerbaijani lawyer
- Anwar Shahadat, Bangladeshi-American writer, filmmaker, and journalist
- Anwar Ul Alam Shaheed (1947–2020), Bangladeshi Army officer, politician, and diplomat
- Anwar Shaikh (economist) (1945–2026), Pakistani-American economist
- Anwar Shaikh (writer) (1928–2006), Pakistani-British author
- Anwar Shah Shopiani (1849–1939), Indian Islamic preacher, scholar, and poet
- Anwar Shakunda (born 1999), Somali footballer
- Anwar Shamim (1931–2013), Pakistani Air Force officer
- Anwar Shaul (1904–1984), Iraqi-Israeli journalist, publisher, author, translator, and poet
- Anwar Shemza (1928–1985), British-Pakistani artist and writer
- Anwar Shirazi (1768–1801), Iranian prince and poet
- Anwar Siraj (born 1978), Ethiopian footballer
- Anwar Solangi (1944–2008), Pakistani television and radio performer
- Anwar Soussa (born 1972), Greek businessman and corporate executive
- Anwar Stewart (born 1976), American football coach and player
- Anwar Superstar, American hip hop artist
- Anwarul Kabir Talukdar (1944–2020), Bangladeshi politician
- Anwar Tawfik (1914–??), Egyptian fencer
- Anwar Tjokroaminoto (1909–1975), Indonesian journalist and politician
- Anwar Yusuf Turani (born 1962), Uyghur politician dissident
- Anwar Pasha Turki (1926–2004), Pakistani boxer
- Anwar Udjang (1945–2014), Indonesian footballer
- Anwar Usman (born 1956), Indonesian jurist
- Anwar Wagdi (1904–1955), Egyptian actor and director
- Anwar Yassin, Lebanese militant and prisoner
- Anwar Zahid (1938–2008), Bangladeshi politician, journalist, and writer
- Anwar Zaman, Bangladeshi politician
- Anwar al-Zoubi (born 1975), Syrian politician

=== Anwer ===
- Anwer Sultan (born 1962), Indian sport shooter
- Anwer Zahidi (born 1946), Pakistani writer

== Surname ==
=== Anwar ===
- Aamer Anwar (born 1967), Scottish lawyer
- Anan Anwar (born 1986), Thai singer
- Chairil Anwar (1922–1949), Indonesian poet
- Desi Anwar (born 1962), Indonesian reporter
- Faraz Anwar (born 1976), Pakistani guitarist
- Gabrielle Anwar (born 1970), English actress
- Gazi Mazharul Anwar (1943–2022), Bangladeshi film director
- Joko Anwar (born 1976), Indonesian film critic and writer
- Joni Anwar (born 1981), Thai singer
- Rosihan Anwar (1922–2011), Indonesian journalist
- Saeed Anwar (born 1968), Pakistani cricketer
- Shahat Muhammad Anwar (1950–2008), Egyptian Quran reciter
- Tariq Anwar (film editor) (born 1945), Indian-British-American film editor
- Tariq Anwar (politician) (born 1951), Indian politician

=== Anwer ===
- Aiman Anwer (born 1991), Pakistani cricketer
- Khalid Anwer (1938–2025), Pakistani jurist
- M. Sawkat Anwer, American bioscientist

== Fictional characters with the given name ==
- Anwar Kharral, character in the British drama series Skins
- Anwar Ibrahim, character in the science-fiction novel series The Familiar by Mark Z. Danielewski
- Anwar, a cat marionette in ITV Meridian children's TV show The Ark
- Suvi Anwar, a character in the science-fiction video game Mass Effect: Andromeda
- Anwar, character in the British comedy-drama series Sex Education

== See also ==
- Ordre du Nichan El-Anouar, a colonial order of merit of the Tajurah sultanate in French Somaliland
- Anvar
- Enver
