= Anwar Hossain =

Anwar Hossain may refer to:

== People ==
- Anwar Hossain (actor) (1931–2013), Bangladeshi actor
- Anwar Hossain (cricketer) (born 1983), Bangladeshi cricketer
- Anwar Hossain (footballer, born 1935) (1935–1997), Bangladeshi football player and coach
- Anwar Hossain (footballer, born 1979) (born 1979), Bangladeshi footballer
- Anwar Hossain (industrialist) (1938–2021), Bangladeshi industrialist and politician
- Anwar Hossain (microbiologist) (born 1958), Bangladeshi biologist
- Anwar Hossain (model) (born 1993), Bangladeshi actor and model
- Anwar Hossain (photographer) (1948–2018), Bangladeshi photographer, cinematographer, and architect
- Anwar Hossain (physician) (born 1955), Bangladesh politician

== See also ==
- Anwar Hussain (disambiguation)
