= Zeroual =

Zeroual or Zéroual (Arabic: زروال) is an Arabic surname that mainly occurs in Algeria and Morocco. Notable people with the surname include:

- Abdellatif Zeroual (1951–1974), Moroccan politician and philosopher teacher
- Anouar Zeroual (born 1996), Italian footballer of Moroccan descent
- Bouchaib Zeroual (1917–?), Moroccan sport shooter
- Fieroes Zeroual (born 1972), Dutch businesswoman and former politician of Moroccan descent
- Karim Zeroual (born 1993), British television presenter and actor of Moroccan descent
- Larbi Zéroual (born 1971), Moroccan long-distance runner
- Liamine Zéroual (1941–2026), Algerian general, politician and President of Algeria
- Soria Zeroual (born 1970), Algerian actress
