= Panahi =

Panahi is an Iranian surname and may refer to:

- Jafar Panahi (born 1960), Iranian film director, screenwriter, and film editor
- Hossein Panahi (1956–2004), Iranian actor and poet
- Rita Panahi (born 1976), Iranian Australian opinion columnist
- Anwar Hossein Panahi, Iranian Kurdish teacher and political activist
