= Anwar Elkamony =

- Country (sports): Egypt
- Residence: Cairo, Egypt
- Born: 1 May 1983 (age 42) Egypt
- Plays: Right-handed

Singles
- Career record: (play in ATP Challenger Tour, Barcelona challenger 2006 (Spain)
- Career titles: 0 Challengers, 0 Futures
- Highest ranking: No. 1474 (2007.10.08)

Anwar Elkamony (born May 1983) is a former Egyptian professional tennis player. He achieved his career-high ATP singles rankings of 1474 in October 2007. Elkamony participated in several international tournaments from the age of 21. In his second international tournament in Macedonia in 2007, he was diagnosed with bone marrow suppression while playing a match. He was sidelined for more than seven years, during which he underwent successful treatment, including a bone marrow transplant. He returned to play again at the age of 34, participating in several Futures tournaments. He became the first player to return to the ITF rankings after such treatment, reaching a ranking of 3024.

== Other activities ==
Elkamony has taken part in numerous global humanitarian events as the founder of "The Hope Giver Campaign." This initiative focuses on supporting cancer patients, seniors, orphans, and individuals facing mental health challenges. The campaign is held annually with international participation, and its activities have now reached 33 countries worldwide. Elkamony has also been an official speaker at various global forums, including TEDx and WikiStage, and many other international events. He's been honored by numerous international organizations and is considered a representative for several Egyptian humanitarian and medical institutions.

- Filmography: In 2019, a documentary film titled "7th Century Before Birth" was released, telling Anwar's story. The film participated in international film festivals, was screened in Egyptian cinemas, and was shown to cancer patients both inside and outside Egypt. All profits from ticket sales went to charity.
- Book: Anwar Elkamony penned his autobiography, titled "Match at the stadium of death" which Al-Karma Publishing House released in 2021. The book was also selected as one of the best biographical books for prominent Arab figures in 2021.
