= Ramin Hossein-Panahi =

Iranian activist

- Born: 1995 Dehgolan
- Died: 8 September 2018 (aged 23); Gohardasht, Iran
- Relatives: Anwar Hossein Panahi (brother)
- Allegiance: Komala
- Conviction: Waging war against God
- Penalty: Death penalty

Ramin Hossein-Panahi (Persian: رامین حسین‌پناهی ,1995 – 8 September 2018) was an Iranian Kurdish man who was sentenced to death by the Iranian government for taking up arms against Iranian security forces in what Amnesty International alleged a "grossly unfair trial" marred by "serious torture allegations". He was executed on September 8, 2018.

Ramin Hossein Panahi, who had twice been arrested in the mid-2000s, was accused of carrying out acts of sabotage in Iran in 2014 on behalf of the Komala Party of Iranian Kurdistan, an armed Kurdish opposition group which is blacklisted as a terrorist group by Tehran. In mid-June 2017, according to Iranian security, he was tasked with infiltrating Iran in order to carry out a terrorist attack during International Quds Day rallies in the same month. Security sources said he was arrested on 23 June 2017, after being injured in armed clashes with Iranian security operatives. Three of his accomplices were killed in the process.

== International call ==
Panahi's case was a "breathtaking miscarriage of justice from start to finish" according to Amnesty's Philip Luther. Panahi was "denied access to both his lawyer and his family, as well as to any details of the evidence against him" according to Amnesty International. Panahi had been in danger of execution by the Iranian government since 2017 according to Kurdish news agencies like Kurdistan 24. Panahi's brother told VOA Persian that his brother had been transferred to death row in a prison in the city of Sanandaj in June 2018.

In June 2018, the Office of the High Commissioner for Human Rights of the United Nations issued a call to annul the death sentence of Panahi, which had previously been set for 3 May. OHCHR stated that "a request for a judicial review was rejected by the Iranian Supreme Court in late May, and the sentence against him was then referred to the office responsible for carrying it out." The BBC reported that his execution had been prevented by a 'Twitter outcry', and that the Iranian authorities had "bowed to an online campaign to save him."

On September 7, UN rights experts called on Iran to halt the imminent executions of Ramin Hossein Panahi, Zanyar and Loghman Moradi. UN human rights experts claimed that they did not receive a fair trial and were tortured during pre-trial detention.

UN High Commissioner for Human Rights Michelle Bachelet stated in the 39th session of the Human Rights Council: "I deeply deplore the executions last week of three Iranian Kurdish prisoners, despite the serious concerns raised by Special Procedures mandate holders that they were not afforded fair trials, and were subjected to torture. Recent arrests and ill-treatment of a number of human rights defenders and lawyers are deplorable. All those detained for peacefully exercising rights to freedom of expression and association should be released."

A pair of cousins, Zaniar Moradi and Loghman Moradi, were executed along with Panahi on 8 September 2018. The three executions prompted a statement from Philip Luther of Amnesty International.

== See also ==
- Loghman Moradi
- Zaniar Moradi
