= Loghman Moradi =

Kurd political prisoner executed in Iran (1983–2018)

- Born: 1983
- Died: 8 September 2018 (aged 35); Gohardasht Prison, Iran
- Conviction: Waging war against God
- Penalty: Death penalty

Loghman Moradi (Persian: لقمان مرادی, 1983 – September 8, 2018) was a Kurd. He was arrested in 2009 along with his cousin Zaniar Moradi. They were both hanged on September 8, 2018 on charges of killing the son of Marivan's imam.

After they were sentenced to death, they announced that they were forced under torture to confess to the killing and had not played a part in the assassination.

== Incarceration ==
Moradi was arrested by security forces in the town of Marivan in Kurdistan, Iran on August 2, 2009, along with his cousin Zaniar. He has been detained in the Sanandaj Intelligence Agency for nine months where he was “under severe physical and psychological torture.” Family visits were banned from 2009 until 2013.

== International reaction ==
Philip Luther, Amnesty International’s research and advocacy director for the middle east and North Africa condemned the execution of Loghman Moradi and the other two prisoners and said: "We are horrified by the news that the Iranian authorities have executed these men, despite widespread condemnation of their death sentences and call from UN human rights experts and other bodies to halt their executions".

UN High Commissioner for Human Rights Michelle Bachelet said in the opening statement to the 39th Session of the Human Rights Council on September 10: "... they were not afforded fair trials and were subjected to torture. Recent arrests and ill-treatment of a number of human rights defenders and lawyers are deplorable. All those detained for peacefully exercising rights to freedom of expression and association should be released."

== See also ==
- Zaniar Moradi
- Ramin Hossein-Panahi
