= Jashore University of Science and Technology =

University in Bangladesh

Coordinates: 23.2333°N 89.1256°E

- যশোর বিজ্ঞান ও প্রযুক্তি বিশ্ববিদ্যালয়
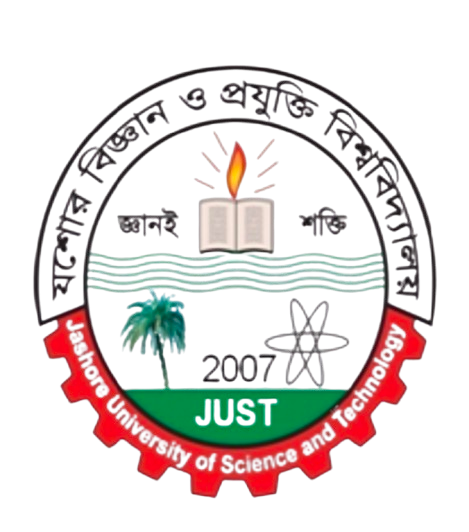
- Former names: Jessore University of Science and Technology (2007–2018)
- Motto: জ্ঞানই শক্তি (Knowledge is power)
- Type: Public research university
- Established: 25 January 2007; 19 years ago
- Accreditation: Institution of Textile Engineers and Technologists
- Affiliations: UGC; PCB
- Chancellor: President Mirza Fakhrul Islam Alamgir
- Vice-Chancellor: Dr. Yearul Kabir
- Faculty: 313
- Administrative staff: 458
- Students: 8,286
- Undergraduates: 6800
- Postgraduates: 1200
- Doctoral students: 86
- Other students: 200
- Location: Sadhinata Sarak, Churamonkati, Jessore, 7408, Bangladesh
- Campus: 45 acres (0.18 km^{2}), Including Jhenaidah Campus, Suburban
- Language: English, Bengali
- Colors: Red and Green
- Mascot: Date tree 🌴
- Website: just.edu.bd
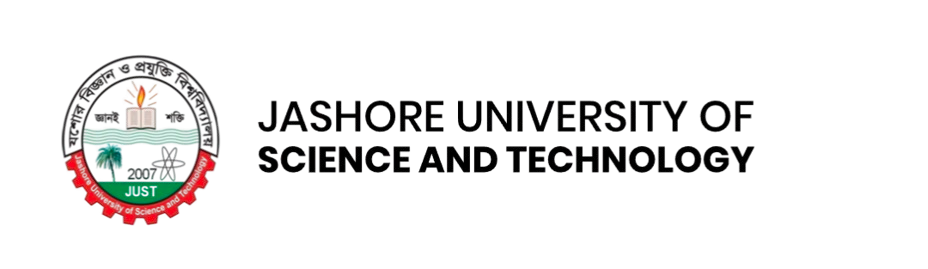

University rankings

Global – Overall
- THE World: 1001-1200 (2026)

Global – Life sciences and medicine
- THE Life Sciences: 601-800 (2026)

Global – Science and engineering
- THE Engineering: 601-800 (2026)
- THE Physical Sciences: 601-800 (2026)

Regional – Overall
- QS Asia: 687 (2026)

Jashore University of Science and Technology (Bengali: যশোর বিজ্ঞান ও প্রযুক্তি বিশ্ববিদ্যালয়), commonly known and abbreviated as JUST (Bengali: যবিপ্রবি), is a government-financed public university in Jashore, Bangladesh.

It is the fourth public university in Khulna Division and the first public university in Jessore. It was established in 2007 and started four-year undergraduate courses from the 2009–2010 session. It was previously known as Jessore Science and Technology University.

== History ==
Jashore University of Science and Technology (JUST) opened in 2008, during the 2008-2009 session. The first batch of JUST started on 10 June 2009. The first four departments were Computer Science & Engineering (CSE), Environmental Science & Technology (EST), Microbiology (MB), and Fisheries and Marine Bioscience (FMB).

In 2009, JUST added Nutrition & Food Technology (NFT), Industrial & Production Engineering (IPE), Chemical Engineering (ChE), Petroleum & Mining Engineering (PME), and Genetic Engineering & Biotechnology (GEBT). In 2010, the Pharmacy department was created. In 2012 Electrical and Electronic Engineering (EEE) and Physical Education and Sports Science (PESS) were added.

Further in 2013, four new departments were added: Physics, Chemistry, Mathematics & Statistics, and English. Accounting and Information Systems and Agro Product Processing Technology were introduced in the academic year 2015–16. In the academic year 2016–2017, the Biomedical Engineering (BME) program began.

Departments of Finance & Banking, Management and Textile Engineering were established in the 2017–18 academic year and of Marketing, Physiotherapy & Rehabilitation in the 2018–19 academic year.

Jhenaidah Government Veterinary College has been included as a faculty of JUST as Faculty of Veterinary Medicine at the 88th meeting of the JUST Board of Regents on March 7, 2023.

== Academics ==
=== Academic calendar ===
The academic year and session is generally divided into two semesters. One semester is composed of 18 1/2 weeks and each week consists of 5 working days. The session usually starts after completion of the second semester. A full-time undergraduate course consists of four sessions or eight semesters. A regular examination is held at the end of each semester besides class tests for continuous assessment of progress.

=== Academic Building ===
==== Kabi Nazrul Academic Building ====
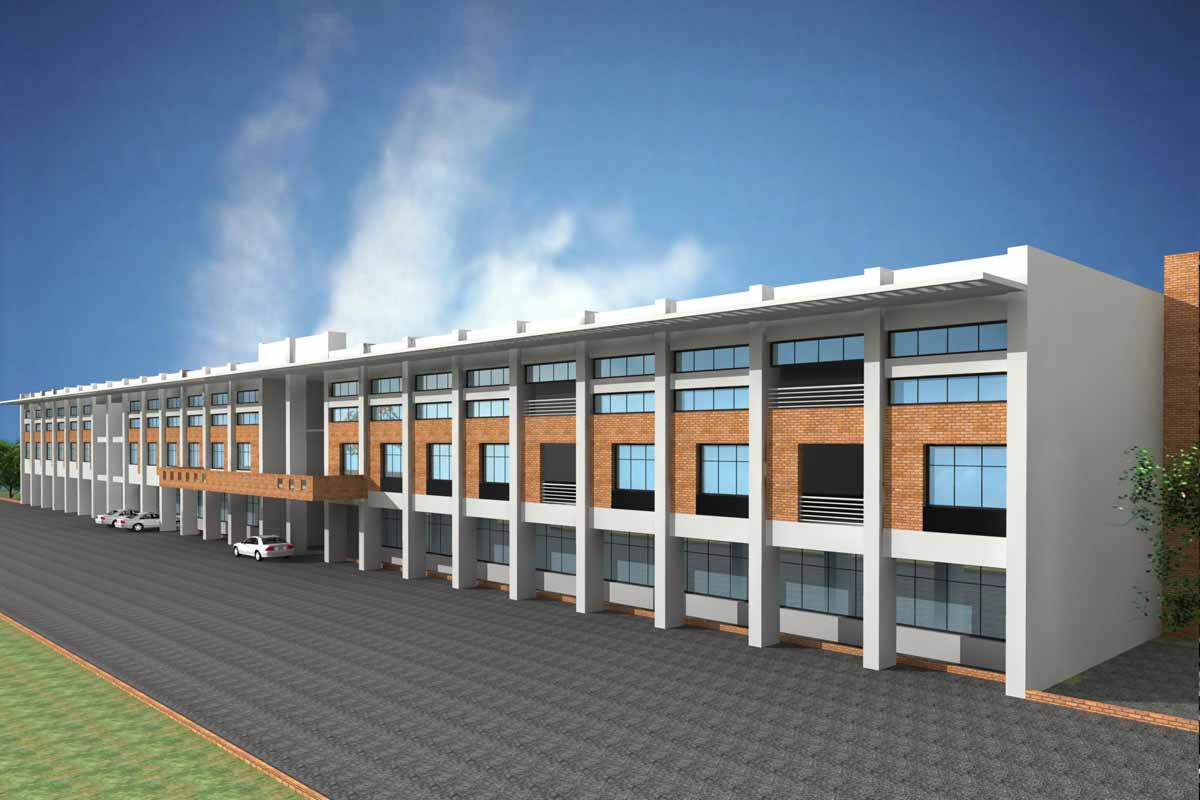
Kabi Nazrul Academic Building

Named after national poet Bangladesh. First academic building of JUST. It's been upgraded and enlarged after establishment. It accommodates three faculties which hold thirteen departments. It has several advance research lab such as Gnome Center, BioSol Lab, Animal Lab, Bioinformation Lab etc. to support the research of Biological Science departments

==== Sir Jagadish Chandra Bose Academic Building ====
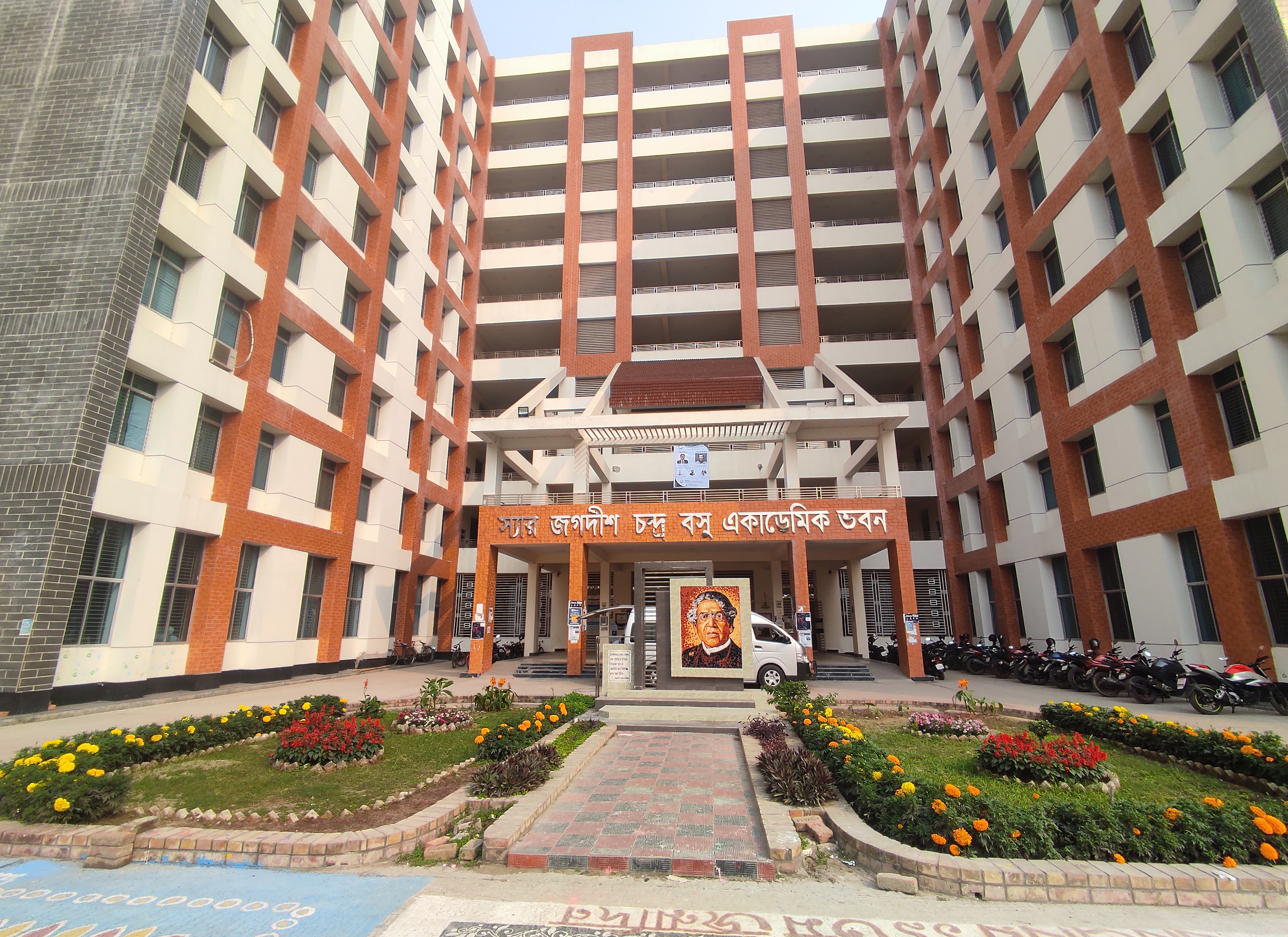
Sir Jagadish Chandra Bose Academic Building

Named after the renowned scientist, this building accommodates two faculties and it's eleven departments. It provides essential facilities to support engineering education and research.

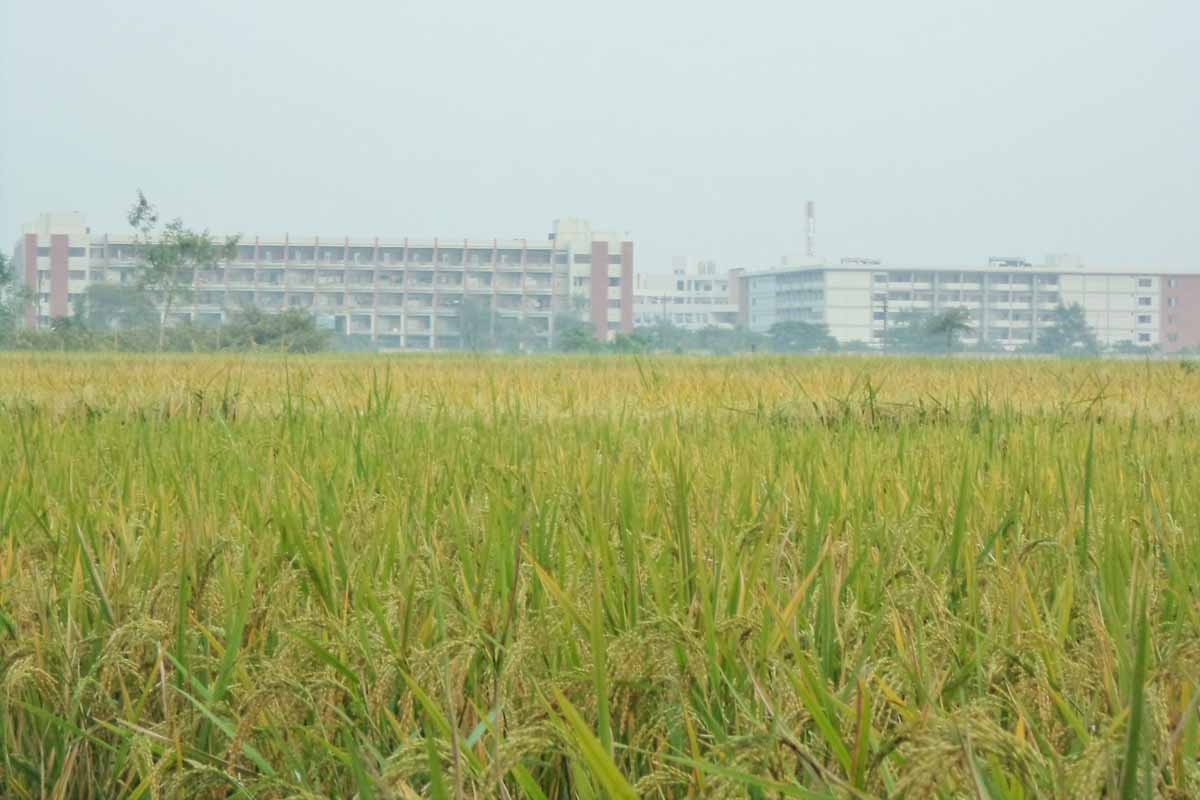
JUST and surrounding area

=== Faculties and departments ===
The university's 29 departments are organised into 8 faculties.

Faculty	Department	Seat
Faculty of Engineering and Technology	Computer Science and Engineering	50
Faculty of Engineering and Technology	Electrical and Electronic Engineering	35
Faculty of Engineering and Technology	Chemical Engineering	35
Faculty of Engineering and Technology	Biomedical Engineering	20
Faculty of Engineering and Technology	Textile Engineering	20
Faculty of Engineering and Technology	Petroleum and Mining Engineering	35
Faculty of Engineering and Technology	Industrial and Production Engineering	40
Faculty of Applied Science and Technology	Environmental Science and Technology	45
Faculty of Applied Science and Technology	Nutrition and Food Technology	40
Faculty of Applied Science and Technology	Agro Product Processing Technology	40
Faculty of Applied Science and Technology	Climate and Disaster Management	25
Faculty of Biological Science and Technology	Microbiology	40
Faculty of Biological Science and Technology	Fisheries & Marine Bioscience	40
Faculty of Biological Science and Technology	Genetic Engineering & Biotechnology	60
Faculty of Biological Science and Technology	Pharmacy	40
Faculty of Biological Science and Technology	Biochemistry and Molecular Biology	20
Faculty of Arts and Social Science	English	40
Faculty of Health Science	Physiotherapy and Rehabilitation	20
Faculty of Health Science	Nursing & Health Science	20
Faculty of Health Science	Physical Education & Sports Science	25
Faculty of Science	Physics	40
Faculty of Science	Chemistry	40
Faculty of Science	Mathematics	40
Faculty of Science	Applied Statistics and Data Science	20
Faculty of Business Studies	Accounting and Information Systems	50
Faculty of Business Studies	Finance and Banking	40
Faculty of Business Studies	Management	40
Faculty of Business Studies	Marketing	40
Faculty of Veterinary Medicine and Animal Sciences	Veterinary Science and Animal Husbandry	60

A total 42 additional seats are reserved for the students under the categories of son/daughter of freedom fighter (30 seats), indigenous (6 seats) and disabled (6 seats). For these seats, a student needs to provide proof by using their related certificate to authority. Once the certificate is received in the mentioned period, after verification, the student will be considered for the reserved seats.

=== Undergraduate and postgraduate programs ===
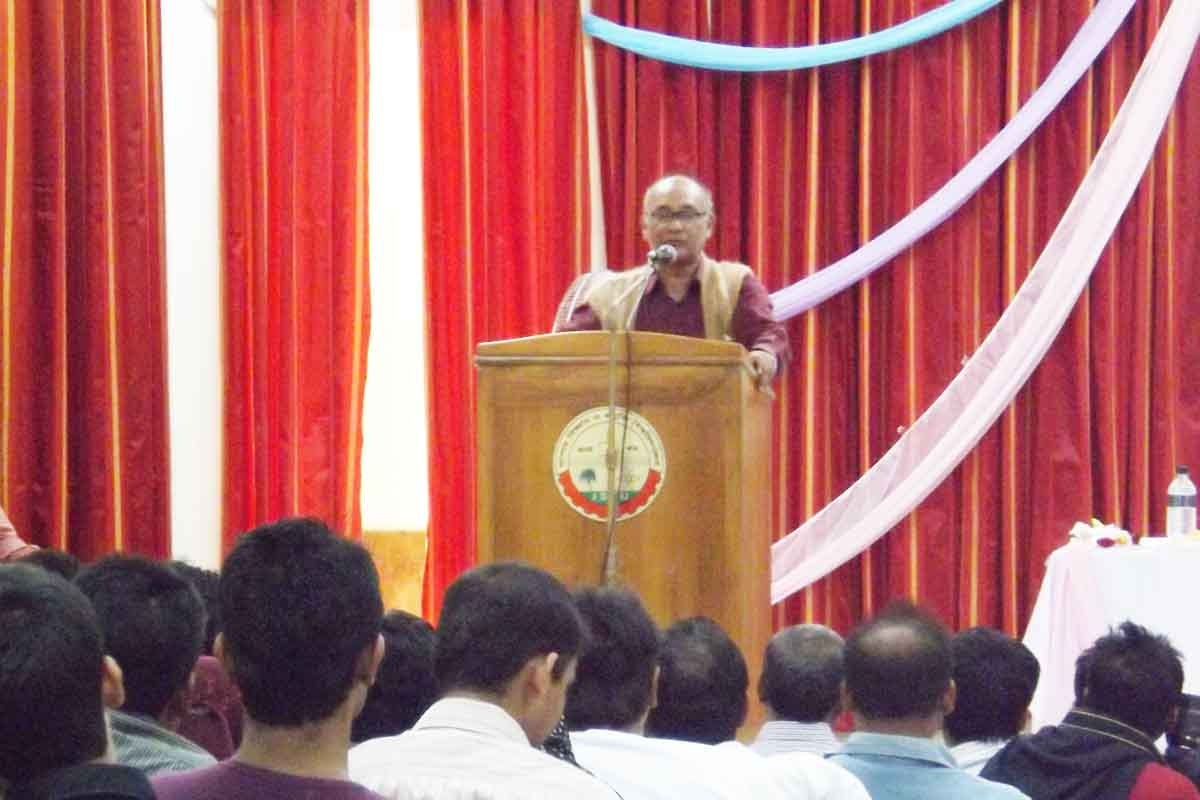
JUST's VC Abdus Sattar delivers a lecture at JUST Auditorium/Gallery

- B.Sc.Engg. / M.Sc.Engg. / M.Engg. / M.Phil. / Ph.D. in electrical & electronic engineering (EEE)
- B.Sc.Engg. / M.Sc.Engg. / M.Engg. / M.Phil. / Ph.D. in computer science & engineering (CSE)
- B.Sc.Engg. / M.Sc.Engg. / M.Engg. / M.Phil. / Ph.D. in industrial & production engineering (IPE)
- B.Sc.Engg. / M.Sc. Engg. / M.Engg. / M.Phil. / Ph.D. in chemical engineering (Ch.E)
- B.Sc.Engg. / M.Sc. Engg. / M.Engg. / M.Phil. / Ph.D. in biomedical engineering (BME)
- B.Sc.Engg. / M.Sc. Engg. / M.Engg. / M.Phil. / Ph.D. in petroleum and mining engineering (PME)
- BS / MS / M.Phil. / Ph.D. in agro product processing technology (APPT)
- BS / MS / M.Phil. / Ph.D. in environmental science & technology (EST)
- BS / MS / M.Phil. / Ph.D. in nutrition & food technology (NFT)
- BS / MS / M.Phil. / Ph.D. in microbiology (MB)
- BS / MS / M.Phil. / Ph.D. in fisheries & marine bioscience (FMB)
- BS / MS / M.Phil. / Ph.D. in genetic engineering and biotechnology (GEBT)
- BS / MS / M.Phil. / Ph.D. in physics (PHY)
- BS / MS / M.Phil. / Ph.D. in mathematics (Math)
- BS / MS / M.Phil. / Ph.D. in chemistry (Chem)
- Bachelor of Pharmacy (B.Pharm.) / Master of Pharmacy (M.Pharm.) / M.Phil. / Ph.D. in pharmacy (Pharm)
- BA / MA / M.Phil. / Ph.D. in English (Eng)
- BBA / MBA / M.Phil. / Ph.D. in accounting and information systems (AIS), management (MGT), marketing (MKT), finance and banking (FB)

== Facilities ==
=== Residence halls ===
==== Shaheed Moshiur Rahman Hall ====
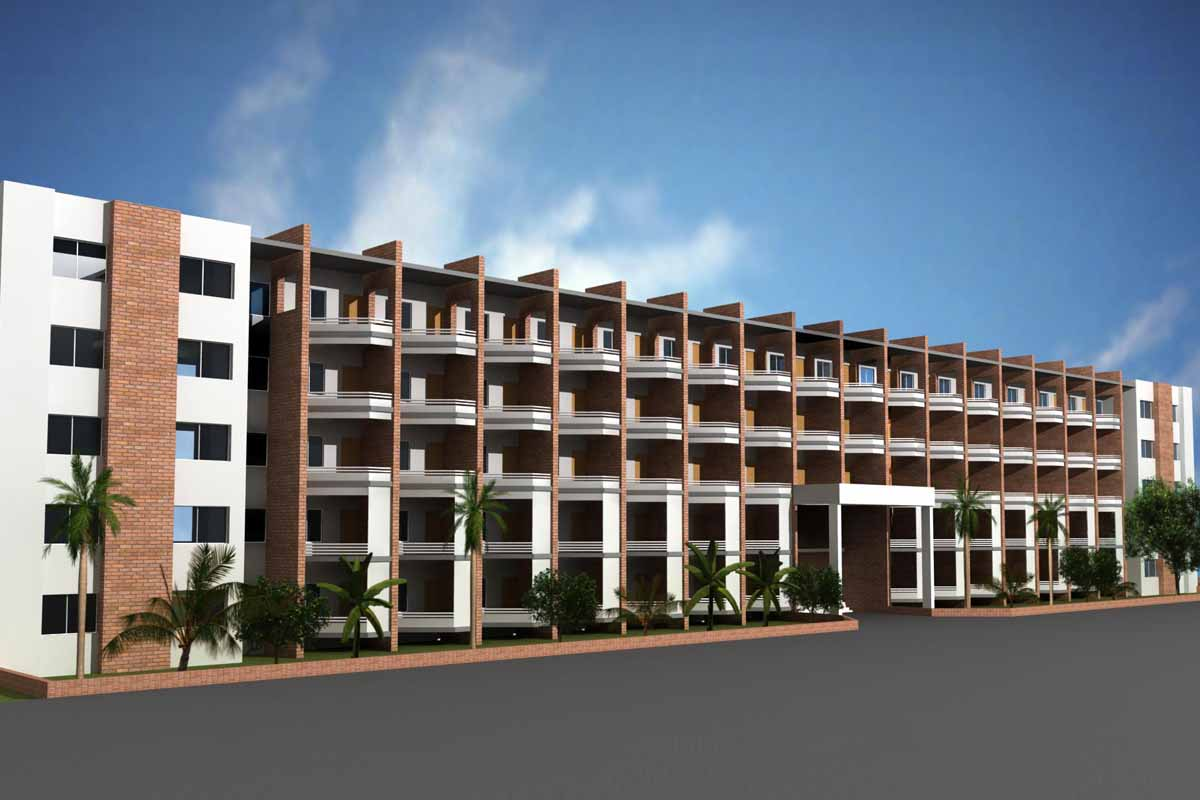
Shahid Moshiur Rahman Hall

This is a five-story building with a capacity for five hundred students. Like at other public universities in Bangladesh, there are many facilities available for the residential students, such as a TV room, a reading room, a gymnasium and a canteen.

==== Munshi Meherullah Hall ====
It's a newly built ten-story modern building with capacity of approximately one thousand male students. Lifts are used for conveniences of students. It comes with large reading room, gaming room, prayer room, two dining room.

==== Tapashi Rabeya Hall ====
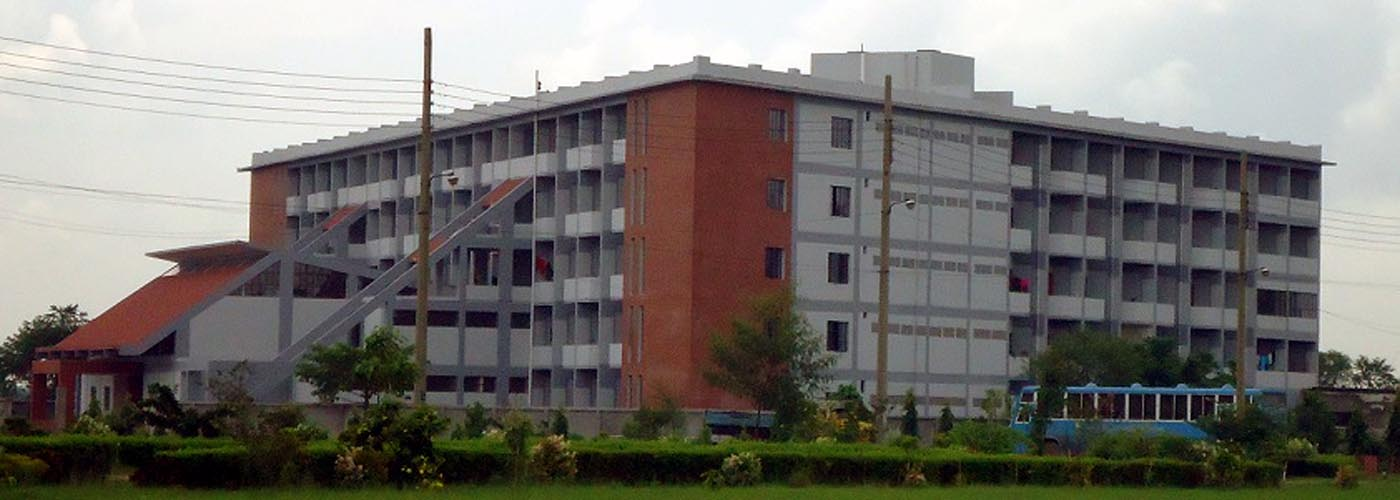
Tapashi Rabeya Hall

This is also a five-story, female-only building with a capacity for five hundred students. This residence hall has the same facilities available to students as Shaheed Moshiur Rahman Hall. Additionally, it has photocopying, printing, and laundry facilities for residents. The students and the organizing committee put together different game competitions from time to time.

==== Bir Protik Taramon Bibi Hall ====
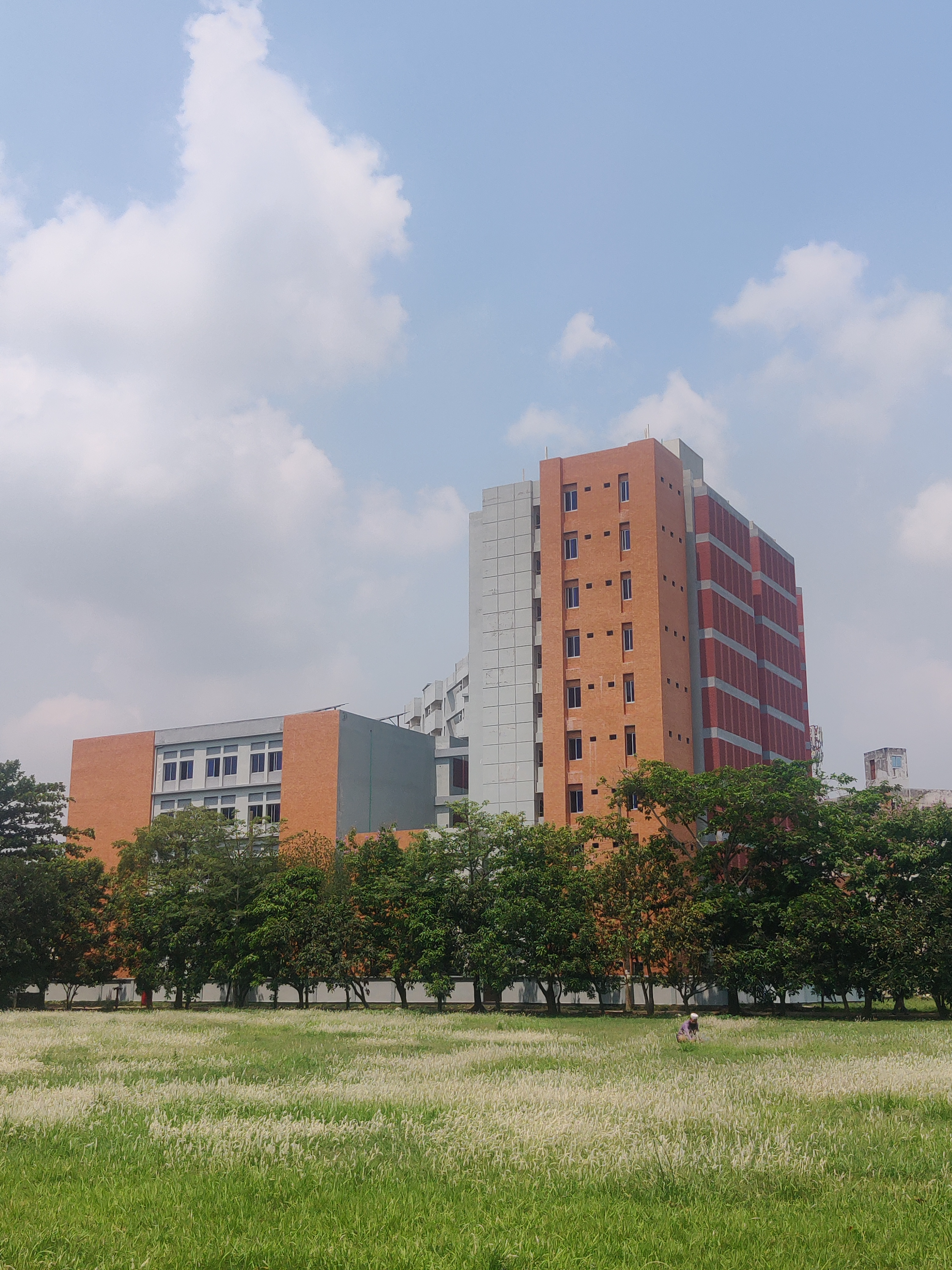
Bir Protik Taramon Bibi Hall

It's a newly built ten-story modern building with capacity of approximately one thousand female students.

=== Central Library ===
Jashore University of Science and Technology has a six-story library. Currently, there are approximately 30,000 books and 100 journals available for students and faculty members. New books are added to the collection every month. Students or faculty members can study and borrow books from the library. It is open from 9 am to 8 pm Saturday through Wednesday. An E-library service is also available.

=== Gymnasium ===
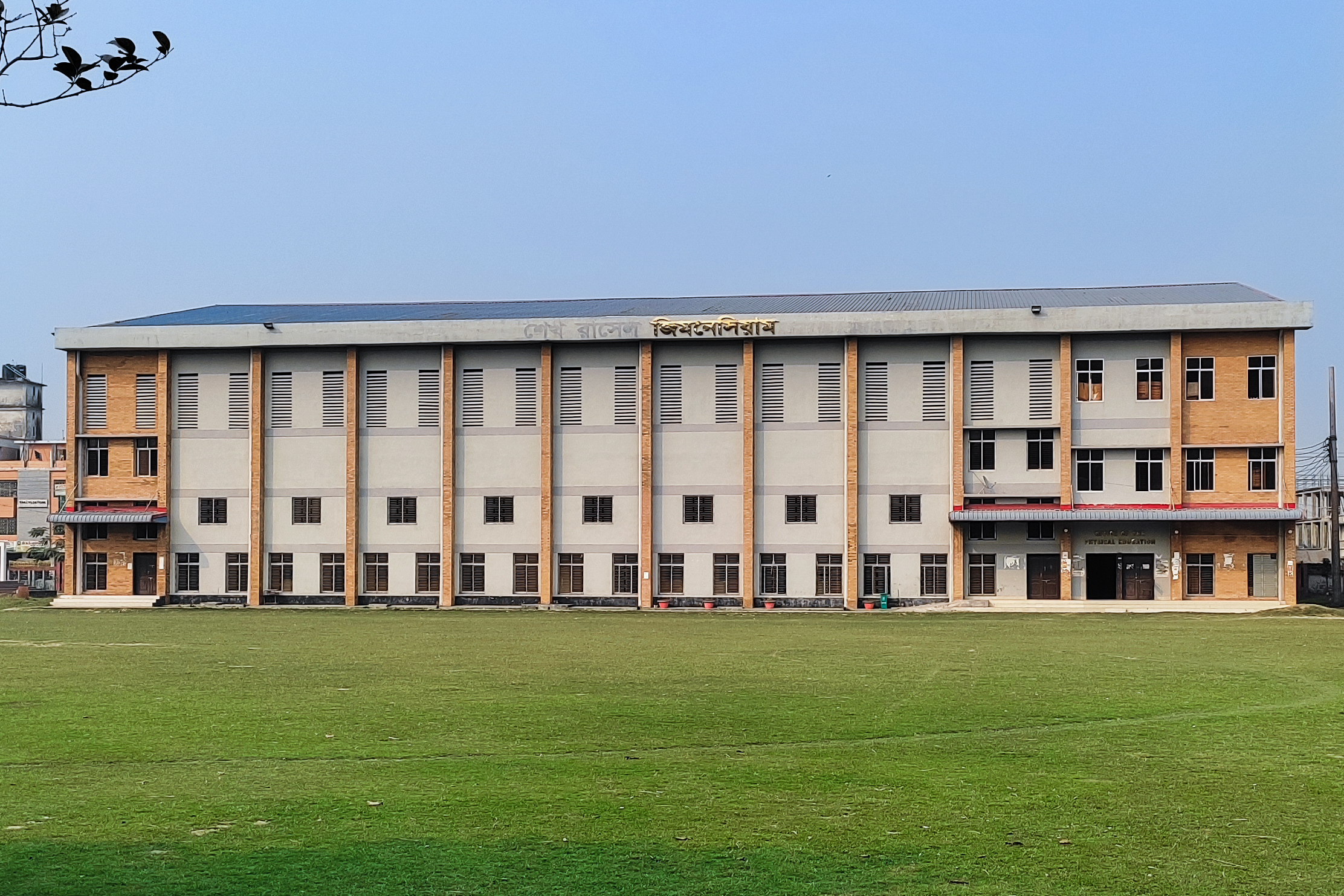
Gymnasium

To facilitate regular physical exercise and indoor games for students, there is a modern, well-equipped gymnasium adjacent to the Kabi Nazrul Academic Building, known as the Bir Sreshtho Hamidur Rahman Gymnasium.

=== TSC and cafeteria ===
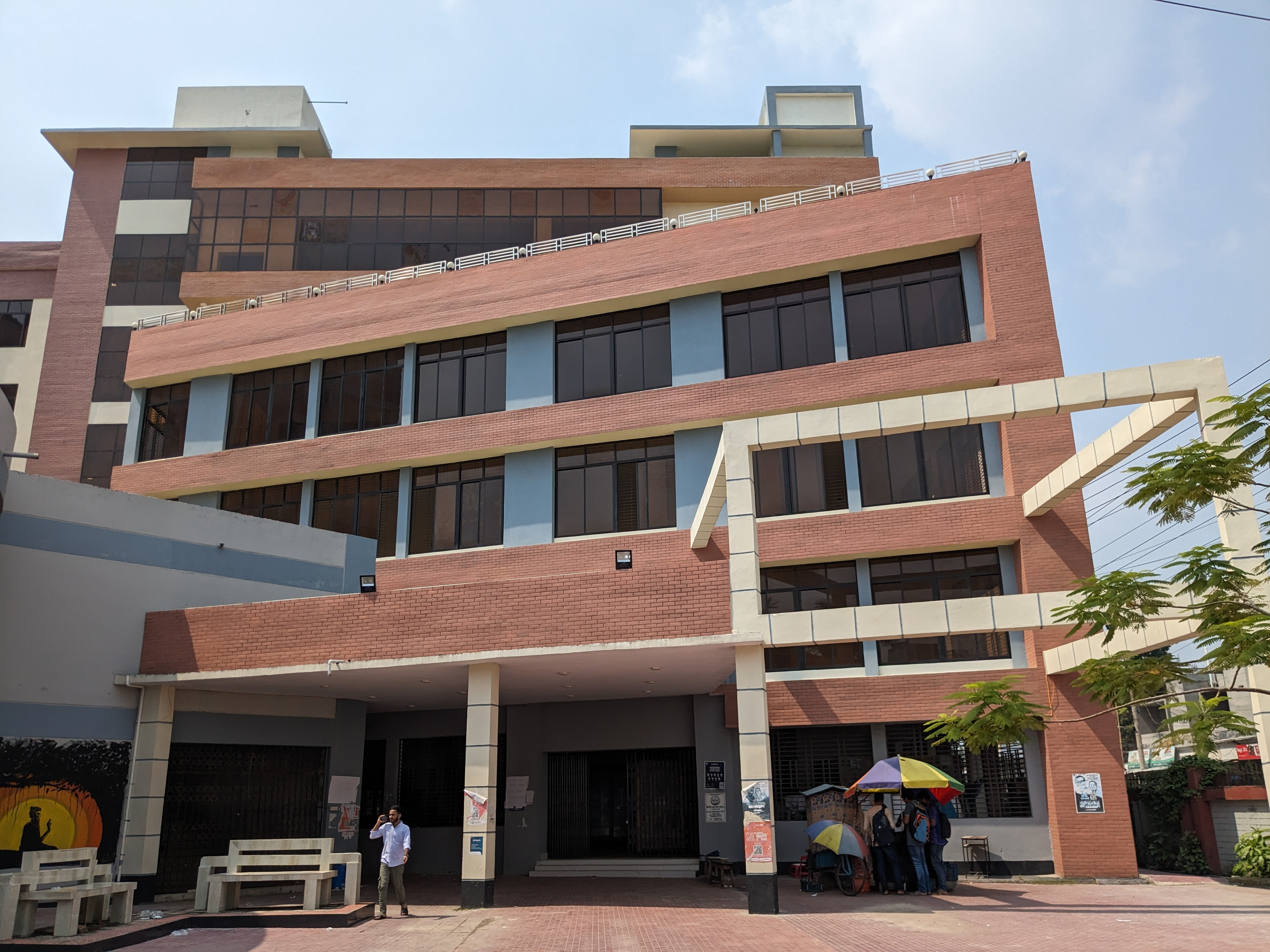
TSC and Cafeteria

This is a two-story building, located at the west-eastern corner of the campus. The cafeteria is on the ground floor and TSC is on the first floor. The food supplies come from a charity organization, the Jagannath Foundation.

=== BioSol Centre ===
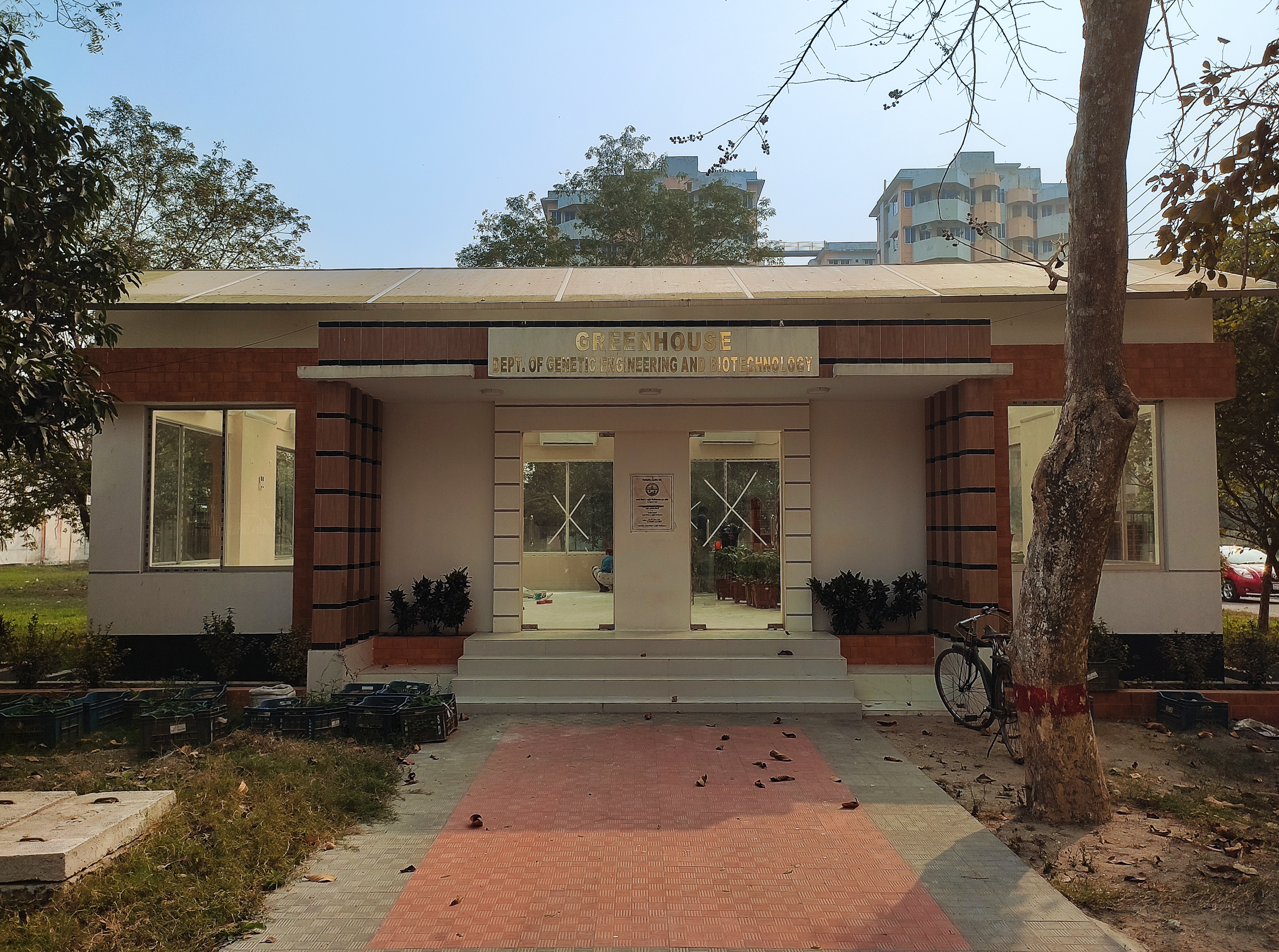
Green House

In October 2019, as part of JUST, started Biological Solution Center known as BioSol Centre. Recently, it is a well known research organization in Bangladesh. The ambition of BioSol Centre is to provide quality research and make collaborative research in Bangladesh as well as worldwide especially in Bioinformatics. For many years, BioSol Center has been cooperating with many scientists, including: Dr. Foysal Ahammed from King Abdulaziz University, Saudi Arabia and Prof. Tomasz M. Karpiński from Poznań University of Medical Sciences, Poland.

=== Dormitory and tower ===
The JUST dormitory is located at south-eastern corner of the campus. This five-storied dormitory is available for the faculty members and administrative staff of JUST. There is also a ten-story Madhumati tower for the faculty members and administrative staff of the university.

=== Central mosque ===
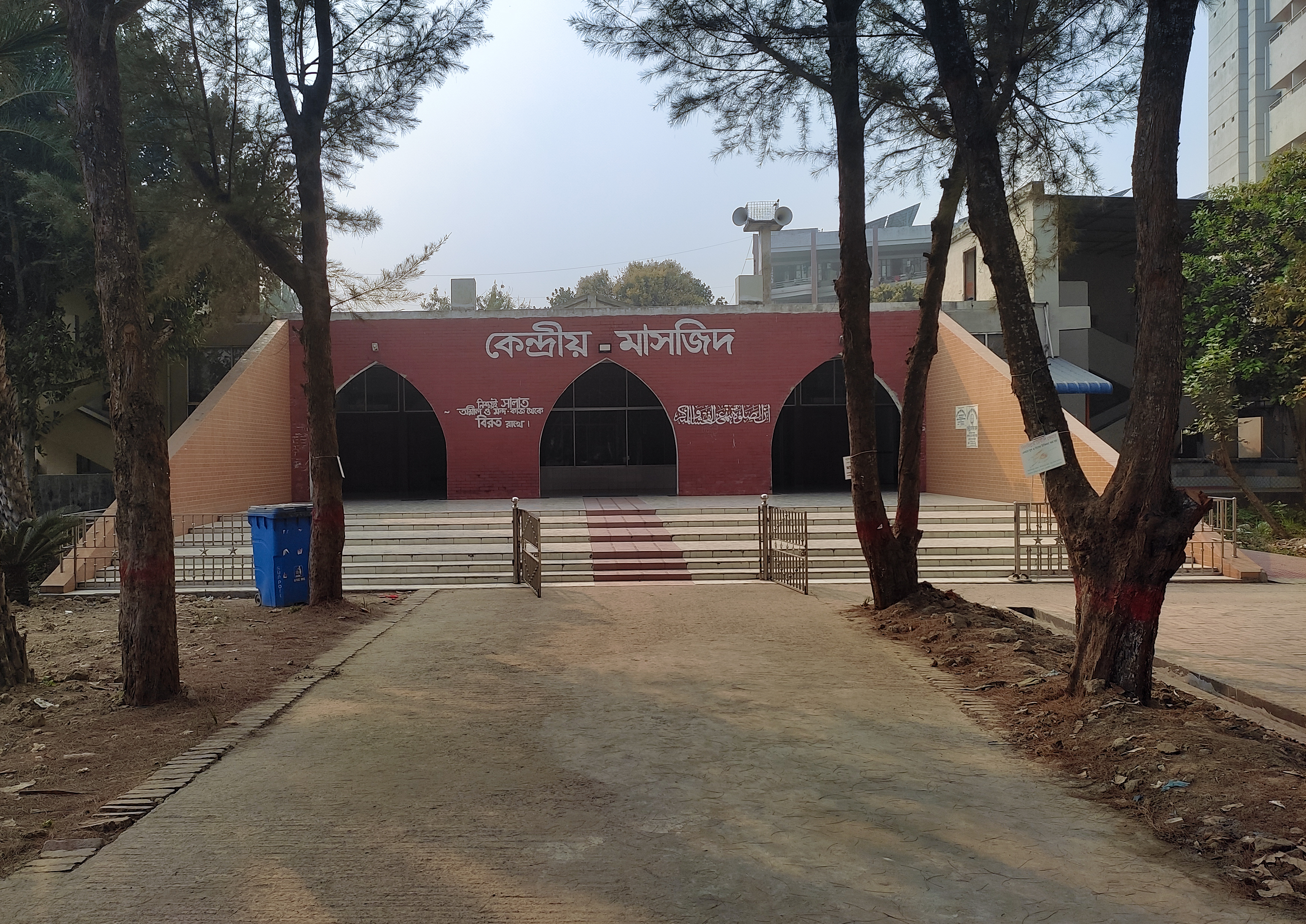
Central mosque

The Central Mosque is an example of modern architecture. It is located on the west side of the campus and serves as a place of worship for Muslim students and staff.

=== Sculpture ===
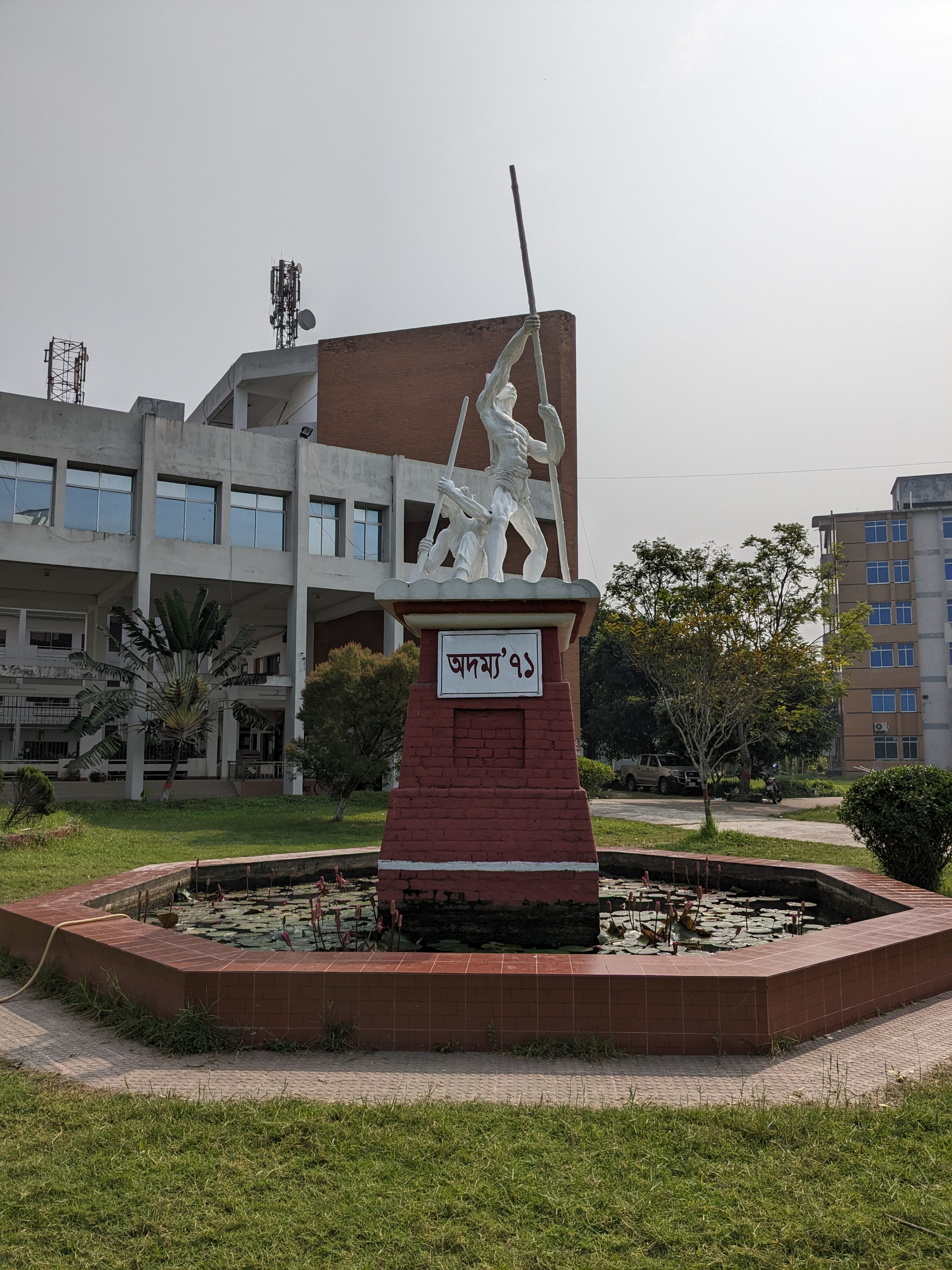
Indomitable 71

The concrete statue Adamya 71 (or Indomitable 71) stands in front of the administration building. Artist Mozai Zeevan Safori created it in 2013 to commemorate the Bangladesh Liberation War. It depicts two young freedom fighters, one male and one female, on their way home after the war. They are on a raft made of seven banana trees. The number seven references the historic 7 March Speech of Sheikh Mujibur Rahman, a pivotal moment in Bangladesh's path to independence.

The dimensions of the sculpture are rich in symbolic meaning. The base is surrounded by a hexagon made of bricks in two steps. The length of the base is 26 feet, which represents 26 March, Bangladesh's Independence Day. The total installed height is 21 feet, which signifies 21 February, International Mother Language Day. The height of the statue on its own comes to 16 feet, which denotes Bangladesh's Victory Day, 16 December. And the six levels of the stepped plinth reference the Six Point Movement led by Bangabandhu Sheikh Mujibur Rahman.

== Vice-chancellors ==
- Abdus Sattar (2009–2017)
- Anwar Hossain (2017–2024)
- Md. Abdul Majid (2024–2026)
- Dr. Yearul Kabir (2026–present)
