= Anwaar Hussain =

Justice of the Lahore High Court

- انوار حسین

Justice of the Lahore High Court
- Incumbent
- Assumed office 7 May 2021

Personal details
- Born: 16 January 1973 (age 53)
- Education: Master of Arts
- Alma mater: Punjab University Law College (LLB); Institute of Comparative Law (McGill University) (LLM)

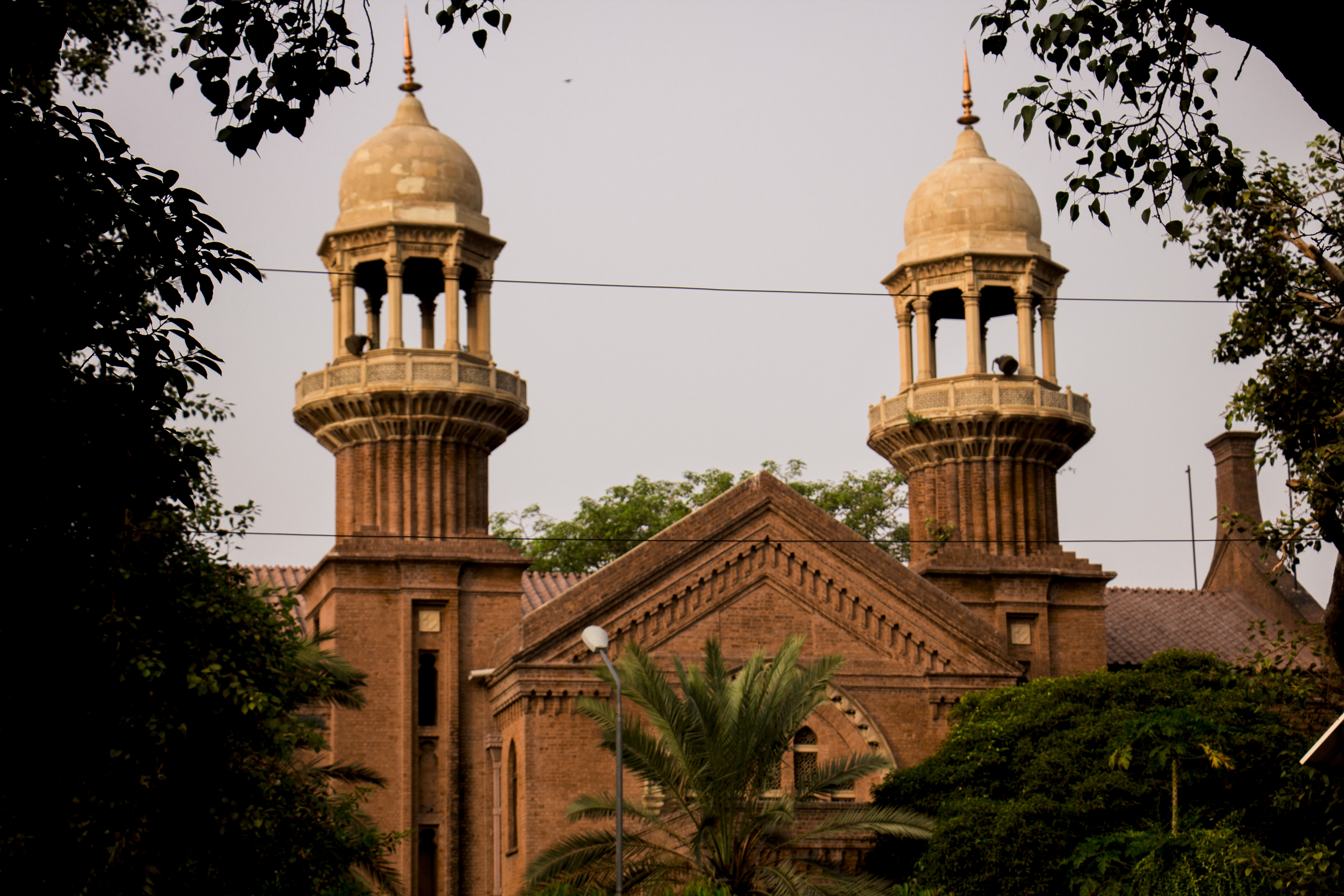
Lahore High Court

Anwaar Hussain (Urdu: انوار حسین, born 16 January 1973) is a Pakistani jurist who has been Justice of the Lahore High Court since 7 May 2021.

== Education ==
Hussain earned his law degree from Punjab University Law College, achieving University Distinctions in all three parts. He later pursued a master's degree in Political Science, securing the fifth position overall. Additionally, he obtained postgraduate diplomas in labor and intellectual property laws, securing first position in both courses.

His career includes a 14-year standing at the Bar, an LLM from the Institute of Comparative Law (McGill University).

== Career ==
Hussain enrolled as an advocate lower courts on 1 February 1999 and as advocate high court on 31 March 2001.

He also worked as a legal draftsman at the Law Parliamentary Affairs and Human Rights Department. During this time, he played a key role in drafting significant legislation, such as the Punjab Rented Premises Act, 2009. His research articles on trade and securities market arbitration have been published in the Superior Law Review; he also participated in the Public Interest Environmental Law Conference at the University of Oregon School of Law in 2014.

He was appointed as Assistant Advocate General Punjab on 5 May 2014.

Hussain ascended into Lahore High Court (LHC) as an additional justice on 7 May 2021. The Judicial Commission of Pakistan, led by then Chief Justice of Pakistan Umar Ata Bandial, officially confirmed his appointment as a permanent judge of LHC on 13 October 2022. He took the oath of office as a permanent judge of LHC on 4 November 2022.
