= Zaniar Moradi =

Kurd political prisoner (1987–2018)

- Born: 1983
- Died: 8 September 2018; Gohardasht Prison, Iran
- Conviction: Waging war against God
- Penalty: Death penalty

Zaniar Moradi (Persian: زانیار مرادی, 1987 – 8 September 2018) was a Kurd political prisoner from Marivan, Iran who was detained in 2009 along with his cousin Loghman Moradi. They were both executed on 8 September 2018 on the charge of killing the son of the Imam of Marivan's Friday prayers imam. Amnesty International has said that the men had been denied access to legal counsel after being arrested. After their sentences were issued, they wrote in a letter that they were forced to confess under duress and torture and that they had not played a part in the assassination. Moradi maintained that for nine months after his initial arrest, authorities had detained him for membership of the Komala Party.

== Zaniar Moradi’s letter to Asma Jahangir ==
In a letter addressed to Asma Jahangir, the Special Rapporteur on Human Rights in Iran, on 14 November 2016, which he co-wrote with his cousin Loghman, he detailed the torture and sexual threats that they were subjected to in order to make a confession. According to the letter, the judge overseeing the court had also stipulated that the case was incomplete and that there was not enough evidence against them.

== Death of his father ==
Eghbal Morad, father of Zaniar Moradi, was killed on 17 July 2018 near the Panjavin River in Sulaymaniyah, Iraq which borders the town of Marivan in Iran. According to a statement issued by the Kurdistan Human Rights Group, Eghbal Moradi was a leading member of the group. Before his death, he had rejected the charges against his son and nephew saying that his 20-year-old son was only following up his education.

== International reaction ==
Philip Luther, Amnesty International’s research and advocacy director for the middle east and North Africa condemned the execution of Zaniar Moradi and the other two prisoners and said:"“We are horrified by the news that the Iranian authorities have executed these men, despite widespread condemnation of their death sentences and calls from UN human rights experts and other bodies to halt their executions."

UN High Commissioner for Human Rights Michelle Bachelet said on the opening statement to the 39th Session of the Human Rights Council on 10 September: "... they were not afforded fair trials, and were subjected to torture. Recent arrests and ill-treatment of a number of human rights defenders and lawyers are deplorable. All those detained for peacefully exercising rights to freedom of expression and association should be released."

== See also ==
- Loghman Moradi
- Ramin Hossein-Panahi
