= Jamiat Ahle Hadith Jammu and Kashmir =

Islamic religious organization

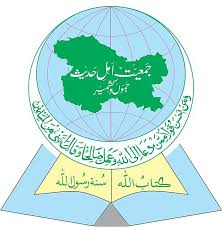
- Logo of Jamiat Ahle Hadith Jammu and Kashmir
- Predecessor: Anjuman e Ahle Hadith Kashmir
- Formation: 1923
- Founder: Anwar Shah Shopiani, Syed Hussain Shah
- Founded at: Srinagar, Jammu and Kashmir
- Type: Non-governmental organisation, Islamic non profit
- Legal status: Trust
- Purpose: Islamic puritan education, Humanitarian assistance
- Region served: Jammu and Kashmir
- Official language: Arabic, Kashmiri, Urdu, English
- President (Sadder): Dr Abdul Latif Al-Kindi
- Affiliations: Markazi Jamiat Ahl-e Hadith Hind
- Website: jahjk.org

Jamiat Ahle Hadith Jammu and Kashmir (lit. 'Organisation of the People of Hadith in Jammu and Kashmir') is a Salafi organization based in Srinagar, in Indian-administrated Jammu and Kashmir. The main motive of the organisation is to practice and propagate the Quran and Hadith in accordance to the Salafi thought. The Salafi movement emphasizes looking up to the era of the Salaf al-Salih; who were the early three generations of Muslims that succeeded Prophet Muhammad. They consider the faith and practices of Salaf al-Salih as virtuous and exemplary. By seeking to capture values of the Salaf in their own lives, Salafis attempt to recreate a 'golden age', and revive a pristine version of Islam, stripped of all later accretions, including the four schools of law as well as Sufism.

== History ==
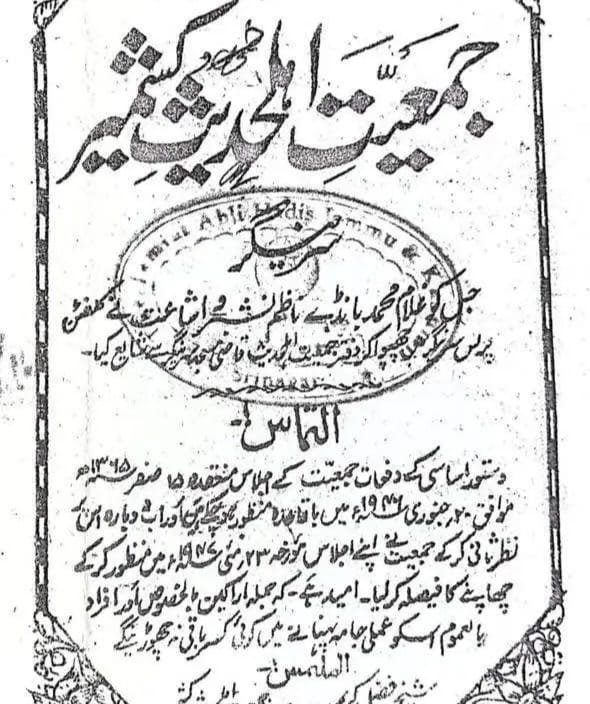
Constitution of Jamiat Ahle Hadith Kashmir enacted on 20 January 1946

Ahle Hadith movement emerged in Kashmir in 19th century under Syed Hussain Shah a resident of Srinagar who was a student of Syed Nazeer Husain. Hussain Shah's campaign against grave veneration and other traditional practices resulted him being expelled from Srinagar by Maharaja Ranbir Singh to Shopian where he was joined by Anwar Shah Shopiani and together they began preaching Ahle Hadith thought. Sir Walter Lawrence in his book The Valley of Kashmir states that in the year 1885 during his visit to Kashmir, he found around two hundred families were practinig Ahle Hadith theology in Shopian town. The first Ahle Hadith Mosque of Kashmir was built in the year 1897 in Zaldagar area of Srinagar by Anwar Shah Shopiani and Molvi Hassan Shah (elder brother of Mirwaiz Yusuf Shah). In 1923 Anjuman Ahle Hadith Kashmir was formed in Srinagar with Haji Mohammad Shahdad elected as its first President. It was renamed as Jamiat Ahle Hadith in the year 1944 during the tenure of Maulana Ghulam Nabi Mubarki.

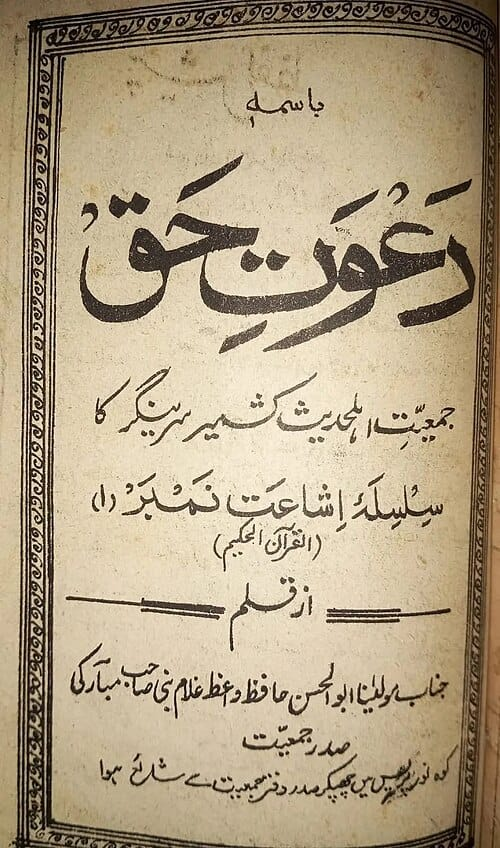
Dawat e Haq Journal of Jamiat Ahle Hadith

As of October 2026, Dr. Abdul Lateef Al-Kindi is its current president for a three-year term, while Mushtaq Ahmad Wani serves as the general secretary. Mufti Muhammad Yaqoob Baba Al-Madani serves as the grand mufti.

== Education And Teachings ==
It is primarily a Socio-Religious organisation devoted to the propagation of Islamic teachings in Jammu and Kashmir. It operates diagnostic centres for poor and a charity hospital in Srinagar. It also operates modern contemporary educational institutions, which include higher secondary school, high schools and primary schools.

== Notable people ==
- Mohammad Anwar Shopiani
- Syed Hussain Shah
- Abdul Gani Shopiani
- Ghulam Nabi Mubarki
- Sofi Nazir Ahmad Kashmiri
