= Anwar Ali =

Anwar Ali may refer to:

== People ==
- Anwar Ali (actor) (born 1938), Indian actor and producer
- Anwar Ali (banker) (1913–1974), Pakistani economist
- Anwar Ali (cricketer) (born 1987), Pakistani international cricketer
- Anwar Ali (footballer, born 1984) (born 1984), Indian footballer
- Anwar Ali (footballer, born 2000) (born 2000), Indian footballer
- Anwar Ali (Pakistani politician), Pakistani politician
- Anwar Ali (physicist) (born 1943), Pakistani physicist
- Anwar Ali (poet) (born 1966), Indian poet, translator, and documentary filmmaker
