= Anuar Guerrero =

Colombian footballer (born 1979)

Personal information
- Full name: Anuar Francisco Guerrero Olmos
- Date of birth: 3 April 1979 (age 47)
- Place of birth: Santa Marta, Colombia
- Height: 1.76 m (5 ft 9 in)
- Position: Defender

Team information
- Current team: América de Cali
- Number: 23

Senior career*
Years	Team	Apps	(Gls)
2001–2003	Unión Magdalena		
2004–2008	Boyacá Chicó		
2008	Millonarios		
2009–2010	Patriotas		
2010	América de Cali		
- * Club domestic league appearances and goals as of 5 August 2008

Anuar Francisco Guerrero Olmos (Note: In this Spanish name, the first or paternal surname is Guerrero and the second or maternal family name is Olmos.) (born 3 April 1979), known as Anuar Guerrero, is a Colombian football forward, who currently plays for América de Cali in the Copa Mustang.
