= Anwar Shahadat =

Anwar Shahadat is a Bangladeshi born US-based writer, filmmaker, and journalist. He has three published books; two short story collections and a novel. He has shot a couple of short films and a feature film.

== Career and works ==
Shahadat started his career as journalist. He then served as a Political and Diplomatic Correspondent for a daily newspaper in Bangladesh. He was editor of a political weekly news magazine.

His published books include Hele Chasha Joal Brittanto, Canvasser Golpokar, and Sanjoa Tole Murga. His short films include Printer Perfect, Falling Leaves, As It Should be, and Nanny.

He has also shot a feature film named; Karigor (The Circumciser).
