= Anwar Hasan Rizvi =

Brigadier Saiyed Anwar Hasan Rizvi MC
- Military career
- Allegiance: British India (1943-1947); India (1947-1969)
- Branch: British Indian Army; Indian Army
- Service years: 1943–1969
- Rank: Brigadier
- Service number: IEC-4247 (emergency commission); IC-1865 (regular commission)
- Unit: First Battalion, The Bihar Regiment, 38 Medium Regiment
- Conflicts: World War II; Burma campaign
- Awards: Military Cross

Brigadier Saiyed Anwar Hasan Rizvi MC was a decorated Indian Army officer who received the Military Cross in the Burma Campaign during the Second World War.

== Life and career ==
Rizvi was from Allahabad, and received an emergency commission as a second lieutenant in the Bihar Regiment on 28 February 1943. As a war-substantive lieutenant during the Burma Campaign, he fought with the Lushai Brigade and was awarded a Military Cross (MC) for his heroism.

The citation recommending Rizvi for a Military Cross runs as follows:

16 October 1944

W. S. Lieut. SAIYED ANWAR HASAN RIZVI, 1st Bihar Regiment

Area HAKA-FALAM road.

On 16 October 1944 Lieutenant RIZVI when leading a patrol of 4 sections, came across signs of further evacuation of Pioneer Camp. He tracked the enemy to TIHPUL village and overtook them. He saw about 150 Japs and INA including 3 officers in the area about 100 yards away. Disregarding the numerical superiority of the enemy and at considerable risk to himself and his men he advanced within 50 yards and opened fire on the enemy and took them completely by surprise causing 9 casualties. By his cool and determined action in the face of grave danger he was a great inspiration to his men.

After the war, Rizvi remained in the British Indian Army and opted to continue serving in the Indian Army post-Indian independence. He received a regular commission in the artillery, and was promoted to major on 28 February 1956. As a lieutenant-colonel, he was given command of an infantry brigade on 10 December 1964. He was promoted to the substantive rank of colonel on 22 December 1965, and to substantive brigadier on 12 November 1967. On 11 January 1968, he was appointed Commander, Lucknow Sub-Area, and took retirement on 16 December 1969.

== Awards and decorations ==

General Service Medal 1947	Indian Independence Medal	20 Years Long Service Medal	9 Years Long Service Medal
Military Cross	1939–1945 Star	Burma Star	War Medal 1939–1945
