= WikiStage =

Video platform

WikiStage Association
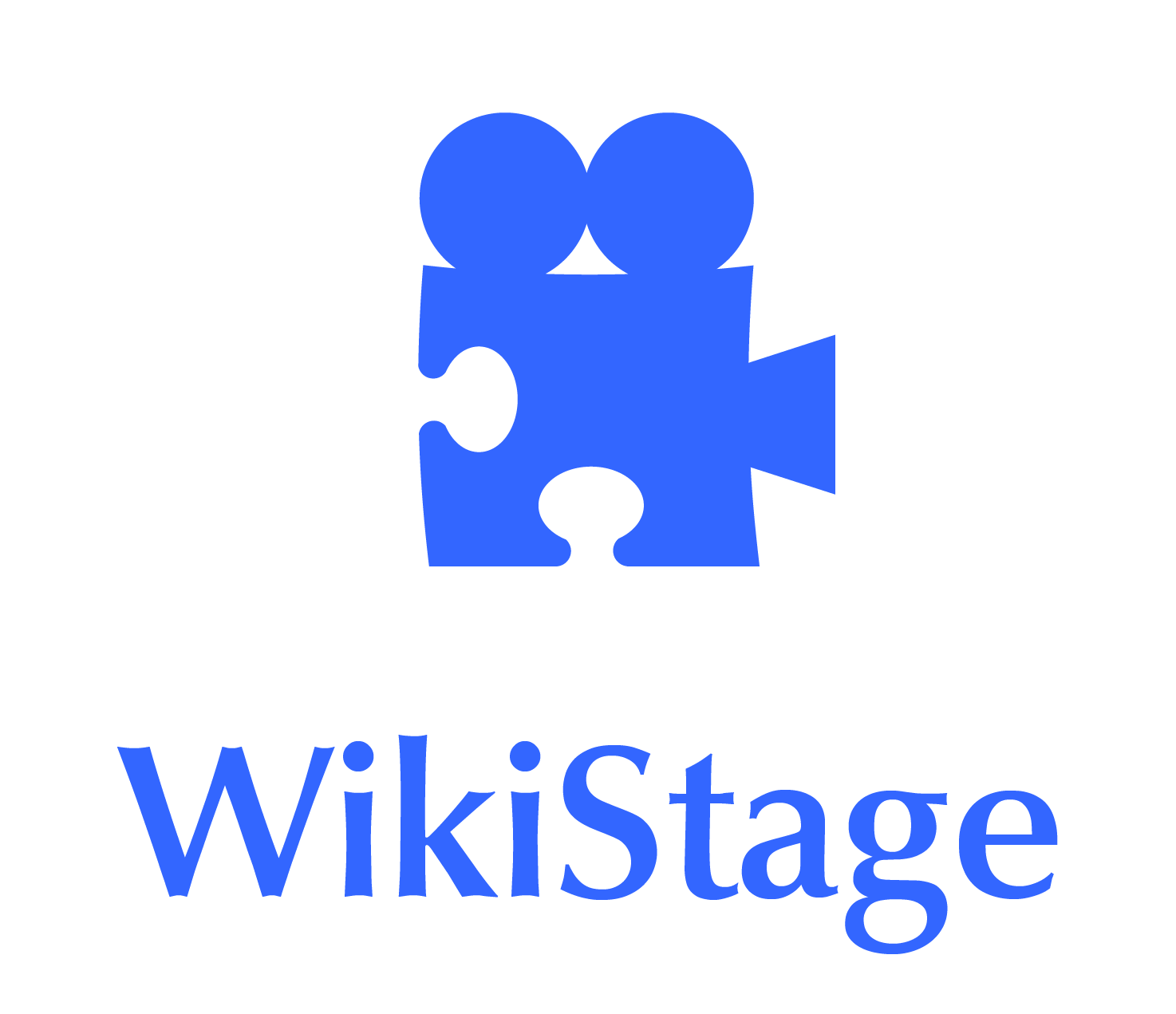
- The WikiStage puzzle piece symbolises the collaborative nature of the project.
- Formation: 2013
- Founder: Johannes Bittel
- Founded at: Paris
- Type: Association
- Legal status: Non-profit
- Purpose: Educational
- Headquarters: Paris, Berlin
- Official language: English, French
- Leader: Johannes Bittel
- Website: http://www.wikistage.org

WikiStage is a video platform and a network of event organizers managed by the non-profit WikiStage Association. It aims to create a collaborative video platform for public debate. Conferences worldwide use the WikiStage platform to share their speaker’s videos; to contextualize presentations, the videos are grouped into "debates" based on their subject matter. The debate wall allows users to watch and vote for short videos from various sources regarding the topic in question.

In addition to partnering with conferences around the world, WikiStage allows the members of its community to organise WikiStage branded conferences under the WikiStage license for free. The talks filmed at these conferences are then published on the WikiStage website and YouTube to ensure unlimited, free access. A community of over 100 volunteers in 12 countries is spread over 4 continents to curate the video library.

== Origin of the Name ==
According to the founder, the "Wiki" brand was chosen because the organisation follows the objectives and values of other Wiki Projects: to create a library of knowledge through an open and collaborative approach where the users produce the content. WikiStage is an independent organisation and uses the protected trademarks “WikiStage” and “WikiTalk”.

== Objectives ==
The primary objective of WikiStage is to facilitate democratic discourse by providing a platform for experts to present ideas on a global scale. Defining its mission as providing a "stage for the world's most interesting questions," the organization utilizes a network of international events and a dedicated video-based debate platform to disseminate information. Through these initiatives, WikiStage seeks to “improve education and strengthen democratic debate.”

== The WikiTalk ==
The presentations published on WikiStage are called WikiTalks. The short talks of three, six or nine minutes each address a specific topic and cover questions ranging from history and philosophy to genetics, and jazz. Promotional presentations or extreme views in WikiTalks are not allowed.

WikiTalks are typically filmed at conferences, but they can also be recorded with just a camera and a speaker. A recording session of five to ten experts is called a 'WikiCorner' and can be organised by anyone after acquiring a WikiCorner license.

== WikiStage Events ==
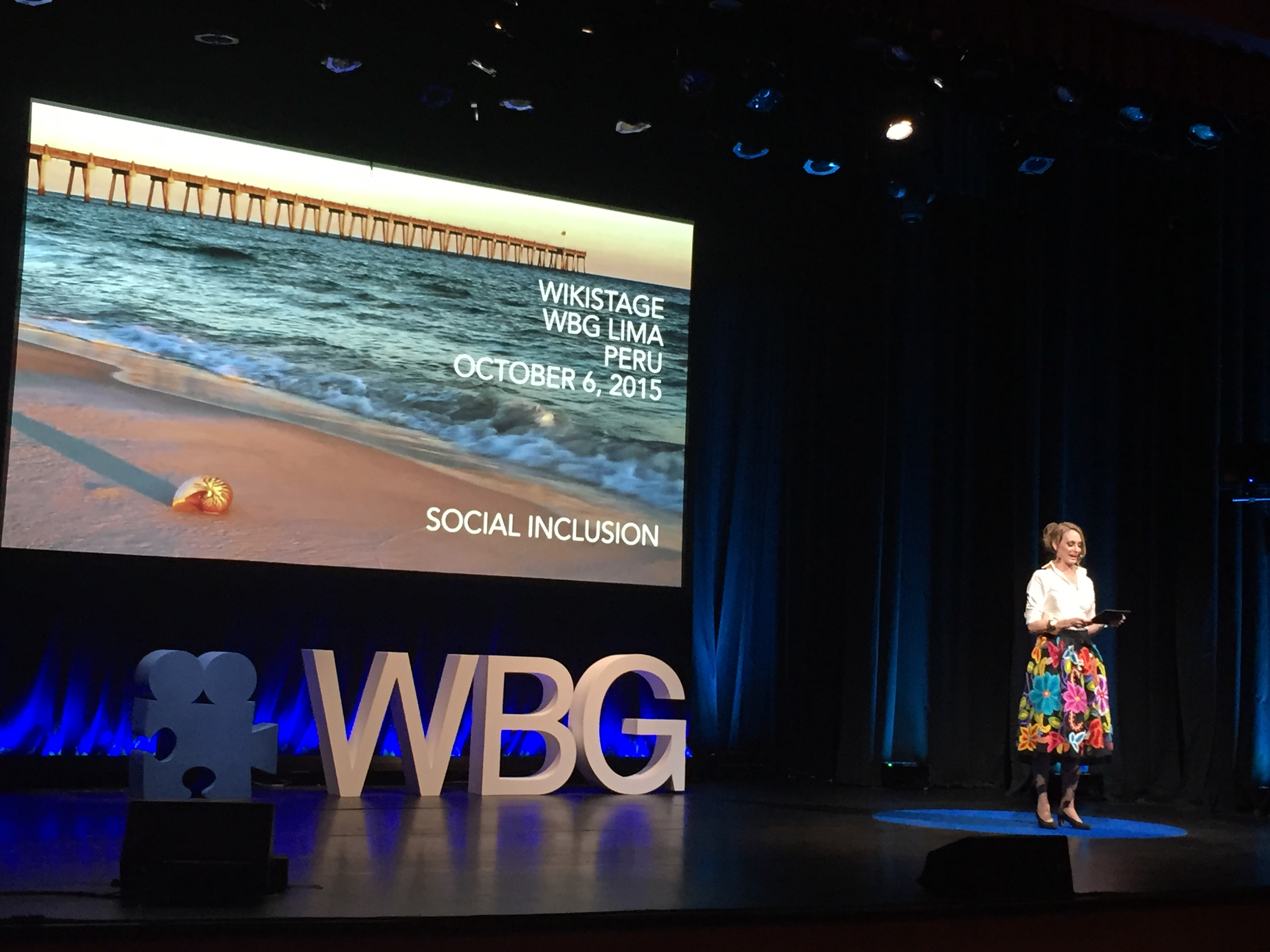
WikiStage World Bank Group in Lima, Peru

The first WikiStage Event took place at ESCP Europe Paris in March 2013 under the motto “Celebrate Curiosity”. Subsequently, WikiStage spread in other French schools such as Sciences Po, École Centrale Paris and Paris Dauphine University. Up until July 2016, seventy events have been held at institutions like the Chamber of Commerce in Nouakchott, Mauretania, Stanford University and the Worldbank.

WikiStage Events are organised collaboratively under the free license granted by the WikiStage Association. Anyone may request to organise a WikiStage Event. Once the license is granted, the WikiStage Association provides the local organisers with support, toolkits and guides. The local organiser designs the program of the event, records the talks and performances, then edits and uploads them to the WikiStage YouTube channel and website. Speakers are asked to prepare their talk prior to the event and encouraged to share their talks under the Creative Commons license.
