= Anwar Mediero =

Ethiopian footballer

Personal information
- Full name: Anwar Mediero Rodríguez
- Date of birth: 3 March 2002 (age 24)
- Place of birth: Addis Ababa, Ethiopia
- Height: 1.82 m (6 ft 0 in)
- Position: Forward

Team information
- Current team: Hrvatski dragovoljac
- Number: 11

Youth career
- 2009–2010: Victoria
- 2010–2015: Celta
- 2015–2020: Barcelona
- 2020–2022: Atalanta
- 2022: → Hellas Verona (loan)

Senior career*
Years	Team	Apps	(Gls)
2022–2023	Fursan Hispania	11	(1)
2023–2024	Polvorín	23	(2)
2024	Ourense	4	(0)
2024	Santa Marta	2	(0)
2026–	Hrvatski dragovoljac	5	(0)
- * Club domestic league appearances and goals as of 18:04, 26 October 2026 (UTC)

Anwar Mediero Rodríguez (born 3 March 2002) is an Ethiopian footballer who plays as a forward for Croatian club Hrvatski dragovoljac.

== Early life ==
Born in Addis Ababa, Ethiopia, Anwar Mediero was adopted by Belén Mediero, a Spanish woman from Vigo who worked at the Casa de la Juventud de Vigo (Vigo Youth Center). Belén Mediero travelled to Addis Ababa, where she met Ethiopian laboratory technician Alemaio Digate, who spoke Spanish. The pair married in Ethiopia, and after settling bureaucractic issues, Digate moved to Spain to join Belén and Anwar.

== Career ==
Mediero started his career with local side Victoria at the age of seven, before joining Celta a year later. After five years with Celta, he was poached by Barcelona, a move which was investigated by FIFA, leading to Barcelona being sanctioned and Mediero being suspended for a year. Two serious injuries, one in 2017 and one in his final season with the club, hindered his game time at La Masia, and in 2020 he moved to Italy to sign for Atalanta. He won the Supercoppa Primavera in his first season with the club. In January 2022, he was loaned to Hellas Verona.

In December 2022, Mediero moved to the United Arab Emirates to sign for First Division League side Fursan Hispania, owned by former Celta player Míchel Salgado. After just a year in the United Arab Emirates, he returned to Spain, joining the reserve side of Lugo, Polvorín.

Despite featuring regularly for Polvorín, Mediero joined fellow-Tercera Federación club Ourense in July 2024. However, he left the club in November of the same year, having made just four appearances. Just days after leaving Ourense, he signed for Santa Marta, but would only make two appearances before leaving the club at the end of 2024.

In August 2026, Mediero joined Croatian Prva NL club Hrvatski dragovoljac.

== Career statistics ==
As of match played 26 October 2026

Appearances and goals by club, season and competition
Club	Season	League			Cup (Note: Includes UAE President's Cup, Copa del Rey and Croatian Football Cup)		Other		Total	
Club	Season	Division	Apps	Goals	Apps	Goals	Apps	Goals	Apps	Goals
Fursan Hispania	2022–23	UAE Division 1	11	1	1	0	–		12	1
Polvorín	2023–24	Tercera Federación	23	2	0	0	–		23	2
Ourense	2024–25	Tercera Federación	4	0	0	0	–		4	0
Santa Marta	2024–25	Tercera Federación	2	0	0	0	–		2	0
Hrvatski dragovoljac	2026–27	Druga NL	5	0	1	0	1 (Note: Appearances in the Zagreb FA Cup)	0	7	0
Career total			45	3	2	0	1	0	48	3
