= Anwar Hossain (model) =

Bangladeshi actor and model

- Born: Md Anwar Hossain; March 11, 1993 (age 33); Nager Char, Titas, Comilla, Bangladesh
- Occupations: Actor, model
- Years active: 2011–present
- Known for: Poramon 2 (2018), Dahan (2018), Rajkumar (2024)
- Awards: BABISAS Award (2020); Friends View Star Award (2021); TRUB Award (2021)
- Website: www.actoranwar.com

Md Anwar Hossain (born 11 March 1993) is a Bangladeshi actor and model. He began his acting career in television dramas and made his film debut with Poramon 2 (2018). He has appeared in television dramas, commercials, music videos, and films in Bangladesh’s entertainment industry.

== Early life ==
Hossain was born in Nager Char, Titas Upazila, Comilla District, Bangladesh. He completed his early education in Dhaka and earned a bachelor's degree in Bengali from the University of Dhaka.

== Career ==
Hossain began his acting career with the television drama Ambition and subsequently appeared in several notable television productions.

He made his film debut with Poramon 2 (2018), and subsequently appeared in:

- Dahan (2018)
- Avatar (2019)
- Prem Chor (2019)
- Nabab LLB (2020)
- Rajkumar (2024)

== Awards and recognition ==
- BABISAS Award – Best Actor (2020)
- Friends View Star Award (2021)
- TRUB Award (2021)
- Bengal International Excellence Award (2022)
- Bangladesh International Fame Award (2022)
- Bangla Bijoy Bohor Award – Outstanding Performance in Bangladeshi Film and Television Media (2023)

== See also ==
- Cinema of Bangladesh
- List of Bangladeshi actors
