= Anwar Hossain (microbiologist) =

Bangladeshi microbiologist and academic

Anwar Hossain is a Bangladeshi biologist and former vice-chancellor of Jashore University of Science and Technology. Hossain was a professor of the Department of Microbiology at the University of Dhaka.

== Early life and education ==
Hossain was born on 1 January 1958 in Satgharia, Louhajang Upazila, Munshiganj District, East Pakistan, Pakistan. He did his bachelors and masters in Biochemistry and Molecular Biology at the University of Dhaka in 1981 and 1983 respectively. He did his PhD at the University of Tokyo in 1991.

== Career ==
In 1984, Hossain joined the University of Dhaka as a lecturer in the Department of Microbiology. He was promoted to Assistant Professor in 1991 and Associate Processor in 1995.

From 2009 to 2012, Hossain was the chairperson of the Department of Microbiology.

Hossain was appointed the vice-chancellor of Jashore University of Science and Technology in May 2017 by President Mohammad Abdul Hamid. He replaced Dr. Md. Abdus Sattar. In February 2019, 20 department heads of the Jashore University of Science and Technology following an assault on Professor Iqbal Kabir Zahid, President of the Jashore University of Science and Technology Teachers Association, by activists of Bangladesh Chhatra League, the student wing of the governing Awami League. In April 2020, Hossain donated one day salary of the university staff to the Prime Minister's Relief and Welfare Fund.

In June 2021, Hossain was re-appointed the vice-chancellor of Jashore University of Science and Technology. In 2022, he was awarded the Ekushey Padak for his contribution to the sciences. In April 2022, animal rights activists called for him to investigate the illegal culling of stray dogs on the campus of the university.

== Personal life ==
Hossain is married to Bilkis Ferdousi, head of the department of economics at Habibullah Bahar College. Their two sons live in Canada and the United States.
