= Anwarul Quader =

Bangladeshi politician

Member of Bangladesh Parliament
- In office 1973–1976

Personal details
- Party: Awami League

Anwarul Quader (Bengali: আনোয়ারুল কাদের) is an Awami League politician in Bangladesh and a former member of parliament for Mymensingh-12.

== Career ==
Quader was elected to parliament from Mymensingh-12 as an Awami League candidate in 1973.
