= Anwar Hossain (footballer, born 1979) =

Bangladeshi footballer

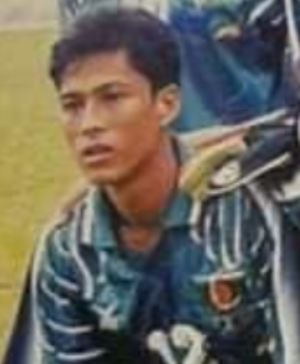
- Anwar with Bangladesh at the 1999 SA Games

Personal information
- Full name: Anwar Hossain
- Date of birth: 1 January 1979 (age 47)
- Place of birth: Chittagong, Bangladesh
- Positions: Attacking midfielder; left wing-back

Senior career*
Years	Team	Apps	(Gls)
1995–1996	Sadharan Bima		
1997–1998	Victoria		
1999	Mohammedan		
2000	Rahmatganj		
2001–2003	Mohammedan		
2004–2006	Sheikh Russel		
2007–2010	Agrani Bank		

International career
1994	Bangladesh U16		
1996	Bangladesh U19		
1999–2000	Bangladesh		
Medal record
Representing Bangladesh
South Asian Games
Gold medal – first place	1999 Kathmandu
- * Club domestic league appearances and goals

Anwar Hossain (Bengali: আনোয়ার হোসেন; born 1 January 1979) is a retired Bangladeshi footballer who played as a attacking-midfielder or left wing-back. He played for the Bangladesh national team from 1999 to 2000.

== Club career ==
Anwar began his Dhaka Premier Division League career with in Sadharan Bima CSC 1995, before moving to Victoria SC in the 1997–98 season and suffering relegation. Nevertheless, he joined Mohammedan SC the following season, winning the Premier Division title along with the All Airlines Gold Cup in India. In 2004, he joined Sheikh Russel KC, before transferring to Agrani Bank remaining in the then turned second-tier following the introduction of the B.League in 2007.

== International career ==
Anwar represented Bangladesh at youth level, before being called up by Bangladesh national team head coach, Samir Shaker, ahead of the 1999 Bangabandhu Cup. Following this, he represented the team at the 1999 South Asian Games as Bangladesh won gold for the first time. In November 1999, he represented the team in the 2000 AFC Asian Cup qualification. The following year, he featured for the team in the MFF Golden Jubilee Tournament in Maldives.

== Honours ==
Mohammedan SC

- Dhaka Premier Division League: 1999, 2002
- All Airlines Gold Cup: 1999

Bangladesh

- South Asian Games Gold medal: 1999
