= Anwar Lal Dean =

Pakistani politician

Senator Anwar Lal Dean

Member of the Senate of Pakistan
- In office 12 March 2018 – 11 March 2024

Personal details
- Party: Pakistan Peoples Party

Anwar Lal Dean, born in December 1956, is a Pakistani politician who has served a Member of the Senate of Pakistan from March 2018 to March 2024. He hails from Ladyei village, Sialkot District of Punjab, Pakistan. Dean is a member of the Pakistan Peoples Party (PPP) and was elected to the Senate on a minority seat from Sindh during the 2018 Pakistani Senate election.

== Political career ==
Dean's political journey began in Karachi, where he spent much of his life, with the National Students Federation during his college years. In the early 1970s, he joined the PPP in 1985 and build over the years a career within the party, serving as the divisional president of the minority wing and as a special assistant to former Chief Minister Syed Qaim Ali Shah.

He took oath as Senator on 12 March 2018.

== Private ==
Daen, a christian, has six daughters and a son. Known for his modest lifestyle, he lives in a rented two-bedroom apartment in Karachi's Saddar area and is often seen riding his motorcycle.
