= Anuar Dyusembaev =

Kazakh mathematician (born 1953)

Dyusembaev A.E.
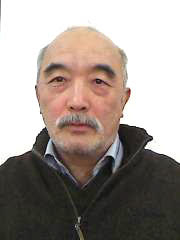
- Born: 1953 (age 72–73); Almaty, Kazakhstan
- Education: Saint Petersburg State University
- Occupations: Professor at Al-Farabi Kazakh National University, Department of Information Systems

Dyusembaev Anuar (born 1953) is a Kazakh mathematician.

== Biography ==
Anuar Dyusembaev graduated from the Saint Petersburg State University, the math department of the faculty, the Department of Computer Science (department of Svyatoslav Lavrov) in 1975, the department of mathematics. Ph.D. specialty 01.01.09.- mathematical cybernetics, a place of protection of the Computer Center of the Academy of Sciences of the USSR (Moscow) 1984 Doctor of physico-mathematical sciences, specialty 05.13.17.- theoretical bases of informatics, consultant academician Zhuravlev Yu.I., a place of protection of the Computing Center of the Russian Academy of Sciences (Moscow, 1994). Publications - journals of the Academy of Sciences of the USSR, RAS, USA, monograph "Mathematical models of program segmentation" published by Fizmatlit (MAIK, Nauka) 2001. Moscow, "Programmer's Library" series, 208 pp. And other publications.

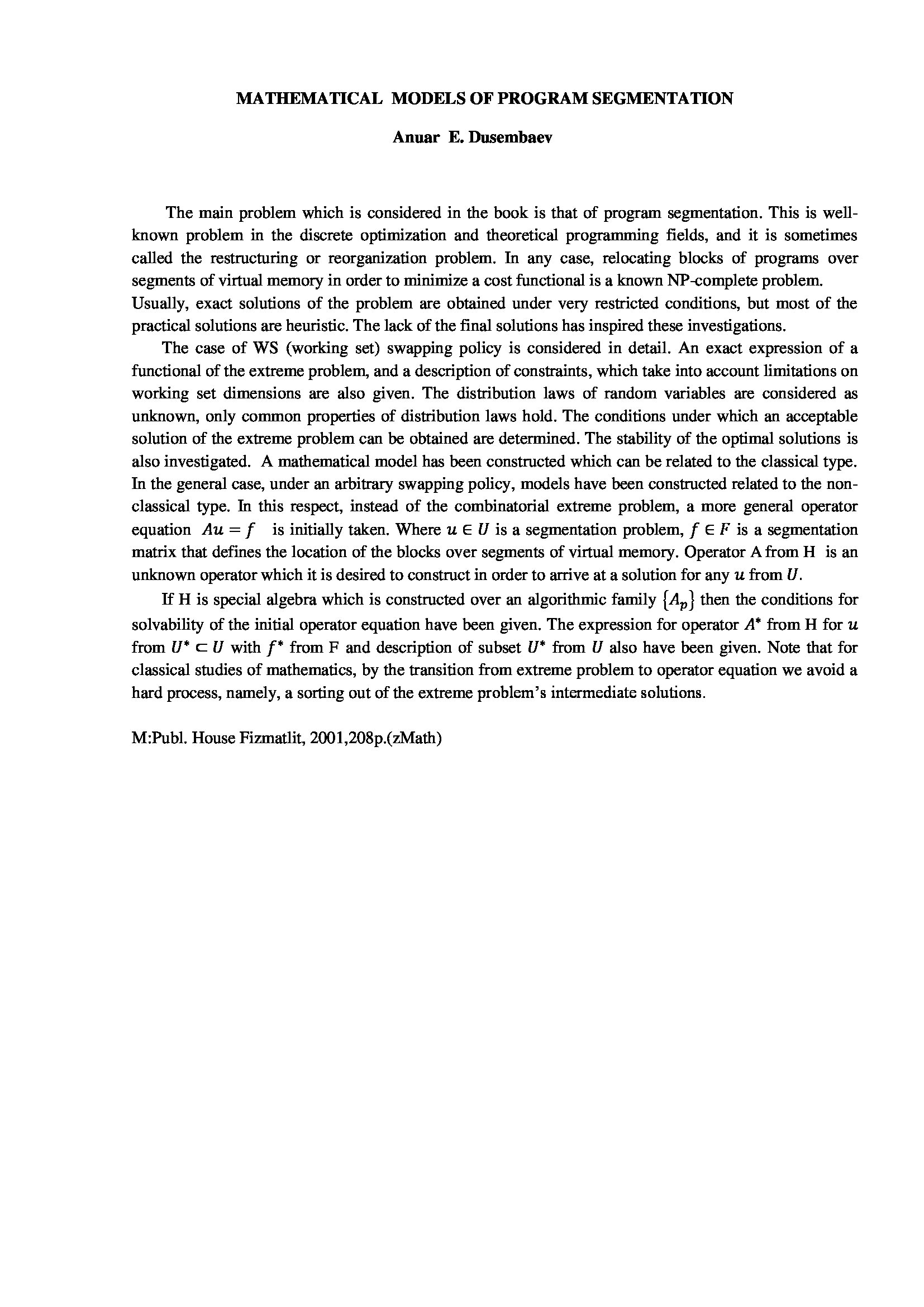
FIZ.MAT LIT 2001y

== Scientific works ==
- Zhuravlev Yu. I., Dyusembaev A.E., "Neural Network Construction for Recognition Problems with Standard Information on the Basis of a Model of Algorithms with Piecewise Linear Surfaces and Parameters"
- Dyusembaev A.E., Grishko M.V., "On Correctness Conditions for Algebra of Recognition Algorithms with μ-Operators over Pattern Problems with Binary Data"
- Dyusembaev A.E., Grishko M.V., "Construction of a Correct Algorithm and Spatial Neural Network for Recognition Problems with Binary Data"
- Dyusembaev A.E., "An approach to the solution of recognition problems using neural networks", published in Doklady Akademii Nauk, 2017, Vol. 473, No. 2, pp. 127–130.,
- Dyusembaev A.E., Kaliazhdarov D.R., "On exact solutions of recognition problems based on the neural-network approach", 2015, published in Doklady Akademii Nauk, 2015, Vol. 461, No. 3, pp. 268–271.,
- Dyusembaev, A.E., Kaliazhdarov, D., Grishko, M., "To construction of the correct algorithm for pattern recognition tasks over fuzzy neuro-operator model", 2014, iFUZZY 2014 - 2014 International Conference on Fuzzy Theory and Its Applications, Conference Digest.,
- Dyusembaev, A.E., "Mathematical models of program segmentation", FIZMATLIT. 207 p. (2001), MSC:68N01 68–02.
- Dyusembaev A.E., M. Grishko, D. Kaliazhdarov, “The Conditions of solvability of the inverse problem of the Operator Equation for a Pattern Recognition Neurooperator Model” AJIIPS, Australian Journal of Intelligent Information Processing Systems. Volume 14, No. 2, 2014, pp. 15–21.
- Dyusembaev A.E., "Operator Approach to discrete programming with application neural networks modeling", Proc.Int. Conf. ICAFS'96, Germany, Berlin, 1996, pp. 181–189.
- Dyusembaev A.E., "Mathematical models of program segmentation. (Matematicheskie modeli segmentatsii programm.)", Moskva: FIZMATLIT. 207 p. (2001).
- Dyusembaev A.E., "On one approach to the problem of segmenting programs..", Phys.-Dokl. 38, No. 4, 134-136 (1993); translation from Dokl. Akad. Nauk, Ross. Akad. Nauk 329, No. 6, 712-714 (1993).
- Dyusembaev A.E., Grishko M.V., "Conditions of the correctness for the algebra of estimates calculation algorithms with μ-operators over a set of binary-data recognition problems", M.V. Pattern Recognit. Image Anal. (2017) 27: 166.
- Dyusembaev A.E., "The synthesis of correct algorithms in the closure of recognition algorithms with representative samples and systems of supporting sets", Zh. Vychisl. Mat. Mat. Fiz., 1983, Volume 23, Number 6, Pages 1487–1496 (Mi zvmmf4483).
- Dyusembaev A.E., "On the correctness of algebraic closures of recognition algorithms of the “tests” type", USSR Computational Mathematics and Mathematical Physics, 1982, 22:6, 217–226.
- Dyusembaev A.E., Kaliazhdarov D., Grishko M., "Fuzzy operator and three dimensional neural network for pattern recognition problem", Proceedings of 2013 International Conference on Fuzzy theory and Its Application National Taiwan University of Science and Technology, Taipei, Taiwan, Dec. 6–8, 2013.
- Dyusembaev A.E., Kaliazhdarov D., Grishko M., "The Conditions of Solvability of the Inverse Problem of Operator Equation for a Pattern Recognition Neurooperator Model.", Austr. J. Intelligent Information Processing Systems 14(2) (2014).
