= Institute of Comparative Law (McGill University) =

- Established: 1965
- Director: Helge Dedek
- Location: Montreal, Quebec, Canada
- Website: www.mcgill.ca/icl

The Institute of Comparative Law was a teaching and research institute at McGill University’s Faculty of Law in Montréal, Quebec, Canada specializing in Comparative Law, Comparative Legal History and Comparative Legal Theory. Former directors include Professors Paul-André Crépeau and H. Patrick Glenn.

== History ==
Given McGill's location in the Canadian province of Québec – a mixed jurisdiction featuring both civil law and common law legal traditions – and the comparative leanings of the Faculty's early leadership, the study of Law at McGill has had an implicit comparative focus dating back to its first degree program in 1848. The formal study of Comparative Law gained prominence at McGill in the early and mid-20th century. In acknowledgment of this development, and with McGill located in a mixed jurisdiction, the Ford Foundation recognized McGill as uniquely suited for the study of comparative law, and supported the foundation of the Institute of Comparative Law – originally under the name of the Institute of Foreign and Comparative Law – through a major grant in 1965.

== Graduate education ==
Under the aegis of McGill's Faculty of Law, the Institute of Comparative Law offered both a Master's (LL.M. – both Thesis and Non-Thesis options) and a Doctor of Civil Law (D.C.L) with specializations in Comparative Law. As of 2015, of the approximately 55 master's students admitted to the Faculty of Law's LL.M. program each year, over 20% pursue their degrees with the Institute.

== American Journal of Comparative Law ==
As of January 1, 2014, the Institute of Comparative Law has been co-host of the American Journal of Comparative Law – a quarterly scholarly journal devoted to comparative law – in partnership with the Georgetown University Law Center. The Institute of Comparative Law's Director, Helge Dedek, served as its Co-Editor-in-Chief alongside James Feinerman and Franz Werro of Georgetown.
