= Anwar Zaman =

Bangladeshi politician

Member of Bangladesh Parliament
- In office 1986–1988

Personal details
- Party: Jatiya Party (Ershad)

Anwar Zaman (Bengali: আনোয়ার জামান) is a Jatiya Party (Ershad) politician and a former member of the Bangladesh Parliament from a reserved women's seat.

== Career ==
Zaman was elected to parliament from a reserved women's seat as a Jatiya Party candidate in 1986.
