= Anwar Ditta =

British activist (1953–2021)

- Born: 1953; Birmingham, West Midlands, England
- Died: 2021 (aged 67–68)
- Occupation: Anti-deportation activist

Anwar Ditta (1953–2021) was a British anti-deportation activist. She was born in Birmingham to Pakistani parents in 1953. She is best known for successfully campaigning against the Home Office to allow her children to immigrate to the UK in the late-1970s and early-1980s. She died in late-2021.
