= M. Sawkat Anwer =

American bioscientist

- Education: Kansas State University
- Scientific career
- Fields: Bioscience
- Workplaces: Tufts University

M. Sawkat Anwer is an American bioscientist. He's currently a Distinguished Professor of biomedical sciences at Tufts University. Anwar received a Masters of Science from Dhaka University and a Ph.D. from Kansas State University.
