= Nuclear law =

Nuclear law is the law related to the peaceful uses of nuclear science and technology.

Nuclear energy poses special risks to the health and safety of persons and to the environment, risks that must be carefully managed.

However, nuclear material, bombs, and technology also hold the promise of significant benefits, in a variety of fields, from medicine and agriculture to electricity production and industry. A human activity that involves only hazards and no benefits calls for a legal regime of prohibition, not regulation. Thus a basic feature of nuclear energy legislation is its dual focus on risks and benefits.

The purpose and function of nuclear law is that of all law, namely to promote and to protect; to promote the development of nuclear science and technology and to protect mankind against any hazards possibly connected therewith.

On the promotional side of the palette, many kinds of public measures are found, such as outright subsidies for nuclear research and development, tax preferences for nuclear installations and nuclear insurance, indemnity and public coverage schemes for nuclear liability, "channelling" of liability for nuclear damage and other provisions.

On the protective side, nuclear law has two distinct aspects – the protection against radiation hazards connected with the peaceful application of nuclear energy and radioactive substances, and the prevention of non-peaceful uses of nuclear energy by means of the safeguards system developed for that purpose.

== Definition ==
The International Atomic Energy Agency's Handbook on Nuclear Law gave a wide definition as "The body of special legal norms created to regulate the conduct of legal or natural persons engaged in activities related to fissionable materials, ionizing radiation and exposure to natural sources of radiation."

== Position in the wide realm of the law ==
There is, and has been right from its beginning, national law, and international law. It is national public law in its constitutional, administrative, criminal, and public health aspects. It is a national private law as it regulates liability for nuclear damage. It may, by reserving certain kinds of sources or other radioactive materials to public property, trespass by public law into what would normally be the field of private law.

It is international public law as it creates international intergovernmental organizations, and endows them with legislative powers or authority to "safeguard" the peaceful uses of nuclear materials and installations. It is international private law as it regulates civil liability for nuclear damage in various international conventions.

== History ==
One important event, which had less to do with the development of nuclear law but more with the development of international co-operation and the exchange of nuclear information, was the first International Conference on the Peaceful Uses of Atomic Energy, held in Geneva in September 1955. More than 1400 delegates attended from 73 nations and more than 1000 scientific and technical papers were presented. The effects of this conference can still be told by looking at the dates at which many national and international organizations in the field of nuclear energy were founded.

The Statute of the International Atomic Energy Agency was adopted by an International Conference in New York on 23 October 1956. In July of the same year the Council of the Organisation for European Economic Co-operation (OEEC), now OECD, had established the Steering Committee for Nuclear Energy and charged it with setting up the European Nuclear Energy Agency (ENEA). The European Atomic Energy Community (EURATOM), was founded by the Treaty of Rome of 25 March 1957, and started operation on 1 January 1958.

EURATOM (members: Belgium, France, Federal Republic of Germany, Italy, Luxembourg, Netherlands) is a supra-national organization. As such it has certain legislative powers in particular in the field of health and safety. The treaty also provides for a central supply agency, thereby creating a monopoly of all fissionable material produced in or imported to the Community.

EURATOM is owner of all such materials. Its control functions are linked to this ownership. The Treaty provided further for the establishment of so-called "Common Enterprises", which have certain obligations to the Community but also enjoy certain privileges, among them tax privileges which they could not enjoy under national law. A particular activity of the Community is the exchange of information, including even secret patents. A legal device for technical cooperation within the Community which I find of special interest is the so-called "Association Contract".

The European Nuclear Energy Agency consists of 18 Western European members and 3 associate countries (Canada, Japan, United States). It has played a considerable role in the creation of "joint undertakings". The first was the European Company for the Chemical Processing of Irradiated Fuels (EUROCHEMIC) at Mol, Belgium. EUROCHEMIC is an independent international share-holding company with its own legal personality. It was created by an international convention. Later, other international projects such as the Halden experimental boiling water reactor in Norway, the Dragon reactor project at Winfrith, United Kingdom, the Seibersdorf Food Irradiation Project in Austria, the Nuclear Data Compilation Centre at Saclay, France, and the ENEA Computer Programme Library at Ispra, Italy, were founded. One finds that a new sector of nuclear law has evolved from the range of techniques used in the formation of such joint projects and through the concepts developed in their administration and those relating to the use of information derived from their operation. ENEA has also its own safeguards system and the European Nuclear Energy Tribunal can decide disputes arising out of its application. ENEA has caused its Member States to adopt legislation by which premiums paid on nuclear insurance received a certain preferential tax treatment in order to enable insurance companies to build up reserves faster. This demonstrated how law can contribute to the promotion of nuclear economy.

The International Atomic Energy Agency (IAEA), founded in 1957, was envisaged as a means to guarantee adequate and equal supply of nuclear material to Member States and as an instrument to safeguard the peaceful uses of nuclear power. The first purpose lost importance when uranium sources turned out to be plentiful. Nevertheless, by fostering assistance projects and by developing standards for health and safety norms, the Agency contributed to the development of nuclear energy in its Member States and to the development of nuclear law.

== Evolution ==
1950s: focus on creation of international nuclear institutions IAEA 1957; NEA 1957

1960s: focus on radiation protection and civil liability IAEA basic safety standards; Paris/Vienna Conventions

1970s: focus on non-proliferation and physical protection NPT, CPPNM

1980s/1990s: Focus on safety in reaction to TMI and Chernobyl Conventions on Emergency Assistance, Early Notification, CNS, Joint Convention

2000s: Focus on security in reaction to 9/11 and other terrorist acts and moves to international harmonisation Revision of CPPNM, Convention on Nuclear Terrorism, IAEA Revised Reactor Safety Levels.

== Objectives ==
Before attempting to identify which special aspects of nuclear law distinguish it from other types of law, it is important to highlight briefly the fundamental reason why a State would decide to make the major effort necessary in order to promulgate such legislation. Simply stated, the primary objective of nuclear law is:

To provide a legal framework for conducting activities related to nuclear energy and ionizing radiation in a manner which adequately protects individuals, property and the environment. In light of this objective, it is particularly important that responsible authorities carefully assess their current nuclear energy activities and their plans for future nuclear energy development so that the legislation ultimately adopted is adequate.

== Characteristics ==
1. Safety principle (prevention, protection, and precautionary principles)
2. Security principle
3. Responsibility principle
4. Permission principle
5. Continuous control principle
6. Compensation principle
7. Sustainable development principle
8. Compliance principle
9. Independence principle
10. Transparency principle
11. International cooperation principle

== Legislative process ==
7-1. The processes of drafting national legislation establishing or revising a legal framework for the development and use of nuclear technology and the use of nuclear material are not significantly different from the process of lawmaking in any other field of national interest. Nuclear energy legislation, like any other legislation, must comply with the constitutional and institutional requirements of each State's political and legal system. However, the subject of nuclear energy is highly complex and technical, with some activities and materials posing unusual risks to human health, safety and the environment, and also national and international security risks.

The technical measures for safety, security and environmental protection in the nuclear field should take the form of:

(a) Basic principles adopted as generally applicable law and binding on all persons and organizations;
(b) Technical requirements (including regulations, guidelines and recommendations) that are not generally applicable and are made binding on specific persons or organizations by the regulatory authority or through specific licence conditions, binding only on the licence holder.

7-2. The legislative process of nuclear law has to take into account the following:

- Assessment of nuclear programmes and plans
- Assessment of laws and the regulatory framework
- Input from stakeholders
- Initial legislative drafting
- First review of the initial draft
- Further legislative consideration
- Legislative oversight
- Relationship to non-nuclear laws

== Security culture and safety culture ==
The nuclear security and safety culture, defined as: (That assembly of characteristics and attitudes in organizations and individuals which establishes that, as an overriding priority, nuclear plant safety issues receive the attention warranted by their significance)

Although nuclear law cannot itself create a nuclear safety culture, poor legal arrangements can impede the development and strengthening of a nuclear safety culture. Conversely, a strong legal framework can enhance a nuclear safety culture, for example by helping to ensure that the necessary regulatory resources are available, by facilitating transparent communications, by helping to avoid institutional conflicts and by ensuring that independent technical judgements are not blocked for extraneous reasons. During the development of national nuclear legislation, the participants in the legislative process would do well to consider carefully the issues associated with nuclear safety culture .In conclusion, it is important to recognize that legal measures for enhancing nuclear safety culture and security in a particular State must also take into account that State's national legal traditions.

== IAEA Handbook on Nuclear Law ==
The IAEA has published a Handbook on Nuclear Law which provides IAEA Member States with a new resource for assessing the adequacy of their national legal frameworks governing the peaceful uses of nuclear energy; and practical guidance for governments in efforts to enhance their laws and regulations, in harmonizing them with internationally recognized standards, and in meeting their obligations under relevant international instruments.

The Handbook responds to the growing demand from many national governments for assistance in the development of nuclear legislation and the need to harmonize their own legal and institutional arrangements with international standards. It also presents concise and authoritative instructional materials for teaching professionals (lawyers, scientists, engineers, health and radiation protection workers, government administrators) on the basic elements of a sound framework for managing and regulating nuclear energy.

The Handbook is organized into five general parts:

Part I provides a general overview of key concepts in the field: nuclear energy law and the legislative process; the regulatory authority; and the fundamental regulatory activities of licensing, inspection and enforcement.

Part II deals with radiation protection.

Part III covers various subjects arising from nuclear and radiation safety: radiation sources, nuclear installations, emergency preparedness and response, mining and milling, transportation, and waste and spent fuel.

Part IV addresses the topic of nuclear liability and coverage.

Part V moves to non-proliferation and security related subjects: safeguards, export and import controls, and physical protection. The Handbook also reflects and refers to the extensive range of IAEA Safety Standards covering all fields relevant to peaceful nuclear technology.

The authors of the Handbook are: Carlton Stoiber, a lawyer with over thirty years’ experience in the U.S. government in nuclear non-proliferation, safety and security;

Alec Baer, professor of science and engineering at the University of Ottawa and former Chairman of the Board of Governors and the International Nuclear Safety Advisory Group (INSAG);

Norbert Pelzer, professor of nuclear law at the University of Göttingen and a recognized expert in nuclear liability;

Wolfram Tonhauser, coordinator of the IAEA's Nuclear Legislative Assistance activities.

For more information about IAEA publications, visit the Agency's web site at www.iaea.org.
