= Anwar Pasha Turki =

Pakistani boxer (1926–2004)

Personal information
- Nationality: Pakistani
- Born: 8 August 1926
- Died: 22 February 2004 (aged 77)

Sport
- Sport: Boxing

Anwar Pasha Turki (8 August 1926 – 22 February 2004) was a Pakistani boxer. He competed at the 1948 Summer Olympics and the 1952 Summer Olympics.
