= Anwar Al-Hamadani =

Iraqi television presenter

Anwar al-Hamadani (Arabic: أنور الحمداني; born April 2, 1974, Baghdad) is an Iraqi television presenter for the Al-Baghdadia TV. He received an arrest warrant after one of the guests on Hamdani's show, was very critical of Nouri al-Maliki, calling him "corrupt" and "sectarian."
