= Anwar Hussain =

Anwar Hussain may refer to:

== People ==
- Anwar Hussain (actor) (1925–1988), Indian actor and producer
- Anwar Hussain (cricketer) (1920–2002), Pakistani cricketer
- Anwar Hussain (general), Bangladeshi Army general
- Anwar Hussain (politician) (born 1947), Indian politician
- Anwar Hussein (photographer) (1938–2024), British photographer and author

== See also ==
- Anwar Hossain (disambiguation)
