= Anwar Shah Shopiani =

Kashmiri Islamic preacher, poet

Shaykh Shaykh Anwar Shah Shopiyani
- Title: Shaykh

Personal life
- Born: Mohammad Anwar Shah c. 1849 Shopian, Princely State of Kashmir and Jammu, India
- Died: c. 1939 (aged 88–89) Shopian, Kashmir
- Cause of death: Natural
- Resting place: 33°42′45″N 74°49′37″E
- Home town: Shopian
- Partner: Molvi Syed Hussain Shah
- Children: Molvi Abdul Gani Shopiani, Molvi Abdul Rasheed Shopiani and Molvi Abdul Hamid (sons), Abdul Qayoom Shopiani Shopiani, Molvi Mohammad Bashir Shopiani and Molvi Abdul Hakeem Shopiani (grandsons)
- Main interest(s): Hadith, poetry, Islamic preaching
- Education: Local Madrasa-based Islamic education
- Known for: Propagation of Islam

Religious life
- Religion: Islam
- Denomination: Salafi
- Founder of: Ahl-i Hadith movement
- Philosophy: Quran and Sunnah
- School: Salafism
- Lineage: Rasool Shah
- Creed: Athari

Muslim leader
- Teacher: Molana Abdul Mannan Muhaddis Wazirabadi
- Students: Haji Ahmadullah Shahdad and Haji Abdul Gaffar Wani Qarrah
- Influenced by: Ibn Taymiyya, Muhammad ibn Abd al-Wahhab
- Influenced: Entirety of the Salafi Movement in Kashmir.

Anwar Shah Shopiani (born Mohammad Anwar Shah; c. 1849 – c. 1939), also known by the honorary title Mawlawi Anwar Shah Shopiani, was a Kashmiri Islamic preacher, scholar and poet. He was the founder of Ahl-i Hadith movement in Jammu and Kashmir, and is also credited for establishing the Ahl Al-Hadith Masjid at Zaldagar, the first Ahl-i Hadith mosque of the Kashmir Valley built in 1897. He also served as Imam at Jamiat-e-Ahle Hadith, J&K in Zaldagar, Srinagar.

He wrote Islamic poetry in Persian and Kashmiri languages such as Taleem Sunnat, Basharatul Mumineen, and later publications include Dewan Anwar and Guldasta Anwari, a Kashmiri poetic collection.

== Biography ==
He was born in the Shopian district of Jammu and Kashmir. He received his basic islamic education outside the state, and is believed to be the student of Hafiz Abdul Manan Wazirabadi, a leading Muslim scholar of that time.

=== Lectures and debates ===
After completing his education, he returned to the valley and travelled across the multiple regions, including Kishtwar and Turtuk, Nobra and Ladakh to propagate puritan form of Islam.

== Criticism and controversy ==
He was criticised by the religious leaders for propagating his views towards the leaders after claiming "mullas are misleading people". He had several cases filed against him, and was subsequently charged under blasphemy law for insulting the shrines revered by the Kashmiris and the practices of the Sunni Muslims. He was later released.

== First period (1857–1890) ==
Jammu & Kashmir was ruled by Maharaja Ranbir Singh who succeeded his father Maharaja Gulab Singh in 1857 AD. The Wahabi movement began to influence the valley during his rule but he kept a strict vigil on the activities of puritans as mentioned by Sir Walter Lawrence in his famous book, "The Valley of Kashmir". It shows that Maharja was worried about the move of puritans and strongly curbed their activities by jailing the activists from time to time.

Since India was influenced by the mutiny of 1857, the ruler Maharaja Ranbhir Singh tried to save his kingdom from any outer disturbance. During this period Anwar visited Punjab in quest of further studies which was a turning point in the life of Anwar after meeting the Islamic scholars of Bengal including Molana Yaqoub of Dinajpur (now in Bangladesh) who was an admirer of Shah Ismail Shaheed Dehelvi who guided and trained him. After returning from Punjab, Molana Anwar began to preach a puritanical form of Islam, which raised the ire of the locals due to his opposition of reverence at graves and shrines, which he derided as "worship": asthana wa qabar parasti. Several attempts were made by his opponents to kill him, without success. Akhtar Mohiuddin, a literary figure of Kashmir, mentioned him in the book entitled, "Indian Literature" published by Sahitya Academy Delhi as under:

A significant poet preacher of the period is Molvi Anwar Shah of Shopian. He belonged to the wahabi sect of muslims. His poetry is therefore, devoted to the subjects relating to religion and more especially to his creed. While he versified hadith and muslim code of social conduct he denounced the grave worship and forms of superstition. He exhorted the people to rise above the world of petty gains and fear none but Allah. He wrote better satires against outmoded customs. His target were mullahs who he thought preached superstition instead of true religion

== Second period (1890–1939) ==
During this period Molana Anwar gained some level of support for his movement, and in 1912 the first Ahle-hadith (Salafi) mosque was built at Zaldagar Srinagar. During this period Molana Anwar visited Qadiyan city of Punjab and met Mirza Ghulam Ahmad Qadiyani, the founder of Ahmadiyya Movement, and opposed his claim of being a Prophet or Maseehe Mauoud. After returning from Qadiyan, Molana Anwar started his mission against the "Qadiyanis" (as the Ahmadiyya were called derogatorily).

Molana Mohammad Sayeed Masudi has acknowledged the services of Molana Mohammad Anwar in the following words: "Had Molana Anwar not been active in Kashmir the southern part of valley would have professed Qadiyani faith. It was his spirit and endevour which blocked the activities of Qadiyanis".

Anwar was several times jailed on the allegations that he had spread hatred among the Muslim sects and preached against the Muslim clergymen who he alleged encourage innovations and superstitions in Islam.

== Works ==
- Dewan-e-Anwar (A collection of poems in the form of anthology according to Arabic alphabetical order) published in 1935 in Lahore.
- Taleem-e-Sunnat (The only versified book in Kashmiri language which provides you the way of life in the light of Hadith. This book became so popular that it runs in 13th edition of printing till now since 1943 AD).
- Guldaste-Anwari (This book consists of Kashmiri and Persian poems related to the praises of God and Muhammed published first in 1928 at Mohammadi Steam Press Lahore.
- Tafseer-e-Surah Yousuf (A versified translation of Chapter 12 of Holy Qur'an.
- Basharatul Mumineen (A befitting poetic replica to a local poet of Shopian who criticized the Salafis in the form of satire) first published in 1937 or 1942.
- Usool-e-Hadith (Versified account of Hadith. This book has been published for the first time in 1936.
- Naseehat-un-Niswaan (Two parts) Marriage songs in the form of Wanvun published for the first time in 1938).
- Salam-e-Anwar Mae Kalam-e-Anwar ( A collection of eulogies of the Islamic prophet Muhammad) first published in 1938.
- Jang-e-Badr (A versified account of battle of Badr in Kashmiri Language published first in 1970)
- Jang-e-Uhad (A versified account of battle of Uhad in Kashmiri Language published first in 1970)
- Al Qawlul Maqbool fi Meraj-U-Rasool (A versified account of divine visit of Mohammad to heavens first published in 1942AD).
- Sheikh San’an (An account of pious person Sheikh San’an still unpublished but original manuscript found and preserved)
- Haleema bar wazne Karima (A Persian collection of poems in the style of Sheik Sadi's book Karima first composed in 1901AD).
- Nehrul Irfan (A poetic collection in Persian in the praise of La-ilaaha-illAllah still unpublished).
- Virdul Muwahideen (A book written in a style of Virdul Murudeen)
