= South Asian Strategic Stability Institute University =

Pakistani research institute and think tank

- Abbreviation: SASSI University
- Headquarters: Orchard Scheme, Islamabad, 44000, Pakistan
- Website: https://sassi.org.pk/

The South Asian Strategic Stability Institute University, in short SASSI University, is a research institute and a think tank located in Islamabad. It was founded with the premise of promoting peace and stability in South Asia. The institute is focused on promoting peace in South Asia particularly Pakistan-India relations.

The South Asian Strategic Stability Institute was previously a research department within the Department of Peace Studies at the University of Bradford. The South Asian Strategic Stability Unit (SASSU) was established in February 2004 as a specialist research Unit within the Bradford Disarmament Research Centre with a grant from Pakistan's National University of Science and Technology.

In February 2004, the decision was made to take SASSU out of the academic environment and convert it into an "independent entity". Former Deputy Director Maria Sultan took over as Director-General and Nick Robson as Chief Coordinator. Sultan has been affiliated with the Government of Pakistan, specifically serving as a civilian defence strategist at the Ministry of Defence.

SASSI has been headquartered in the Aldgate district of London since 2004. In 2008, SASSI opened a subsidiary office in Islamabad, Pakistan.

In 2015, a Sassi University was launched in Islamabad. At this university, courses on the national security, peace studies, media sciences, counter-terrorism were planned to be offered. Maria Sultan, chairperson of the university stated that the university would be an institute of higher learning that provides the nation, through knowledge, a response capability to deal with growing challenges around the world.
