= Anouar Zeroual =

Italian footballer (born 1996)

Personal information
- Full name: Anouar Zeroual
- Date of birth: 17 July 1996 (age 30)
- Place of birth: Empoli, Italy
- Height: 1.70 m (5 ft 7 in)
- Positions: Right back; midfielder

Team information
- Current team: Marlow

Senior career*
Years	Team	Apps	(Gls)
2014–2015	Real Cerretese	21	(3)
2015–2017	Jolly & Montemurlo	16	(1)
2018	Amersham Town	31	(0)
2019–2021	Metropolitan Police	14	(4)
2021	Beaconsfield Town	11	(0)
2021–2022	Holmer Green	9	(2)
2022–2023	Blyth Spartans	4	(0)
2023–	Marlow	19	(1)
- * Club domestic league appearances and goals as of 23 September 2023

Anouar Zeroual (born 17 July 1996) is an Italian footballer who plays as a defender or midfielder for Marlow F.C.

== Career ==
=== Early career ===
Born in Empoli, a small town close to Florence in Italy to Moroccan parents, he started to kick the ball at the age of 5 with Vinci ASD, the local club of Leonardo da Vinci’s birth town.

Anouar was one of the best players within Vinci ASD and at the age of 10 joined Empoli FC after a successful trial. He was always compared to Gattuso for his defensive skills and his ‘grinta’. At the age of 16 played for Real Cerretese and in 2015 he joined Jolly & Montemurlo competing in Serie D.

=== England Non-League ===
Anouar moved to England in 2016 and played for Metropolitan Police F.C., Beaconsfield Town F.C, Holmer Green F.C. and Blyth Spartans A.F.C.

On summer 2023 Anouar joined Marlow F.C members of the Isthmian League South.
