= Anwar Hossein-Panahi =

Anwar Hossein-Panahi (Persian: انور حسین‌پناهی) is an Iranian Kurdish teacher and political activist. He was arrested on November 5, 2007, and sentenced to death by an Islamic Revolutionary Court in July 2008 on charges of acting against national security and being an enemy of God, but his sentence was later reduced to six years in prison in March 2009. He was imprisoned in Sanandaj prison before being released on bail on August 13, 2013, three months before the end of his sentence. On June 27, 2017, Anwar was arrested and transferred to Tehran where he was held for two days before being released on the condition that he not return to the Kordestan province.

== Personal life ==
Anwar has one son, Milad (born 1999), and two daughters, Mahtab (born 1996), and Mahshid (born 2005). He also has two brothers; Zibar, and Ahmad.

In the years since his release, he has campaigned for the freedom of his brother, Ramin.

Prior to 2007 he was a primary school teacher.
