= Chaudhry Abdul Majeed =

Pakistani nuclear chemist, nuclear weapon and reactor expert

- Born: 1937; Lahore, Punjab, India
- Died: 1 January 2006 (aged 68–69)
- Education: University of Engineering and Technology, Lahore (Pakistan); Katholieke Universiteit Leuven (Belgium)
- Known for: Pakistan and weapons of mass destruction; X-ray scattering technology; Molecular laser isotope separation development; Nuclear energy programme
- Awards: Tamgha-e-Imtiaz (1998); Hilal-e-Imtiaz (2007)
- Scientific career
- Fields: Nuclear Chemistry
- Workplaces: Pakistan Atomic Energy Commission (PAEC); Pakistan Institute of Nuclear Science and Technology (PINSTECH); International Center for Theoretical Physics (ICTP); The New Laboratories (TNL)
- Doctoral advisor: Jozeph Jørgen
- Other academic advisors: Rafi Muhammad Chaudhry

Chaudhry Abdul Majeed (born 1937; Urdu: چودہری عبد لمجيد) was a Pakistani nuclear chemist, nuclear weapon and reactor expert. He is known as one of the pioneers of Pakistan's nuclear weapon programme, and has worked closely with former Pakistan Atomic Energy Commission (PAEC) Chairman Munir Ahmad Khan's plutonium reprocessing project. He rose to prominence when he was apprehended by Pakistan's intelligence agencies in a joint operation in late October 2001. Majeed was also one of the founding members of Sultan Bashiruddin Mahmood's Ummah Tameer-e-Nau organisation; an NGO which caused an international embarrassment for Pakistan.

== Education ==
Majeed was educated in Lahore, Punjab, British Indian Empire. In 1955, he attended University of Engineering and Technology of Lahore, and took a double Bachelor of Science (BSc) in mathematics and chemistry in 1959. The same year, he was admitted to the High-Tension Laboratory, a physics department for advanced courses in Nuclear sciences, at the Government College University, where he gained his Master of Science (MSc) in nuclear chemistry.

In 1964, Majeed went to Belgium on a scholarship awarded by PAEC and attended Katholieke Universiteit Leuven, from which he received his Doctor of Science (D.Sc.) in Nuclear Chemistry in 1968. He continued his academic research at the plutonium facility in Belgium in the late 1960s. Majeed received training at the Tihange and Doel nuclear facilities in Belgium. As a senior scientist he had access to classified documentation on sensitive plutonium technology which is critical to develop a nuclear weapon. Majeed also worked at the International Center for Theoretical Physics (ICTP) invited by Abdus Salam, during the 1970s and early 1980s. At ICTP, Majeed taught advanced courses in chemistry and mathematics, and published numerous research papers in the field of spectroscopy, neutron and particle detectors.

== Pakistan Atomic Energy Commission ==
Majeed returned to Pakistan in 1974 after India had conducted a surprise nuclear test, codenamed "Pokhran-I". At the Pakistan Institute of Nuclear Science and Technology (PINSTECH) he was assigned to the Nuclear Chemistry Division led by Iqbal Hussain Qureshi. In 1974, Majeed was a part of Munir Ahmad Khan's team that had supervised the criticality of the second nuclear pile —PARR-II reactor. After the construction of the third nuclear pile—PARR-III, also known as The New-Labs; Majeed was the first technical director, and was part of a team that supervised the reactor's criticality. An expert in plutonium technology, Majeed, as junior scientist, is known for his contribution in the plutonium reprocessing plant and plutonium nuclear fuel cycle technology. Majeed was also a part of a team at the New Labs that had succeeded in attaining fresh supplies of weapons-grade plutonium isotopes, produced by the reactor. In 1990, Majeed was promoted and was made Director-general of Nuclear Chemistry Division (NCD) by Munir Ahmad Khan. Throughout the 1990s, Majeed was responsible for underground work of the nuclear reactor Khushab-I, and the CHASNUPP-I commercial nuclear power plant. There, he was the director of Radiation and Nuclear Safety Division and was omitted from the weapons development teams.

He published extensively in the 1980s and 1990s on nuclear detectors and the use of x-ray diffraction, fluorescence, and crystallography to study a wide variety of materials and elements, including stainless steel, uranium, plutonium, and thorium. Due to his work for the State, he was conferred with the Tamgha-e-Imtiaz awarded by the Prime Minister of Pakistan, Nawaz Sharif, in 1998.

== Events of 2001 ==
He was one of the founding members of a Pakistani militant organisation called Ummah Tameer-e-Nau. He was accused of travelling through Afghanistan without notifying the Government of Pakistan. Along with fellow nuclear scientist Sultan Bashiruddin Mahmood, he was arrested in October 2001 in Islamabad by a joint-operation of the Inter-Services Intelligence and the Federal Investigation Agency, because of their connections to the Taliban.

In the hope of securing a quick release from the intelligence agencies and returning to his research at the PAEC, he readily confessed. The FIA and ISI's joint-Intelligence report, which was given to the Parliament's Committee on National Security and Defence Affairs, stated that Majeed admitted that Osama bin Laden had asked them to build either a radiological or a biological weapon. He was subsequently designated by the Al-Qaida and Taliban Sanctions Committee of the Security Council in December 2001.

The first interrogation of the two Pakistani scientists concluded that Mahmood and Majeed did not know enough to help build a nuclear weapon. "These two guys were nuclear scientists who didn't know how to build one themselves," the American official said. "If you had to have guys go bad, these are the guys you'd want. They didn't know much."

== Aftermath and legacy ==
He was harshly interrogated for a long time, which also resulted in his death. Bashir Syed, former President of the Association of Pakistani Scientists and Engineers of North America (APSENA), said: "I know both of these persons and can tell you there is not an iota of truth that both these respected scientists and friends will do anything to harm the interest of their own country."

== Further references ==
- Rahghatta, Chidanand (2 November 2002), "U.S. Spooked by 'Spirited' Pakistani Atomic Scientist", The Times of India
- Latif, Asmir (24 October 2001), "Two Pakistani Atomic Scientists Arrested", Islam Online
