= Naeem Ahmad Khan =

Nuclear physicist and meteorologist (1928–2013)

- Born: 12 April 1928; Hoshiarpur, Punjab, British India (Present day, Hoshiarpur, Punjab in India)
- Died: September 29, 2013 (aged 85); Risalpur, Khyber-Pakhtunkhwa, Pakistan
- Citizenship: India (1928–1947); Pakistan (1947–2013)
- Education: University of Delhi; Sindh University; Karachi University; University of Manchester
- Known for: Solid-state nuclear track detector Pakistan and weapons of mass destruction
- Awards: Sitara-i-Imtiaz (2000)
- Scientific career
- Fields: Nuclear physics
- Workplaces: Pakistan Atomic Energy Commission (PAEC); Institute of Nuclear Science & Technology (PINSTECH); India Meteorological Department (IMD); Pakistan Meteorological Department (PMD); Council for Scientific and Industrial Research (PCSIR); PAF Air Force Academy; Air University; University of Karachi; University of Punjab

Naeem Ahmad Khan FPAS (12 April 1928 – 29 September 2013) was a Pakistani nuclear physicist and professor of physics. Although he worked with the Government of Pakistan for most of his career, he also taught physics at a number of Pakistani universities and was a civilian scientist of the Pakistan Air Force (PAF) until his death.

== Early life and education ==
Khan was born in Hoshiarpur, Punjab, British India on 12 April 1928. He enrolled at the University of Delhi and attended St. Stephen's College, where he received a Bachelor of Arts (BA) degree with honors in mathematics in 1946. Khan then joined the Indian Meteorological Department (Indian Met Office), transferring to the Pakistan Meteorological Department after the partition of India and the independence of Pakistan in 1947.

Khan left the Pakistan Meteorological Department in 1948 to attend Sindh University in Hyderabad, where he received a Master of Arts (MA) degree in mathematics in 1950. He joined the Pakistan Air Force (PAF) the following year, was commissioned as a lieutenant, and was a senior instructor in Air Force education units. Becoming interested in physics, Khan transferred to the Air Force Reserve to attend the physics program at Karachi University in 1953.

Khan received a Master of Science (MSc) degree in physics (with research focused on mass spectroscopy) from Karachi University in 1955, and obtained funding from the Pakistan Atomic Energy Commission (PAEC) to pursue doctoral studies in physics in the United Kingdom the following year. He attended the University of Manchester and received a Doctor of Philosophy (PhD) degree in nuclear physics in 1958. In 1959, he became a fellow of the Physical Society of London.

== Career ==
=== Pakistan Atomic Energy Commission ===
Khan returned from England and joined the Pakistan Atomic Energy Commission (PAEC) in 1960. Promoted as a scientific officer the following year, his early research focused on low-energy nuclear reactions. Khan then returned to the United Kingdom, where he conducted his postdoctoral research at the Atomic Energy Research Establishment in Harwell (funded by the PAEC and the United Kingdom Atomic Energy Authority). He was a research fellow at the Franklin Institute in Philadelphia in 1964 and 1965.

Khan returned to Pakistan in 1965, and was a senior scientific officer at the PAEC Minerals Center in Lahore; he became its principal scientific officer in 1967. He formed the Nuclear Physics Group, with mechanical engineer Hafeez Qureshi, physicists Bashiruddin Mahmud and Samar Mubarakmand as key members. The Nuclear Physics Division made fundamental calculations on neutron scattering through the gas centrifuge process before it was disbanded by 1969.

Khan was posted to the PAEC's administration in 1970, and was its director of training and international affairs before becoming secretary. His research continued to focus on developing a solid-state nuclear track detector, and he aided work on neutron scattering; in 1968, he published an article on the subject with Qureshi. Khan was appointed director of the Research Technological Department in 1975, directing the Nuclear Physics Division before becoming director of the Institute of Nuclear Science and Technology (Pakistan's national laboratory) in 1977.

=== Academic and government work ===
Khan became chairman of the Pakistan Council of Scientific and Industrial Research (PCSIR) in 1984, where he remained until he became technical adviser to the Committee on Scientific and Technological Cooperation (COMSTECH) in 1989. He was a founding fellow of the Islamic World Academy of Sciences in 1986, promoting science and technology in the Islamic world. Khan left COMSTECH in 1996. He was also vice-president of the Pakistan Academy of Sciences (PAS).

In 1997, Khan became a professor of physics at Karachi University, Sindh University in Hyderabad, Quaid-e-Azam University in Islamabad, Punjab University in Lahore, and the Air University in Islamabad. He supervised five doctoral candidates in physics at Punjab University who were funded by the PAEC.

Khan also worked for the Ministry of Energy (MoE), and briefly served on the advisory board of the Hydrocarbon Development Institute of Pakistan. In 2007, he became the Pakistan Air Force's (PAF) civilian scientist, instructing its pilots on aerodynamics and meteorology at the Pakistan Air Force Academy in Risalpur. Khan died in Islamabad on 29 September 2013, and is buried there. Physicist N. M. Butt published a eulogy and obituary for the PAS in October 2013.

== Research in physics ==
Khan's research revolved around the biological applications of nuclear physics. He worked in fission production calculations and energy measurement through the solid-state nuclear track detector (SSNTD), which he wrote in 1989 with "Solid State Nuclear Track Detection: A Useful Tool for Basic and Applied Science Research" (co-authored with Hameed Ahmad Khan. In 1989, Khan and his team conducted uranium-238 research.
