= Ahmed Sharif (disambiguation) =

Ahmed Sharif (1921–1999) was a Bangladeshi atheist philosopher, critic, and writer.

Ahmed Sharif may also refer to:

- Iftekhar, full name Iftekhar Ahmed Sharif, (1920–1995), Indian actor
- Ahmed Sharif (Bangladeshi actor)
- Ahmed Sharif (Maldivian actor) (born 1991)
- Ahmed Sharif Chaudhry, Pakistan Army general
