= Ummah Tameer-e-Nau =

Militant organization

Ummah Tameer-e-Nau (UTN), is a militant organization banned by the United States Department of Treasury on December 20, 2001. It was also placed on the Patriot Act Terrorist Exclusion List. It is suspected of supplying information about constructing nuclear weapons to Osama bin Laden and Al-Qaeda.

== Origin ==
The UTN was founded in June 2000 by Pakistani scientist Sultan Bashiruddin Mahmood, who notably resigned from the Pakistan Atomic Energy Commission (PAEC) in 1999 in protest of the Pakistani government's willingness to sign the Comprehensive Test Ban Treaty (CTBT). He had previously served as Director for Nuclear Power and was the chief designer and director of the Khushab Reactor-I. On popular Pakistani news channels, Mahmood was a vehement supporter of the Afghan Taliban, and once described the Taliban's regime in Afghanistan as the "ideal Islamic state". In a report published by The New York Times, his fellow scientists and engineers at PAEC began to question his mental state, and wonder seriously if Mahmood was mentally sound."

In March 1999, he was awarded with Pakistan's third highest civilian honour, the Sitara-i-Imtiaz, by the President of Pakistan.

== Membership ==
- Lieutenant-General (retired) Hamid Gul former director of Pakistan's Inter-Services Intelligence was also a member and has acknowledged this. Other prominent Pakistani scientists, retired military officers, and industrialists were also members of UTN:
- Dr. Chaudhry Abdul Majeed, a former senior scientist at the PAEC and ICTP.
- Mirza Yousaf Baig, nuclear chemist, a senior scientist and the owner of a construction company.
- Admiral (retired) Humayan Niaz, an electrical engineer and a retired Pakistan Navy Admiral in the electrical engineering division of Pakistan Navy.
- S.M. Tufail, an industrial engineer
- Commodore (retired) Arshad Chaudhry (Naval Engineer)
- Mohammed Hanif (an Industrialist and a civil engineer).

== Activities ==
The stated purpose of UTN was to rebuild Afghanistan's infrastructure and raise money to develop the Taliban-held areas of Afghanistan. UTN reportedly had the personal support of jihadist Mohammed Omar and close ties to the Taliban regime. The U.S. declared Ummah Tameer-e-Nau a terrorist group after a search of the group's offices in Kabul unearthed documents referencing plans to kidnap a U.S. diplomat and outlining basic physics related to nuclear weapons. Documents also showed that there was a plan to mine uranium inside Afghanistan.

== Sanctions ==
Consequent to the US actions Pakistan froze the assets of UTN. The Bank of England also ordered a freeze on its assets. It was also sanctioned by the United Nations. Bashiruddin Mahmood and Dr. Chaudhry Abdul Majeed were arrested in Pakistan in November, 2001. However Pakistan refused to extradite him to the United States. He was subsequently freed in February 2002. Hamid Gul, former chief of Pakistan's Inter-Services Intelligence agency, has been placed on a global watchlist of terrorists by the U.S. government. The sanctioned Al-Qaeda affiliate Al Rashid Trust, also provided funds for UTN.
