= Richard Barlow (intelligence analyst) =

American intelligence analyst

Richard Barlow is an American intelligence analyst and a former expert in nuclear non-proliferation for the US Arms Control and Disarmament Agency, the Central Intelligence Agency, and the Department of Defense. He lost his job and was subjected to a campaign of persecution and intimidation after he expressed concern to his managers in the US Department of Defense over testimony to the United States Congress that he believed to be false about Pakistan's nuclear weapon program during the presidency of George H. W. Bush. Since then, he has had occasional contract work for various federal agencies including the CIA, the State Department, the FBI and Sandia National Laboratories. In 2013 he had been unemployed since 2004 when his job at Sandia had been eliminated. "If they had busted those [Pakistani] networks," he told journalist Jeff Stein, "Iran would have no nuclear program, North Korea wouldn't have a uranium bomb, and Pakistan wouldn't have over a hundred nuclear weapons they are driving around in vans to hide from us."

== College and early career ==
In 1980 Barlow wrote a political science honors thesis as a senior at Western Washington University in Bellingham discussing US failures in attempting to stop Pakistan from acquiring nuclear weapons. After a stint with the State Department's Arms Control and Disarmament Agency (ACDA), he got a job in 1985 with the Central Intelligence Agency (CIA). At the CIA he collated and examined information about nuclear programs in the Third World and contributed to the National Intelligence Estimates.

In 1985, the US Congress passed the Solarz and Pressler Amendments to the Foreign Assistance Act, named after then-Representative Stephen J. Solarz, Democrat of New York, and then-Senator Larry Pressler, Republican of North Dakota. These amendments required that all military and economic aid be cut off for any non-nuclear nations that illegally exported or attempted to export nuclear-related materials from the United States. Such exports violated the United Nations Treaty on the Non-Proliferation of Nuclear Weapons (Non-Proliferation Treaty or NPT), but without those amendments, there were no penalties for violations.

Barlow's early work included an effort to sound the alarm about procurement activities in the US directed by Abdul Qadeer Khan, who had "acquired" nuclear blueprints from a Dutch employer in 1975 and used those to get a job as head of Pakistan's nuclear program. The CIA had known about Khan's activities from the beginning. Barlow reportedly discovered that Pakistan's nuclear program depended upon clandestine and illegal procurement activity within the US.

In mid-1986 Barlow became the CIA's delegate to the Nuclear Export Violations Working Group (N.E.V.W.G.), a newly formed top-secret panel that brought together the policy, law-enforcement, and intelligence communities in an effort to stop illegal American exports to non-nuclear nations. After a few failed sting operations, Barlow became convinced that the officials in the State Department were warning targets of sealed arrest warrants in FBI operations and illegally approving export licenses for restricted goods. Barlow and others in the working group stopped sharing their plans with the State Department.

In July 1987, the FBI arrested Arshad Z. Pervez, a Pakistani-born Canadian, as he attempted to buy twenty-five tons of a specially strengthened steel, for which the primary use would be a uranium enrichment program, according to Barlow. This arrest was highly publicized and attracted the attention of the Asian and Pacific Affairs Subcommittee, chaired by Representative Solarz. Retired Army Major General David W. Einsel, then working for the CIA, and Barlow were asked to testify before that committee in a classified briefing. Einsel gave evasive answers when asked if Pakistan had attempted to purchase anything that would have been a violation of the Solarz amendment, either directly or via a third party in a different country. Solarz then asked essentially the same question of Barlow, who replied that the CIA knew of "scores" of Pakistani attempts to violate American export law.

Barlow said that after that testimony, he was so harassed by Einsel and other senior CIA personnel that he resigned in 1988, though not before receiving the CIA's Exceptional Accomplishment Award.

In 1989 he was hired as a proliferation analyst for the Department of Defense. He was in a chain of command below Stephen J. Hadley, then Assistant Secretary of Defense for Global Strategic Affairs, who reported to the Under-Secretary of Defense for Policy when Dick Cheney was the Secretary of Defense.

During the debate over the sale of F-16s to Pakistan in 1989, the U.S. administration was constrained by the 1985 Pressler amendment of the Foreign Assistance Act which prohibited the sale of any matériel or armaments which might assist in the development or delivery of nuclear weapons. Barlow's analysis of Pakistan's nuclear program indicated that Pakistan possessed the capability to use the fighters to drop nuclear bombs, and the report which he submitted to Dick Cheney concluded that the F-16 sale indisputably violated the NPT and the Solarz and Pressler Amendments. He drew on details available to the intelligence community about how Pakistan had used the F-16s it already possessed.

He then learned that Deputy Assistant Secretary of Defense Arthur Hughes had given testimony before Congress that stated the exact opposite, including that using F-16s to deliver nuclear weapons "far exceeded the state of art in Pakistan." Barlow knew this was not true. He checked the files and found that his reports had been "mysteriously substituted or altered" and "willfully falsified by officials at the Office of the Secretary of Defense", including then-Undersecretary of Defense for Policy Paul Wolfowitz and then-Deputy Undersecretary of Defense Scooter Libby. Barlow then told his superiors that congress had been misled and urged that the record be corrected. Within days, Barlow was fired.

== Events following dismissal ==
Barlow is not a whistleblower in the traditional sense, because he did not release classified information to the public. Instead, he lawfully disclosed in a classified briefing to a committee of the US Congress information that his management did not want shared with Congress. Because of his lawful and protected disclosures, he was fired for asking his managers to correct the record when blatantly false statements had been made to Congress.

This information became public as a result of a legal action that Barlow filed for wrongful termination. That suit received considerable attention, including from the United States Congress. In this he was defended by Paul Wolfowitz who said "there have been times on that issue when I specifically sensed that people thought we could somehow construct a policy on a house of cards that the Congress wouldn't know what the Pakistanis were doing". He concluded that the retaliation Barlow had faced was "wrong".

Following congressionally ordered investigations, the inspector general at the State Department concluded that Barlow had been fired as a reprisal. However, the inspectors general at the CIA and the Defense Department stated that the Pentagon was within its rights to fire Barlow. A final investigation by Congress' own Government Accountability Office was completed in 1997 and "largely vindicated" Barlow, who had his security clearance restored. During the investigation, the State department inspector-general, Sherman Funk, described Barlow as "one of the most brilliant analysts I've ever seen".

His security clearances were restored, but he was unable to get rehired permanently by the government, presumably because of the cloud over his record. He subsequently found occasional jobs as a contractor for federal agencies including the CIA, the State Department, the FBI and Sandia National Laboratories. However, in 2013 he had been unemployed since his last job at Sandia had been eliminated in 2004, and he was living in a motor home.

The activities of the Defense Department officials, however, including Cheney, Libby, Wolfowitz and Hadley, were never investigated. Rep. Stephen Solarz, a major player in counter-proliferation, told Seymour Hersh for the latter's famous exposé of the Pakistani nuclear program that "If what Barlow says is true, this would have been a major scandal of Iran-Contra proportions, and the officials involved would have had to resign. We're not dealing with minor matters. Stopping the spread of nuclear weapons is one of the major foreign-policy issues of the nation—not to mention the law of the land."

Barlow, however, was unable to find employment after his clearance was removed and marriage broke up. "They viciously tried to destroy my life, personally and professionally" he is quoted as saying. "Not just my career, but they went after my marriage, my livelihood, and smeared my name in truly extraordinary ways that no one had ever seen before or since—at least not until the Wilsons were victims of the same people years later." According to Barlow the allegations included the "fabrication" that he "was an 'intended' Congressional spy", that he was an alcoholic, had not paid his taxes, and was an adulterer. "Then they accused me of being psychotic and used that to invade my marital privacy, including that of my now ex-wife who also worked at the CIA, and sought to destroy my marriage as punishment."

Although he was found to have breached no national security regulations and was vindicated, Barlow did not receive his government pension and has had trouble finding employment. The authors of The Nuclear Jihadist, a biography of A.Q. Khan, caused a sensation in 2005 when they revealed that they had tracked him down to a motor home in Bozeman, Montana where he lived with two dogs.

== Wider implications ==
Pakistan has been the center of the world's largest atomic black market, according to nuclear-proliferation expert Robert Gallucci, who served in several high ranking positions in the administrations of George H. W. Bush and Bill Clinton. Pakistan could not have entered that market without the violations of US law that Barlow tried to expose. "They were worried someone like Rich [Barlow], in his stickler approach, would insist that if there's going to be testimony on the Hill about the F-16 aircraft, that the answers be full and truthful. He was a thorn in their side, and they went after him. And they did a very good job of screwing up his life." Gallucci's comments were supported by similar remarks from Danielle Brian, executive director of the Project on Government Oversight.

In 2007 a spokeswoman for Senator Charles E. Grassley (R-Iowa), a known champion of whistle-blowers, said the Senator is contacted each week by four new whistle-blowers looking for help. It's possible that all these whistle-blowers are wrong. It's also possible that the structure of the US political economy effectively forces incumbent public servants to routinely violate US and international law in pursuit of short-term objectives and persecute people like Barlow, who try to expose what they feel compelled to do.
