= Patriot Act Terrorist Exclusion List =

The Patriot Act Terrorist Exclusion List (TEL) was a list created by the United States Secretary of State under the authority of Section 411 of the USA Patriot Act of 2001 (8 U.S.C. § 1182), in consultation with or upon the request of the Attorney General, to designate an organization as a terrorist organization for immigration purposes. The Secretary of State can use classified and/or unclassified information available to the Secretary that a group has committed, or provided material support to further, terrorist acts. A TEL designation attempts to bolster homeland security efforts by allowing the US government to exclude from entry into the United States or to deport aliens associated with entities on the TEL. The list was updated on November 5, 2020, when the U.S. Department of State removed the East Turkestan Islamic Movement (ETIM) from the TEL. This was the first update since 2014.

TEL is one of four primary counter-terrorism lists established by the US government, the others being: the State Sponsors of Terrorism, Foreign Terrorist Organizations (FTO), and Executive Order 13224. Each list has its individual mechanisms, but they all serve to combat terrorism, punish terrorists and their supporters, and pressure changes in the behavior of designated states and groups.

== The List in 2021 ==
Terrorist Exclusion List Designees (alphabetical listing)

- Afghan Support Committee (a.k.a. Ahya ul Turas; a.k.a. Jamiat Ayat-ur-Rhas al Islamia; a.k.a. Jamiat Ihya ul Turath al Islamia; a.k.a. Lajnat el Masa Eidatul Afghania)
- Al Taqwa Trade, Property and Industry Company Ltd. (f.k.a. Al Taqwa Trade, Property and Industry; f.k.a. Al Taqwa Trade, Property and Industry Establishment; f.k.a. Himmat Establishment; a.k.a. Waldenberg, AG)
- Al-Hamati Sweets Bakeries
- Al-Ittihad al-Islami (AIAI)
- Al-Manar
- Al-Ma’unah
- Al-Nur Honey Center
- Al-Rashid Trust
- Al-Shifa Honey Press for Industry and Commerce
- Al-Wafa al-Igatha al-Islamia (a.k.a. Wafa Humanitarian Organization; a.k.a. Al Wafa; a.k.a. Al Wafa Organization)
- Alex Boncayao Brigade (ABB)
- Anarchist Faction for Overthrow
- Army for the Liberation of Rwanda (ALIR) (a.k.a. Interahamwe, Former Armed Forces (EX-FAR))
- Asbat al-Ansar
- Babbar Khalsa International
- Bank Al Taqwa Ltd. (a.k.a. Al Taqwa Bank; a.k.a. Bank Al Taqwa)
- Black Star
- Continuity Irish Republican Army (CIRA) (a.k.a. Continuity Army Council)
- Darkazanli Company
- Dhamat Houmet Daawa Salafia (a.k.a. Group Protectors of Salafist Preaching; a.k.a. Houmat Ed Daawa Es Salifiya; a.k.a. Katibat El Ahoual; a.k.a. Protectors of the Salafist Predication; a.k.a. El-Ahoual Battalion; a.k.a. Katibat El Ahouel; a.k.a. Houmate Ed-Daawa Es-Salafia; a.k.a. the Horror Squadron; a.k.a. Djamaat Houmat Eddawa Essalafia; a.k.a. Djamaatt Houmat Ed Daawa Es Salafiya; a.k.a. Salafist Call Protectors; a.k.a. Djamaat Houmat Ed Daawa Es Salafiya; a.k.a. Houmate el Da’awaa es-Salafiyya; a.k.a. Protectors of the Salafist Call; a.k.a. Houmat ed-Daaoua es-Salafia; a.k.a. Group of Supporters of the Salafiste Trend; a.k.a. Group of Supporters of the Salafist Trend)
- First of October Antifascist Resistance Group (GRAPO) (a.k.a. Grupo de Resistencia Anti-Fascista Premero De Octubre)
- Harakat ul Jihad i Islami (HUJI)
- International Sikh Youth Federation
- Islamic Army of Aden
- Islamic Renewal and Reform Organization
- Jamiat al-Ta’awun al-Islamiyya
- Jamiat ul-Mujahideen (JUM)
- Japanese Red Army (JRA)
- Jaysh-e-Mohammed
- Jayshullah
- Jerusalem Warriors
- Lashkar-e-Tayyiba (LET) (a.k.a. Army of the Righteous)
- Loyalist Volunteer Force (LVF)
- Makhtab al-Khidmat
- Moroccan Islamic Combatant Group (a.k.a. GICM; a.k.a. Groupe Islamique Combattant Marocain)
- Nada Management Organization (f.k.a. Al Taqwa Management Organization SA)
- New People's Army (NPA)
- Orange Volunteers (OV)
- People Against Gangsterism and Drugs (PAGAD)
- Red Brigades-Combatant Communist Party (BR-PCC)
- Red Hand Defenders (RHD)
- Revival of Islamic Heritage Society (Pakistan and Afghanistan offices — Kuwait office not designated) (a.k.a. Jamia Ihya ul Turath; a.k.a. Jamiat Ihia Al- Turath Al-Islamiya; a.k.a. Revival of Islamic Society Heritage on the African Continent)
- Revolutionary Proletarian Nucleus
- Revolutionary United Front (RUF)
- Salafist Group for Call and Combat (GSPC)
- The Allied Democratic Forces (ADF)
- The Islamic International Brigade (a.k.a. International Battalion, a.k.a. Islamic Peacekeeping International Brigade, a.k.a. Peacekeeping Battalion, a.k.a. The International Brigade, a.k.a. The Islamic Peacekeeping Army, a.k.a. The Islamic Peacekeeping Brigade)
- The Lord's Resistance Army (LRA)
- The Pentagon Gang
- The Riyadus-Salikhin Reconnaissance and Sabotage Battalion of Chechen Martyrs (a.k.a. Riyadus-Salikhin Reconnaissance and Sabotage Battalion, a.k.a. Riyadh-as-Saliheen, a.k.a. the Sabotage and Military Surveillance Group of the Riyadh al-Salihin Martyrs, a.k.a. Riyadus-Salikhin Reconnaissance and Sabotage Battalion of Shahids (Martyrs))
- The Special Purpose Islamic Regiment (a.k.a. the Islamic Special Purpose Regiment, a.k.a. the al-Jihad-Fisi-Sabililah Special Islamic Regiment, a.k.a. Islamic Regiment of Special Meaning)
- Tunisian Combat Group (a.k.a. GCT, a.k.a. Groupe Combattant Tunisien, a.k.a. Jama’a Combattante Tunisien, a.k.a. JCT; a.k.a. Tunisian Combatant Group)
- Turkish Hizballah
- Ulster Defense Association (a.k.a. Ulster Freedom Fighters)
- Ummah Tameer E-Nau (UTN) (a.k.a. Foundation for Construction; a.k.a. Nation Building; a.k.a. Reconstruction Foundation; a.k.a. Reconstruction of the Islamic Community; a.k.a. Reconstruction of the Muslim Ummah; a.k.a. Ummah Tameer I-Nau; a.k.a. Ummah Tameer E-Nau; a.k.a. Ummah Tameer-I-Pau)
- Youssef M. Nada & Co. Gesellschaft M.B.H.

Groups Delisted from the Terrorist Exclusion List (alphabetical listing)

- Communist Party of Nepal (Maoist) (a.k.a. CPN(M); a.k.a. the United Revolutionary People's Council, a.k.a. the People's Liberation Army of Nepal)
- Eastern Turkistan Islamic Movement (a.k.a. Eastern Turkistan Islamic Party; a.k.a. ETIM; a.k.a. ETIP)
- Libyan Islamic Fighting Group

== See also ==
- Executive Order 13224
- United States State Department list of Foreign Terrorist Organizations
- FBI Most Wanted Terrorists
