= Sultan Bashiruddin Mahmood =

Pakistani nuclear engineer (born 1940)

- سلطان بشیر الدین محمود
- Born: 1940 (age 85–86); Amritsar, Punjab, British India
- Citizenship: Pakistani
- Education: University of Engineering and Technology; University of Manchester
- Known for: Work in nuclear industry Founding Ummah Tameer-e-Nau
- Children: Lt Gen Ahmed Sharif Chaudhry Current DGISPR of Pakistan Army
- Awards: Sitara-e-Imtiaz (1998); Pakistan Academy of Sciences Gold Medal (1998)
- Scientific career
- Fields: Nuclear engineering
- Workplaces: Pakistan Atomic Energy Commission (PAEC)

Sultan Bashiruddin Mahmood (Note: alternative spellings: Sultan Bashir-ud-Din Mehmood. In news media of Pakistan, he is often known as Dr. Bashiruddin) (Urdu: سلطان بشیر الدین محمود; b. 1940) is a Pakistani nuclear engineer and a scholar of Islamic studies. After a career in the Pakistan Atomic Energy Commission (PAEC), he founded the Ummah Tameer-e-Nau (UTN) in 1999 – a radical organisation that was banned and sanctioned by the United States in 2001. He was the subject of a criminal investigation launched by Pakistan'sFederal Investigation Agency (FIA) over unauthorized travel to the Al-Qaeda in Afghanistan prior to the September 11 attacks in 2001. Mahmood has been listed and sanctioned by the Al-Qaida Sanctions Committee of the United Nations Security Council since December 2001. He has also been sanctioned as a Specially Designated Global Terrorist by the United States' Office of Foreign Assets Control, with an address listing at the Al-Qaeda Wazir Akbar Khan safe house in Kabul. He has also been under the European Union sanctions since 2002.

He has since been living in anonymity in Islamabad, authoring books on the relationship between Islam and science. His son Ahmed Sharif Chaudhry is the 22nd Director-General of Inter-Services Public Relations of the Pakistan Armed Forces.

== Life and education ==
Mahmood was born in Amritsar, Punjab, British India to a Punjabi Muslim family. There are conflicting reports concerning his date of birth; his personal admission record noted the birth year as 1940, while the UN reports estimated it as 1938. His father, Chaudhry Muhammad Sharif Khan, was a local zamindar (lit. feudal lord). His family emigrated from India to Pakistan following religious violence during the partition of India in 1947; the family settled in Lahore, Punjab. His son Ahmed Sharif Chaudhry serves as the 22nd Director-General of Inter-Services Public Relations of the Pakistan Armed Forces. Another son, Asim Mahmood, is a doctor.

After graduating with distinctions from a local high school standing at top of his class, Mahmood was awarded a scholarship and enrolled at the Government College University to study electrical engineering. After spending a semester there, he transferred to the University of Engineering and Technology, Lahore, and graduated with a Bachelor of Science with honours in 1960. His credentials led him to join the Pakistan Atomic Energy Commission (PAEC) where he gained another scholarship to study in the United Kingdom.

In 1962, Mahmood went to attend the University of Manchester where he studied for a double master's degree. First completing a masters' programme in control systems in 1965, he then received another master's degree in nuclear engineering in 1969 from the University of Manchester. While in Manchester, Mahmood was an expert on the Manhattan Project and was reportedly in contact with South African scientists in discussing the jet-nozzle method for uranium enrichment. However, it remains unclear how much interaction had taken place during that time.

== Career ==
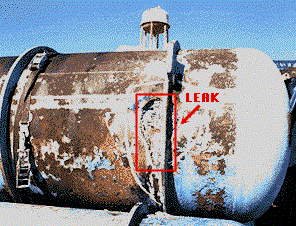
In 1970s, Mehmood gained praise for inventing and patenting a scientific instrument, naming SBM probe, to detect uranium hexafluoride (UF6) leak in nuclear steam cylinder as shown in the image.

Mahmood joined the Pakistan Atomic Energy Commission (PAEC) in 1968, joining the Nuclear Physics Division at the Pakistan Institute of Nuclear Science and Technology (PINSTECH) working under Dr. Naeem Ahmad Khan. His collaboration took place with Samar Mubarakmand, Hafeez Qureshi, and he was a vital member of the group before it was discontinued in 1970. Mahmood was one of the foremost experts on civilian reactor technology and was a senior engineer at the Karachi Nuclear Power Plant (KANUPP I)— the first commercial nuclear power plant in Pakistan. He gained notability and publicity in the Pakistan Physics Society for inventing a scientific instrument, the 'SBM probe', to detect leaks in steam pipes, a problem that was affecting nuclear plants all over the world and is still used worldwide.

After witnessing the Indo-Pakistani War of 1971, Mahmood attended the winter seminar at Multan and delivered a speech on atomic science. On 20 January 1972, the President of Pakistan, Zulfikar Ali Bhutto, approved a crash atomic weapon programme, under Munir Ahmad Khan, for the sake of "national survival." Nevertheless, Mahmood continued his work at the KANUPP I engineering division.

In the aftermath of 'Smiling Buddha', a surprise nuclear test conducted by India in May 1974, Munir Ahmad appointed Mahmood as the director of the enrichment division at PAEC, where the majority of calculations were conducted by Dr. Khalil Qureshi– a physical chemist. Mahmood analysed the gaseous diffusion, gas centrifuge, jet-nozzle and molecular laser isotope separation method for uranium-enrichment; recommending the gas centrifuge method as economical. After submitting the report, Mahmood was asked to depart to the Netherlands to interview Dr. Abdul Qadeer Khan on behalf of President Bhutto in 1974. In 1975, his proposal was approved and the work on uranium enrichment started with Mahmood as its director, a move that irked the more qualified but more difficult to manage Dr. Abdul Qadeer Khan, who had coveted the job for himself. His relations with Dr. Khan remained extremely tense and the pairs disagreed with each other and developed great differences. In private meetings with Munir Ahmad, Mahmood often complained and pictured him as "egomaniac". In 1976, Mahmood was removed from the enrichment division, Project-706, by Abdul Qadeer Khan, and Khan moved the enrichment division at the Engineering Research Laboratories (ERL) under military control.

Eventually, Munir Ahmad removed Mahmood from other classified works and posted him back to the Karachi Nuclear Power Plant (KANUPP-I) with no reason given as a principal engineer. In the 1980s, Munir Ahmad secured Mahmood a job as project manager for the construction of the Khushab Reactor (Khushab-I) where he served as chief engineer and aided with designing the coolant systems. In 1998, he was promoted as a director of the nuclear power division and held that position until 1999.

After the reactor went critical in April 1998, Mahmood said in an interview: "This reactor (can produce enough plutonium for two to three nuclear weapons per year) Pakistan had "acquired the capability to produce.... boosted thermonuclear weapons and hydrogen bombs." In 1998, Mahmood was honoured with the Sitara-e-Imtiaz award in a ceremony by Prime Minister Nawaz Sharif.

In 1998, he was promoted as a director of the nuclear power division and held that position until 1999.

== Politics ==
Though publicly endorsing the 1998 decision to carry out the Chagai-I nuclear tests by Prime Minister Sharif, Mahmood began appearing on news channels as an outspoken opponent of Sharif, as Mahmood vehemently opposed Pakistan becoming a signatory state of the Nuclear Nonproliferation Treaty (NPT) and Comprehensive Nuclear-Test-Ban Treaty (CTBT) just like neighbouring India. In Pakistan's popular news channels and newspapers, Mahmood gave numerous interviews, wrote articles, and lobbied against Sharif when he learned that the Prime Minister had been willing to sign anti-nuclear weapons treaties, prompting the Pakistan Government to forcefully transfer Mahmood to a non-technical position at PAEC.

Seeking premature retirement from PAEC in 1999, Mahmood moved towards publishing books and articles involving the relationship between Islam and science. Mahmood founded the Ummah Tameer-e-Nau (UTN)– a radical organisation– with his close associates. In 2000, he began attending lectures and religious sessions with Dr. Israr Ahmed who would later influence his political views and philosophy. Through UTN, Mahmood stepped into more radical politics, and began visiting Afghanistan where he wanted to be focused on rebuilding educational institutions, hospitals, and relief work.

=== 2001 debriefing and detention ===
In August 2001, Mahmood and his colleague Chaudhry Abdul Majeed at the UTN met with Osama bin Laden and Ayman al-Zawahiri in Kandahar, Afghanistan. Describing the meeting, the New York Times editorial quoted: "There is little doubt that Mahmood talked to the two al-Qaeda leaders about nuclear weapons, or that Al Qaeda desperately wanted the bomb". The New York Times later described Mahmood as "an autodidact intellectual with grand aspirations," and noted that "his fellow scientists at PAEC began to wonder if Mahmood was mentally sound." It further stated that Mahmood made it clear that he believed Pakistan's nuclear bomb was "the property of the whole ummah" (the worldwide Muslim community). "This guy was our ultimate nightmare," an American intelligence official had told the Times in late 2001.

Since 1999 and 2000 onwards, Pakistan's intelligence community had been tracking and monitoring Mahmood whose bushy beard advertised his deep attachment to the Afghan Taliban. After the September 11 attacks in the United States, the Federal Investigation Agency (FIA) launched a criminal investigation against him, leveling charges of unauthorized travel to Afghanistan. Director of the Central Intelligence Agency, George Tenet, later described intelligence reports of his meeting with Al Qaeda as "frustratingly vague." When asked by Pakistani and American investigators about the nature of Ummah Tameer-e-Nau's (UTN) work and discussions, Mahmood said that he had nothing to do with the al-Qaeda and was only working on humanitarian issues like food, health and education. Investigators from Inter-Services Intelligence (ISI) and the Central Intelligence Agency (CIA) were astonished and surprised at the extent of his nuclear weapons knowledge.

During his debriefing, his son Dr. Asim Mahmood, a family medicine doctor, told ISI officials that: "My father [Mahmood] did meet with Osama bin Laden and Osama Bin Laden seemed interested in that matter but my father showed no interest in the matter as he met him for food, water and healthcare matters on which his charity was working."

The FIA criminal probe continued for four months and yielded no concrete results. Pressure from Pakistani society and court inquiries against the FIA's criminal probe led to Mahmood's release in 2001. His family did confirm his release but had been constantly under surveillance by the FIA; his name was placed on the "Exit Control Lists" so he is not allowed to travel out of Pakistan. Since his release, Mahmood has been out of the public eye and lives a quiet life in Islamabad, devoting most of his time to writing books and doing research work on Islam and science.

Dr. Bashir Syed, former president of the Association of Pakistani Scientists and Engineers of North America (APSENA), said: "I know both of these persons and can tell you there is not an iota of truth that both these respected scientists and friends will do anything to harm the interest of their own country."

== Mahmood-Hoodbhoy debates ==
Mahmood has written over fifteen books, the most well-known being "The Mechanics of Doomsday and Life After Death", which is an analysis of the events leading to doomsday in light of scientific theories and Quranic knowledge. However, his scientific arguments and theories have been challenged by some prominent scientists in Pakistan. His religiosity and eccentricity began troubling the Pakistan Physics Society; his peers often quoted him as "a rather strange man".

In 1988, Mahmood was invited to the University of Islamabad to deliver a lecture on science. During his lecture at the university's 'Physics Hall' he and several other academicians debated his book. While debating, a well known Pakistani nuclear physicist, Dr. Pervez Hoodbhoy, and Mahmood, had an acrimonious public debate. Hoodbhoy had severely criticised Mahmood's theories and the notion of Islamic science in general, calling it ludicrous science. Mahmood protested that Dr. Hoodbhoy misrepresented his views, quoting: "This is crossing all limits of decency, he wrote. But should one expect any honesty or decency from anti-Islamic sources?"

=== Literature and cosmology ===
In his writings and speeches, Mahmood has advocated for nuclear sharing with other Islamic nations which he believed would give rise to Muslim dominance in the world. He has also written a tafseer of the Quran in English.

Mahmood is reported to be fascinated "with the role sunspots played in triggering the French and Russian Revolutions, World War II and assorted anti-colonial uprisings." According to his book "Cosmology and Human Destiny", Mahmood argued that sunspots have influenced major human events, including the French Revolution, the Russian Revolution, and World War II. He concluded that governments across the world "are already being subjected to great emotional aggression under the catalytic effect of the abnormally high sunspot activity under which they are most likely to adapt aggression as the natural solution for their problems". In this book, first published in 1998, he predicted that the period from 2007 to 2014 would be of great turmoil and destruction in the world. Other books written by him include a biography of the Islamic prophet Muhammad (sīrah) titled "First and the Last", while his other books are focused more on the relation between Islam and science like Miraculous Quran, Life After Death and Doomsday, and Kitab-e-Zindagi (in Urdu).

One passage of the book reportedly states: "At the international level, terrorism will rule; and in this scenario use of mass destruction weapons cannot be ruled out. Millions, by 2020, may die through mass destruction weapons, hunger, disease, street violence, terrorist attacks, and suicide."

Mahmood's lifelong friend, Member of Parliament Farhatullah Babar, who is currently serving as a spokesperson for the President of Pakistan, while talking to media, said: Mahmood predicted in Cosmology and Human Destiny that "the year 2002 was likely to be a year of maximum sunspot activity. It means upheaval, particularly on the South Asia, with the possibility of nuclear exchanges".

Mahmood has published papers concerning jinn, which are described in the Quran as beings made of fire. He has proposed that jinn could be tapped to solve the energy crisis. "I think that if we develop our souls, we can develop communication with them ... Every new idea has its opponents, he added. But there is no reason for this controversy over Islam and science because there is no conflict between Islam and science", Mahmood said to The Wall Street Journal in a 1988 interview.

== Bibliography ==
- 1980; Doomsday and Life After Death
- 1982; The Miraculous Qur'an: A Challenge to Science and Mathematics
- 1984; The Greatest Success
- 1985; The Life of Book: A Scientific interpretation of Quran
- 1986; Muhammad: The First & the Last
- 1988; A New Book of the Children Rhymes
- 1989; Judgement day and Life After Death
- 1994; The Holy Quran and Dirac equations
- 1995; The Miraculous Qur'an – A Discovery Concerning Its Arrangements into Chapter and Parts
- 1996; The Challenge of Reality
- 1998; Cosmology and Human Destiny: Impact of Sunpots on Earthly events; Our Past and Future
- 2005 A Tafseer of the Holy Quran. (English version) (2005)
- 2006 There is no God, but Allah
- 2006 Kitab-e-Zindagi Tafseer (Urdu version)
- 2010 Muhammad – The Prophet of Mankind

== Awards and honours ==
- Sitara-e-Imtiaz (Star of Excellence) award by the Government of Pakistan (1998)
- Gold medal, by the Pakistan Academy of Sciences (1998)

== See also ==
- Pakistan Academy of Sciences
- Pakistan Atomic Energy Commission
- Ummah Tameer-e-Nau
