= Ahmed Sharif Chaudhry =

Three Star Pakistani Army General

Ahmed Sharif Chaudhry HI(M) SBt
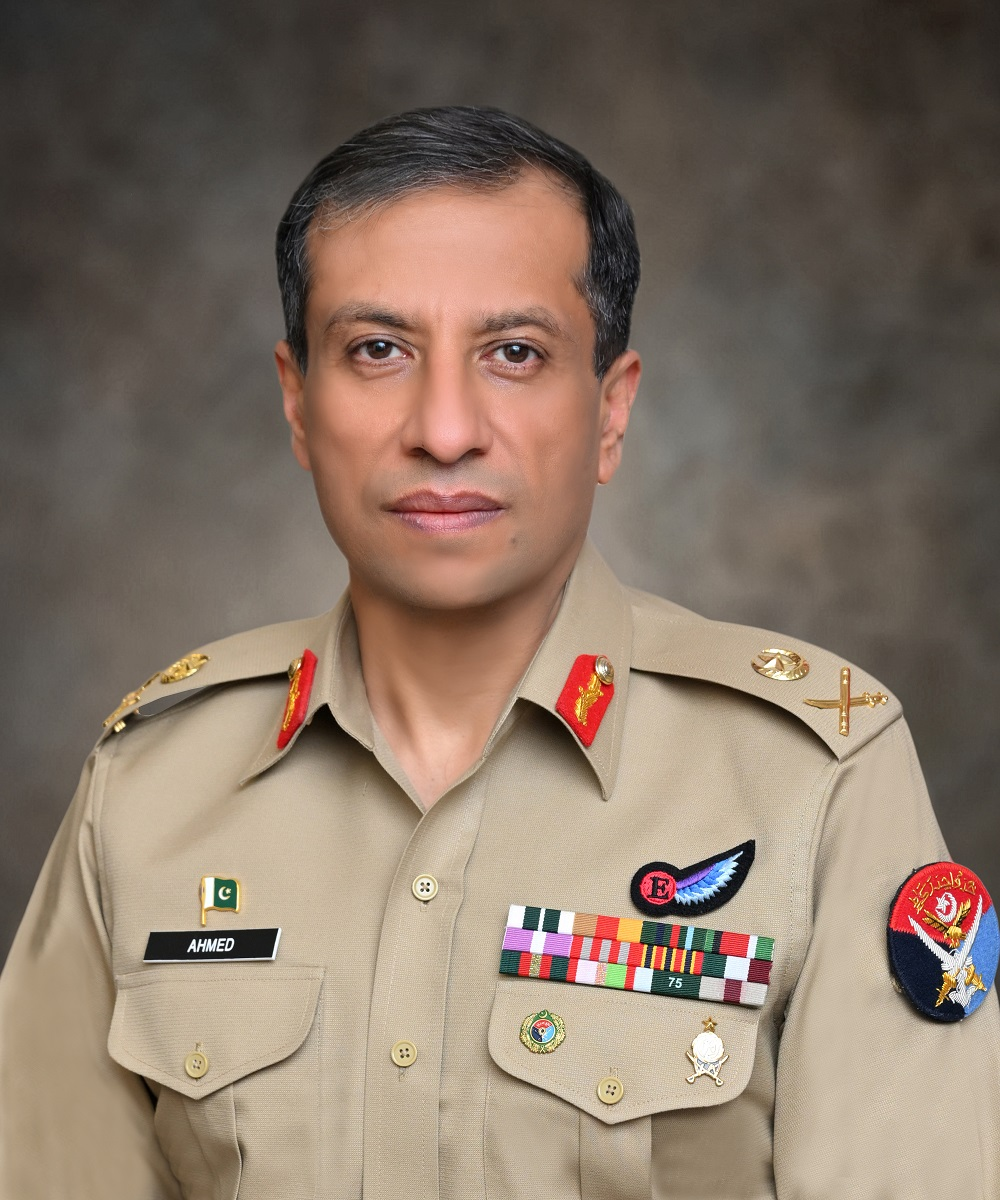

22nd Director-General of the ISPR
- Incumbent
- Assumed office 6 December 2022
- Preceded by: Babar Iftikhar

Personal details
- Born: Lahore, Punjab, Pakistan
- Parent: Bashiruddin (father)
- Awards: Hilal-i-Imtiaz (Military); Sitara-e-Basalat

Military service
- Allegiance: Pakistan
- Branch/service: Pakistan Army
- Rank: Lieutenant General
- Unit: 43 Electrical and Mechanical Engineers

Ahmed Shareef Chaudhry (Note: Urdu: احمد شریف چودھری) is a three-star General in the Pakistan Army. He is currently serving as the 22nd Director General of ISPR since 6 December 2022. He belongs to Pakistan Army Corps of Electrical and Mechanical Engineering.

== Early life ==
Chaudhry is the son of Sultan Bashiruddin Mahmood,a nuclear scientist and Islamic scholar . He is named after his grandfather, Chaudhry Muhammad Sharif. Chaudhry's pre-partition roots lie in Amritsar, now in Punjab, India.

== Career ==
Chaudhry is from the Electrical and Mechanical Engineering corps and previously served as Director General of Defense Science and Technology Organization, taking over in December 2022 and replaced Babar Iftikhar.

In 2022, Chaudhry became the first one from the EME corps to be appointed as the DG ISPR.

On 11 May 2024, Chaudhry was reportedly elevated to the rank of Lieutenant General.

== Activities ==
=== May 2024 press conference ===
On 8 May 2024, during a press conference in his capacity as DG ISPR, Chaudhry responded to inquiries regarding the potential for dialogue with Pakistan Tehreek-e-Insaf (PTI) by stating that "If some political mindset, leader or clique attacks its own army, causes rifts between the army and its people, insults the nation's martyrs and issues threats and hatches propaganda, then there can be no dialogue with them." He also remarked that the "there is only one way back for such political anarchists that PTI asks for an earnest apology in front of the nation and promises that it will forgo politics of hate and adopt constructive politics". On the same day, PTI termed Chaudhry's press conference as "‘a pack of lies’ and ‘full of contradictions and frustration". PTI also stated that the statements made by Chaudhry would deteriorate relations between the state and its people.

The following day, Imran Khan declined to offer an apology. Leader of the Opposition in the National Assembly Omar Ayub Khan also dismissed Chaudhry's press conference and questioned his authority to engage in political negotiations. Ayub further stated that Chaudhry appeared "confused and lacked narrative." On 10 May, PTI also labeled Chaudhry's press conference as "unconstitutional and illegal."

=== Role during May 2025 India–Pakistan conflict ===
Chaudhry condemned, as unprovoked aggression, Indian airstrikes under "Operation Sindoor" targeting alleged militant infrastructure in Pakistan and Pakistan-administered Kashmir, during renewed escalation of hostilities between India Pakistan after a terrorist attack in Kashmir.

He held several press briefings in which he presented Pakistan's official narrative, emphasizing civilian casualties and damage to religious sites. Chaudhry said that Pakistan would respond at a time and place of its choosing.

On 8 May 2025, India said its air defenses had intercepted Pakistani drones and missiles targeting several Indian cities, including Amritsar in the Indian state of Punjab. Amritsar is the seat of the Golden Temple, Sikhism's holiest shrine. In a subsequent press conference, Chaudhry instead accused India itself of launching ballistic missiles at Amritsar. He claimed India was targeting its own Sikh population and expressed sympathies for "Sikhs and minorities" in India. India denied the allegation of targeting its own cities as a "deranged fantasy" and called it an attempt to stoke internal religious division in the midst of the conflict.

Chaudhry further accused India of launching drone strikes and ballistic missile attacks into Afghanistan immediately after targeting Amritsar. This was denied by both the Taliban government of Afghanistan and the Indian government.

Chaudhry was awarded the Sitara-e-Basalat following his engagements in the warfare.

During the 2025 India–Pakistan conflict, Chaudhry referred to Hafiz Abdur Rauf, who had led funeral prayers for alleged militants killed in India's Operation Sindoor, as a "religious leader" and "family man." Media outlets including NDTV and Deccan Herald reported that Rauf had previously been designated by the United States and United Nations as a senior member of Lashkar-e-Taiba and former head of the banned Falah-e-Insaniat Foundation.

Following India's suspension of the Indus Waters Treaty after the 2025 Pahalgam attack, Hindustan Times and India Today reported that Chaudhry stated, "If you block our water, we will choke your breath," during a speech at a Pakistani university. Afghan politician Mariam Solaimankhil told India Today that the phrasing resembled earlier statements made by Lashkar-e-Taiba founder Hafiz Saeed.

On 23 May 2025, ARY News reported that Chaudhry described human rights activist Mahrang Baloch as a "terrorist-proxy" and urged media outlets to expose what he called her "sinister face." In response, Dawn reported that Farhatullah Babar, head of the Pakistan People's Party Human Rights Committee, cautioned against labeling rights activists as terrorists without due process. Baloch herself told Dawn that the allegations were "unsubstantiated" and said the press conference had been misused to misrepresent her stance.

In March 2026, Chaudhary stated that the targeted site during 2026 Kabul hospital airstrike was associated with militant activity; however, according to BBC reporting, the location was an addiction treatment hospital.
