= Pakistan and weapons of mass destruction =

Islamic Republic of Pakistan
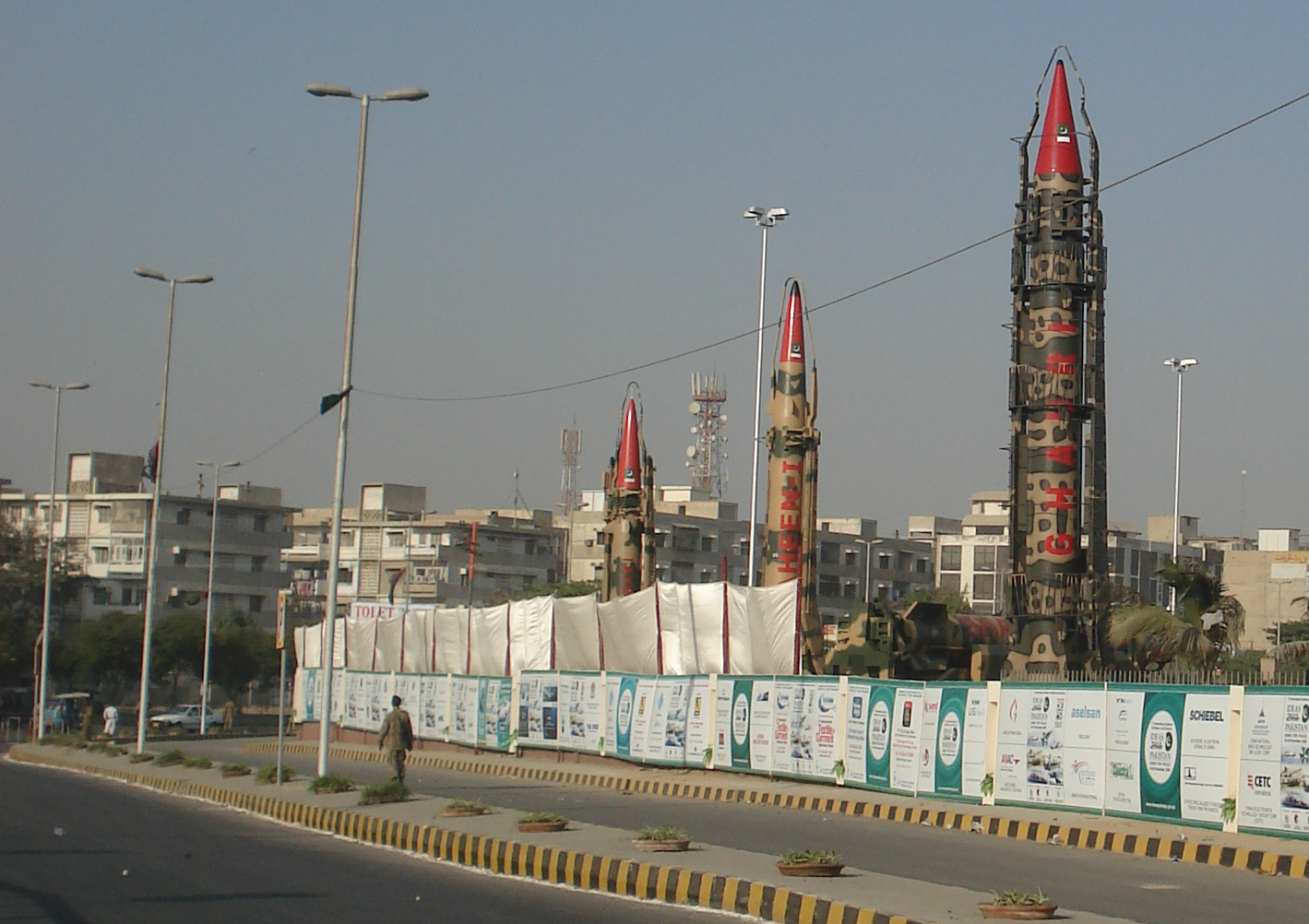
- Pakistani ballistic missiles on display, including a Shaheen-I (center), and a Ghauri-I (right)

- Territory controlled by Pakistan Territory claimed but not controlled (Kashmir, Junagadh, and Sir Creek)
- Nuclear program start date: 20 January 1972
- First nuclear weapon test: 28 May 1998 (Chagai-I)
- Last nuclear test: 30 May 1998 (Chagai-II)
- Largest yield test: 40 kt (PAEC claim)
- Total tests: 6 detonations
- Peak stockpile: 170 warheads (2025 estimate)
- Current stockpile: 170 warheads (2025 estimate)
- Maximum missile range: 2750 km (Shaheen-III)
- Nuclear triad: No
- NPT party: No

Pakistan is one of nine states that possess nuclear weapons. Pakistan is not party to the Nuclear Non-Proliferation Treaty. Pakistan's arsenal is estimated at 170 nuclear weapons as of 2025. Pakistan carried out two nuclear tests, Chagai-I and Chagai-II, both in 1998 and underground.

Pakistan's nuclear weapons programme began in 1972 under Prime Minister Zulfikar Ali Bhutto following Pakistan's defeat in the Indo-Pakistani War of 1971 and India's advancing nuclear programme. The programme was developed through a combination of domestic scientific research, clandestine procurement networks associated with Abdul Qadeer Khan, as well as external political and financial support.

During its early development, the government sought political and financial backing from several Muslim-majority countries and Arab states in the MENA region. Scholars identify Saudi Arabia as providing prolonged financial assistance that helped sustain the programme during periods of economic pressure and international sanctions, while Libya under then dictator Muammar Qaddafi is described as having provided both financial and material support during the programme's formative period.

Pakistan's nuclear weapons doctrine, full spectrum deterrence, officially rejects no first use, promising to use "any weapon in its arsenal" to protect its national interests in the event of an attack. Pakistan's primary strategic concern is potential conflict with India, which also possesses nuclear weapons.

Pakistan operates approximately 126 land-based missiles, primarily ballistic, of various short, medium, and intermediate ranges. Approximately 36 bombs and Ra'ad I/Ra'ad-II cruise missiles are assigned to Mirage III and Mirage 5 fighter aircraft. The Babur-III submarine-launched cruise missile is under development. Pakistan may possess smaller boosted fission weapons, but is not believed to have tested thermonuclear weapons.

Since 2001, US officials have prioritised safeguarding Pakistan's nuclear arsenal from potential nuclear terrorism, supplying equipment and training, and drafting military contingency plans.

Pakistan is not widely suspected of either producing biological weapons or having an offensive biological programme. Pakistan is a party to the Geneva Protocol, Chemical Weapons Convention, as well as the Biological Weapons Convention.

== History ==
After the Partition of India in 1947, India and Pakistan have been in conflict over several issues, including the disputed territory of Jammu and Kashmir. Multiple wars and conflicts, especially the 1971 Indo-Pakistan War and the subsequent Indian nuclear tests motivated Pakistan to become a nuclear power as part of its defence and energy strategies. Pakistan's subsequent pursuit of nuclear weapons was supported not only by domestic scientific development but also by financial assistance from several allied states during the early stages of the programme, including Libya and Saudi Arabia.

=== Initial non-weapon policy (Pre-1971) ===
In 1953, Foreign Minister Muhammad Zafarullah Khan publicly stated that "Pakistan does not have a policy towards the atom bombs". Following the announcement, on 11 August 1955, the United States and Pakistan reached an understanding concerning the peaceful and industrial use of nuclear energy which also included a pool-type reactor worth $350,000. Pakistan's nuclear energy programme was established and started in 1956, following the establishment of Pakistan Atomic Energy Commission (PAEC). Pakistan became a participant in US President Eisenhower's Atoms for Peace programme. Although proposals to develop nuclear weapons were made in the 1960s by several officials and senior scientists, Pakistan followed a strict non-nuclear weapon policy from 1956 until 1971, as PAEC under its chairman Ishrat Hussain Usmani made no efforts to acquire nuclear fuel cycle technology for the purposes of an active nuclear weapons programme.

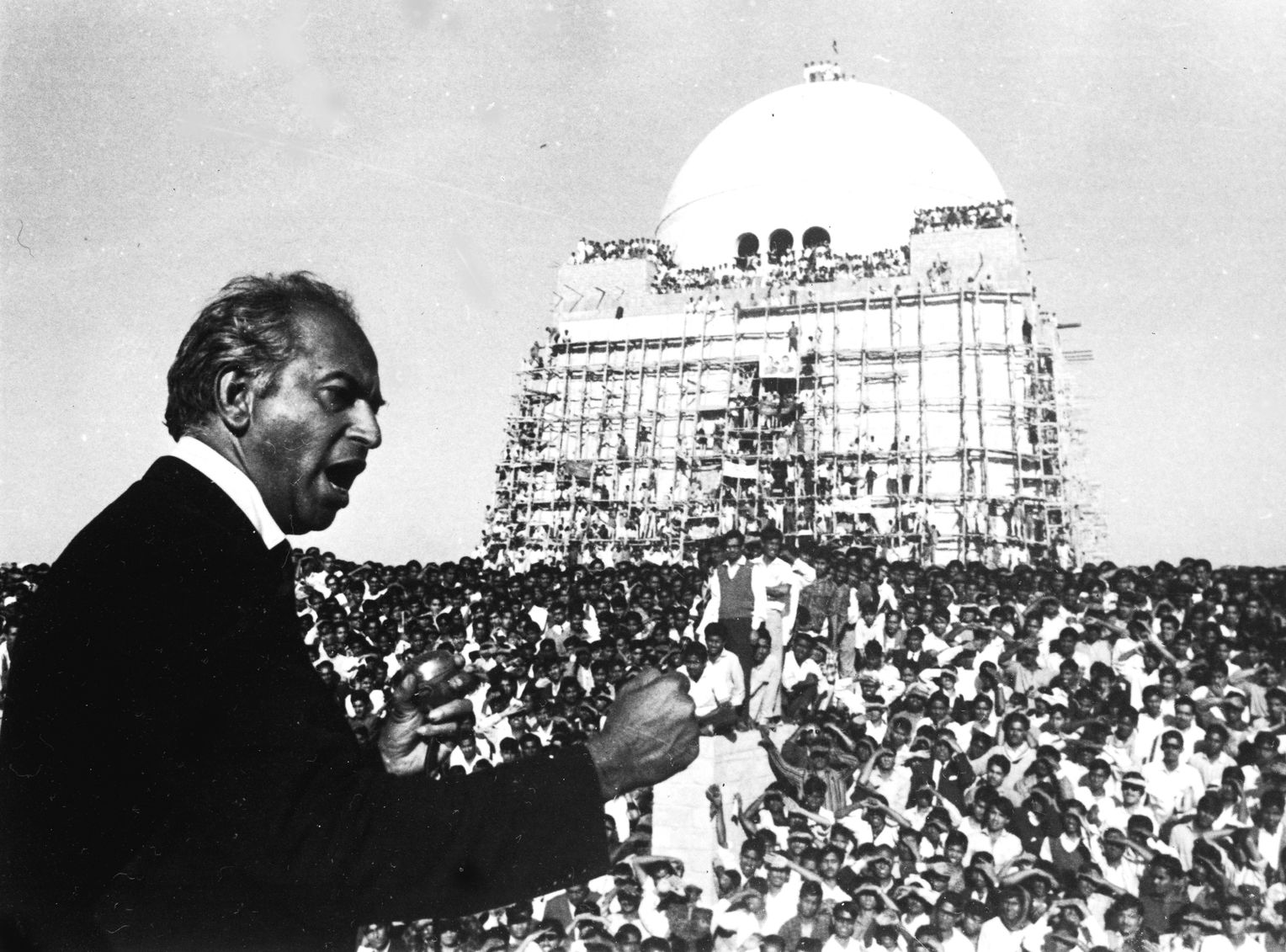
Bhutto in 1969. Pakistan began development of nuclear devices under Zulfikar Ali Bhutto's leadership with a commitment to having the design of device ready by 1976–77 to avert further foreign threat from India.

The first thing that was to be undertaken was the search for uranium, which continued from 1960 to 1963. Uranium deposits were discovered, and the first-ever national award was given to the PAEC. Mining of uranium began in the same year. Dr. Abdus Salam and Dr. Ishrat Hussain Usmani also sent a large number of scientists to pursue doctorate degrees in the field of nuclear technology and nuclear reactor technology. The next landmark under Abdus Salam was the establishment of PINSTECH – Pakistan Institute of Nuclear Science and Technology, at Nilore near Islamabad. The principal facility there was a 5MW research reactor, commissioned in 1965 and consisting of the PARR-I, which was upgraded to 10 MWe by Nuclear Engineering Division under Munir Ahmad Khan in 1990. The PARR-I reactor was, under the agreement signed by PAEC and ANL, provided by the US Government in 1965, and scientists from PAEC and ANL had led the construction. The Ayub Khan Military Government made then-science advisor to the Government, Abdus Salam, head of the IAEA delegation. Abdus Salam began lobbying for commercial nuclear power plants, and tirelessly advocated for nuclear power in Pakistan. In 1965, Salam's efforts finally paid off, and a Canadian firm signed a deal to provide the 137MWe CANDU reactor in Paradise Point, Karachi.

In the Indo-Pakistani War of 1965, which was the second of four openly declared Indo-Pakistani wars and conflicts, Pakistan solicited Central Treaty Organization (CENTO) assistance, but came under arms supply embargo in United Nations Security Council Resolution 211. Foreign minister (later Prime minister) Zulfikar Ali Bhutto aggressively began the advocating the option of "nuclear weapons programmes" but such attempts were dismissed by Finance minister Muhammad Shoaib and chairman Ishrat Hussain Usmani. Pakistani scientists and engineers' working at IAEA became aware of advancing Indian nuclear programme towards making the bombs. Therefore, In October 1965, Munir Khan, director at the Nuclear Power and Reactor Division of the International Atomic Energy Agency (IAEA), met with Bhutto on an emergency basis in Vienna, revealing the facts about the Indian nuclear programme and Bhabha Atomic Research Centre in Trombay. At this meeting Munir Khan concluded: "a (nuclear) India would further undermine and threaten Pakistan's security, and for her survival, Pakistan needed a nuclear deterrent...".

In 1969, after a long negotiation, the United Kingdom Atomic Energy Authority (UKAEA) signed a formal agreement to supply Pakistan with a nuclear fuel reprocessing plant capable of extracting 360 grams (13 oz) of weapons-grade plutonium annually. PAEC selected a team five senior scientists, including geophysicist Dr. Ahsan Mubarak, who were sent to Sellafield to receive technical training. Later Mubarak's team advised the government not to acquire the whole reprocessing plant, only key parts important to building the weapons, while the plant would be built indigenously. The PAEC in 1970 began work on a pilot-scale plant at Dera Ghazi Khan for the concentration of uranium ores. The plant had a capacity of 10,000 pounds a day.

=== Development of nuclear weapons (Post-1971) ===
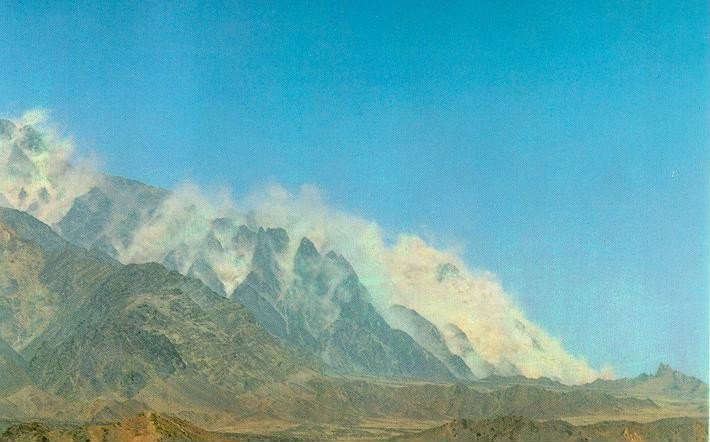
Image showing uplift of granite mountains as a result of Chagai-I test

The Bangladesh Liberation War was a defeat for Pakistan, which led to it losing roughly 56,000 square miles (150,000 km^{2}) of territory as well as losing more than half its population to the newly independent state of Bangladesh. In addition to the psychological setback for Pakistan, it had failed to gather any significant material support or assistance from its key allies, the United States and the People's Republic of China. Pakistan seemed to be isolated internationally, and in great danger; it felt that it could rely on no one but itself. Prime Minister Zulfikar Ali Bhutto was "obsessed" with India's nuclear programme, famously declaring that "We will eat grass, even go hungry, but we will have our own nuclear bomb." During this early phase of the programme Bhutto also sought financial and political support from friendly Muslim and Arab states, and countries such as Libya and Saudi Arabia provided financial assistance that helped sustain Pakistan's nuclear effort. At a United Nations Security Council meeting, Bhutto drew comparisons between the Instrument of Surrender that ended the 1971 war, and the Treaty of Versailles, which Germany was forced to sign in 1919. There, Bhutto vowed never to allow a repeat.

Pakistan began developing nuclear weapons in January 1972 under Prime Minister Zulfikar Ali Bhutto, who delegated the programme to the Chairman of the Pakistan Atomic Energy Commission (PAEC) Munir Ahmad Khan with a commitment to having the device ready by the end of 1976. At the Multan meeting on 20 January 1972, Bhutto stated, "What Raziuddin Siddiqui, a Pakistani, contributed for the United States during the Manhattan Project, could also be done by scientists in Pakistan, for their own people". Siddiqui was a Pakistani theoretical physicist who, in the early 1940s, worked on both the British nuclear programme and the Manhattan Project.

In December 1972, Dr. Abdus Salam directed a secretly coded memo to Pakistani scientists working at the International Centre for Theoretical Physics (ICTP) in Italy to report to the Chairman of the Pakistan Atomic Energy Commission (PAEC), Munir Ahmad Khan, informing them about the programme what was to be equivalent of the US "Manhattan Project." In an effort to instil a sense of pride, Salam noted that the heads of the Manhattan Engineer District were theoreticians, and informed the scientists at ICTP that a similar division was being established at PAEC; this marked the beginning of the "Theoretical Physics Group" (TPG). Other theoreticians at Quaid-e-Azam University would also join the TPG, then led by Salam who had done ground-breaking work for TPG. Among them was Riazuddin, Fayyazuddin, Masud Ahmad, and Faheem Hussain who were the cornerstone of the TPG.

Tedious mathematical work on fast neutron calculations, relativity, complex hydrodynamics and quantum mechanics were conducted by the TPG led by Salam until 1974 when he left Pakistan in protest, though he kept close contact with TPG. No such endeavours of the kind had taken place in the country and computerised numerical control (CNC) and basic computing facilities were non-existent at that time (though later acquired). For this purpose, the calculations on the high-performance computing and numerical analysis were performed by Dr. Tufail Naseem, a PhD graduate in mathematics from Cambridge University, assisted by other members of Mathematics Division– the division of pure mathematics at PAEC under Dr. Raziuddin Siddiqui and Asghar Qadir. About the lack of CNC facilities, Munir Ahmad Khan famously marked: "If the Americans could do it without CNC machines in the 1940s, why can't we do the same now.". With Abdus Salam departing, Munir Ahmad eventually led the TPG and assisted in the calculations. Two types of weapon design were analyzed: the Gun-type fission weapon and the implosion nuclear weapon. The programme turned to the more technically difficult implosion-type weapon design, contrary to the relatively simple 'gun-type' weapon.

Since PAEC, which consisted of over twenty laboratories and projects under reactor physicist Munir Ahmad Khan, was falling behind schedule and having considerable difficulty producing fissile material, Abdul Qadeer Khan, a metallurgist working on centrifuge enrichment for Urenco, joined the programme at the behest of the Bhutto administration by the end of 1974. Producing fissile material was pivotal to the Kahuta Project's success and thus to Pakistan obtaining the capability to detonate a nuclear weapon by the end of 1984. He pushed for the feasibility of highly enriched uranium (HEU) fissile material and collaborated under Bashiruddin Mahmood at the PAEC, a move that irked A. Q. Khan. Preliminary studies on gaseous centrifuge were already studied by PAEC in 1967 but yielded few results. A. Q. Khan advanced uranium enrichment from the expertise he had from the Urenco Group in the Netherlands. Under A. Q. Khan's supervision, the Kahuta Research Laboratories (KRL) was set up and engaged in clandestine efforts to obtain the necessary materials technology and electronic components for its developing uranium enrichment capabilities.

The TPG succeeded in the earlier implosion-type weapon design in 1977–78, with the first cold test conducted in 1983 by Ishfaq Ahmad. The programme evolved towards the boosted fission weapon designs that were eventually used in the Chagai-I tests in 1998. Enormous production was undertaken by the Pakistan Atomic Energy Commission for feasibility of weapons grade plutonium but parallel efforts were mounted toward weapons-grade uranium after India's test, the Smiling Buddha, in 1974.

In 1983, Khan was convicted in absentia by the Court of Amsterdam for stealing centrifuge blueprints, though the conviction was overturned on a legal technicality. A nuclear proliferation ring was established by Khan through Dubai to smuggle URENCO nuclear technology to KRL after founding the Zippe method for the gas centrifuge

On 11 March 1983, PAEC, led by Munir Ahmad Khan, carried out its first subcritical testing of a working nuclear device. This is also called a cold test, and was codenamed Kirana-I. There were 24 more cold tests from 1983 to 1994.

Coordination between each site was overseen by the Directorate of Technical Development (DTD) under Dr. Zaman Sheikh (a chemical engineer) and Hafeez Qureshi, a mechanical engineer. The DTD was established by Munir Ahmad Khan in 1974 and was tasked with development of tampers, reflective and explosive lenses, optics, and triggering mechanisms that are crucial in atomic weapons. First implosion design was built by TPG in 1977 and the DTD eventually conducted the cold-test on 11 March 1983, codename Kirana-I. Between 1983 and 1990, PAEC carried out 24 more cold tests of various nuclear weapon designs and shifted its focus towards tactical designs in 1987 that could be delivered by all Pakistan Air Force fighter aircraft.

Dr. Ishrat Hussain Usmani's contribution to the nuclear energy programme is also fundamental to the development of atomic energy for civilian purposes as he, with efforts led by Salam, established PINSTECH, that subsequently developed into Pakistan's premier nuclear research institution. In addition to sending hundreds of young Pakistanis abroad for training, he laid the foundations of the Muslim world's first nuclear power reactor KANUPP, which was inaugurated by Munir Ahmad Khan in 1972. Scientists and engineers under Khan developed the nuclear capability for Pakistan within the late 1970s, and under his leadership PAEC had carried out a cold test of nuclear devices at Kirana Hills, evidently made from non-weaponized plutonium. The former chairman of PAEC, Munir Khan, was credited as one of the pioneers of Pakistan's atomic bomb by a study from the London International Institute for Strategic Studies (IISS), on Pakistan's atomic bomb programme.

In his semi-official works of the Pakistani nuclear programme history, Eating Grass: The Making of the Pakistani Bomb, Major General Feroz Hassan Khan wrote that Prince Sultan bin Abdulaziz al Saud's visits to Pakistan's atomic facilities were not proof of a nuclear-sharing agreement between the two countries. However, Khan also acknowledged that "Saudi Arabia provided generous financial support to Pakistan that enabled the nuclear programme to continue." Scholars of Pakistan's nuclear history describe this financial assistance as part of broader strategic co-operation between Saudi Arabia and Pakistan during the Cold War period, particularly as Pakistan faced economic constraints and international pressure and sanctions while advancing its nuclear programme.

Following India's surprise nuclear test, codenamed Smiling Buddha in 1974, the first confirmed nuclear test by a nation outside the permanent five members of the United Nations Security Council, the goal to develop nuclear weapons received considerable impetus. Finally, on 28 May 1998, a few weeks after India's second nuclear test (Operation Shakti), Pakistan detonated five nuclear devices in the Ras Koh Hills in the Chagai district, Balochistan. This operation was named Chagai-I by Pakistan, the underground iron-steel tunnel having been long-constructed by provincial martial law administrator General Rahimuddin Khan during the 1980s. The Pakistani Atomic Energy Commission reported that the five nuclear tests conducted on May 28 generated a seismic signal of 5.0 on the Richter scale, with a total yield of up to 40 KT (equivalent TNT). Dr. A.Q. Khan claimed that one device was a boosted fission device and that the other four were sub-kiloton nuclear devices. The last test of Pakistan was conducted at the sandy Kharan Desert under the codename Chagai-II, also in Balochistan, on 30 May 1998. Pakistan's fissile material production takes place at Nilore, Kahuta, and Khushab Nuclear Complex, where weapons-grade plutonium is refined. Pakistan thus became the seventh country in the world to successfully develop and test nuclear weapons, although according to a letter sent by A.Q. Khan to General Zia, the capability to detonate a nuclear bomb using highly enriched uranium as fissile material produced at KRL had already been achieved by KRL in 1984.

=== Arab financial, material and political support ===
During this period, some commentators and political figures referred to Pakistan's prospective nuclear capability as an “Islamic bomb,” a term used to suggest that the development of a nuclear deterrent by Pakistan could serve the broader strategic interests of the Muslim world. Bhutto encouraged political support from Muslim-majority and Arab states by presenting Pakistan's nuclear effort as an achievement for the Islamic world and as a potential counterweight to the nuclear capabilities of regional rivals.

During the early stages of Pakistan's nuclear weapons programme in the 1970s, the government of Zulfikar Ali Bhutto sought financial and political backing from several Muslim-majority countries and Arab states following the Indo-Pakistani War of 1971. Scholars of Pakistan's nuclear history note that Bhutto approached a number of governments in the Middle East as Pakistan accelerated its nuclear development in response to India's strategic capabilities. Bhutto undertook a diplomatic tour of Muslim states in the Arab world and the Middle East shortly after the 1972 Multan Conference in order to mobilise political and financial support. These visits included Iran, Saudi Arabia, the United Arab Emirates, Turkey, Syria, Morocco, Egypt, Algeria, Tunisia and Libya.

Pakistan's pursuit of nuclear weapons was viewed sympathetically in parts of the Muslim world during the 1970s and 1980s. In his historical study of the programme, retired Pakistan Army major general and scholar Feroz Hassan Khan wrote that several Middle Eastern states, including Saudi Arabia, Libya, the United Arab Emirates were politically supportive of Pakistan's nuclear ambitions as the country faced increasing international nonproliferation pressure. Khan writes that Saudi Arabia, Libya, the United Arab Emirates and, to some extent, Iran under the Shah were determined not to allow Pakistan's nuclear effort to fail as international restrictions on nuclear technology intensified.

Historical studies identify Libya under Muammar Gaddafi and Saudi Arabia as among the states that provided financial assistance to Pakistan during the early development of the programme. Analysts have described this support as part of broader strategic co-operation between Pakistan and some governments in the Arab world during the Cold War. Khan notes that Libya became one of Pakistan's closest partners during this period, with Libyan and Pakistani officials holding meetings in Paris in 1973 to discuss nuclear co-operation and financial assistance, and estimates of Libyan support reaching $500 million. There was also material assistance from Libya in addition to financial support. Libyan assistance reportedly included uranium ore concentrate (“yellowcake”) acquired from Niger and transferred to Pakistan between 1976 and 1982. Libya controlled uranium deposits in the Ouzo Strip in Chad during the 1970s, which may have also further contributed to its ability to supply nuclear materials.

In his historical study of Pakistan's nuclear programme, retired Pakistan Army major general and scholar Feroz Hassan Khan wrote that Saudi Arabia provided financial assistance that helped sustain the programme during periods of economic pressure and international sanctions. This helped Pakistan sustain the development of its nuclear programme during its early years when the country faced economic constraints, sanctions and international pressure.

=== Alleged Israeli interference ===
In 1981, three West German engineering firms were targeted in bomb attacks and several others received threatening phone calls, allegedly carried out by the Israeli secret service. All of the companies were suspected of selling dual use technology to Pakistan for use in their nuclear weapons programme. Former Pakistan Army brigadier Feroz Hassan Khan alleged that in 1982 India worked with Israel to plan an attack similar to the previous year's surprise airstrike on Iraq's nuclear reactor, where Israeli F-16 fighters bombers escorted by F-15 air superiority aircraft would take off from Udhampur Air Force Station in Indian administered Kashmir and then fly low over the Himalayas to avoid early radar detection before attacking the Pakistani uranium enrichment centrifuge complex in the Rawalpindi city of Kahuta. Israel F-16 aircraft were also allegedly twice spotted in Pakistani air space in the days before the 1998 nuclear tests were carried out. Pakistan was so alarmed by the sighting that their then ambassador to the UN, Ahmed Kamal, held an emergency meeting with the UN Secretary-General Kofi Annan to seek reassurance from the international community that an attack was not imminent.

=== Policy ===
Pakistan is not known to have an offensive chemical weapons programme, and in 1993 Pakistan signed and ratified the Chemical Weapons Convention (CWC), and has committed itself to refrain from developing, manufacturing, stockpiling, or using chemical weapons.

Pakistan is not a party to the Non-Proliferation Treaty (NPT) and is not bound by any of its provisions. In 1999, Prime Ministers Nawaz Sharif of Pakistan and Atal Bihari Vajpayee of India signed the Lahore Declaration, agreeing to a bilateral moratorium on further nuclear testing. This initiative was taken a year after both countries had publicly tested nuclear weapons. (See Pokhran-II, Chagai-I and II)

Since the early 1980s, Pakistan's nuclear proliferation activities have not been without controversy. However, since the arrest of Abdul Qadeer Khan, the government has taken concrete steps to ensure that Nuclear proliferation is not repeated and have assured the IAEA about the transparency of Pakistan's upcoming Chashma Nuclear Power Plant. In November 2006, The International Atomic Energy Agency Board of Governors approved an agreement with the Pakistan Atomic Energy Commission to apply safeguards to new nuclear power plants to be built in the country with Chinese assistance.

=== Protections ===
In May 1999, during the anniversary of Pakistan's first nuclear weapons test, prime minister Nawaz Sharif claimed that Pakistan's nuclear security is the strongest in the world. According to Dr. Abdul Qadeer Khan, Pakistan's nuclear safety programme and nuclear security programme is the strongest programme in the world and there is no such capability in any other country for radical elements to steal or possess nuclear weapons. This claim is strongly disputed by foreign experts, citing the precedent of previous attacks of Pakistani military facilities and the nation's high level of instability.

=== Modernisation and expansion ===
A Washington-based Nuclear Watch think tank of Boston University has reported that Pakistan is increasing its capacity to produce plutonium at its Khushab nuclear facility. The sixth nuclear test (codename: Chagai-II) on 30 May 1998, at Kharan was quite a successful test of a sophisticated, compact, but "powerful plutonium bomb" designed to be carried by aircraft, vessels, and missiles. These are believed to be tritium-boosted weapons. Only a few grams of tritium can result in an increase of the explosive yield by 300% to 400%." Citing new satellite images of the facility, the Institute for Science and International Security (ISIS) said the imagery suggests construction of the second Khushab reactor is "likely finished and that the roof beams are being placed on top of the third Khushab reactor hall". A third and a fourth reactor and ancillary buildings are observed to be under construction at the Khushab site.

In an opinion published in The Hindu, former Indian Foreign Secretary Shyam Saran wrote that Pakistan's expanding nuclear capability is "no longer driven solely by its oft-cited fears of India" but by the "paranoia about US attacks on its strategic assets." Noting recent changes in Pakistan's nuclear doctrine, Saran said "the Pakistan Military and civilian elite is convinced that the United States has also become a dangerous adversary, which seeks to disable, disarm or take forcible possession of Pakistan's nuclear arsenals and its status as nuclear power."

As of 2014, Pakistan has been reportedly developing smaller, tactical nuclear weapons for use on the battlefield. This is consistent with earlier statements from a meeting of the National Command Authority (which directs nuclear policy and development) saying Pakistan is developing "a full-spectrum deterrence capability to deter all forms of aggression."

=== Arms control proposals ===
Pakistan has over the years proposed a number of bilateral or regional non-proliferation steps and confidence building measures to India, including:

- A joint Indo-Pakistan declaration renouncing the acquisition or manufacture of nuclear weapons, in 1978.
- South Asian Nuclear Weapons Free Zone, in 1978.
- Mutual inspections by India and Pakistan of each other's nuclear facilities, in 1979.
- Simultaneous adherence to the NPT by India and Pakistan, in 1979.
- A bilateral or regional nuclear test-ban treaty, in 1987.
- A South Asia Zero-Missile Zone, in 1994.

India rejected all six proposals.

However, India and Pakistan reached three bilateral agreements on nuclear issues. In 1989, they agreed not to attack each other's nuclear facilities. Since then they have been regularly exchanging lists of nuclear facilities on 1 January of each year. Another bilateral agreement was signed in March 2005 where both nations would alert the other on ballistic missile tests. In June 2004, the two countries signed an agreement to set up and maintain a hotline to warn each other of any accident that could be mistaken for a nuclear attack. These were deemed essential risk reduction measures in view of the seemingly unending state of misgiving and tension between the two countries, and the extremely short response time available to them to any perceived attack. None of these agreements limits the nuclear weapons programmes of either country in any way.

=== Disarmament policy ===
Pakistan has blocked negotiation of a Fissile Material Cutoff Treaty as it continues to produce fissile material for weapons.

In a recent statement at the Conference on Disarmament, Pakistan laid out its nuclear disarmament policy and what it sees as the proper goals and requirements for meaningful negotiations:

- A commitment by all states to complete verifiable nuclear disarmament;
- Eliminate the discrimination in the current non-proliferation regime;
- Normalise the relationship of the three ex-NPT nuclear weapon states with those who are NPT signatories;
- Address new issues like access to weapons of mass destruction by non-state actors;
- Non-discriminatory rules ensuring every state's right to peaceful uses of nuclear energy;
- Universal, non-discriminatory and legally binding negative security assurances to non-nuclear weapon states;
- A need to address the issue of missiles, including development and deployment of Anti-ballistic missile systems;
- Strengthen existing international instruments to prevent the militarisation of outer space, including development of ASATs;
- Tackle the growth in armed forces and the accumulation and sophistication of conventional tactical weapons.
- Revitalise the UN disarmament machinery to address international security, disarmament and proliferation challenges.

Pakistan has repeatedly stressed at international fora like the Conference on Disarmament that it will give up its nuclear weapons only when other nuclear armed states do so, and when disarmament is universal and verifiable. It rejects any unilateral disarmament on its part.

== Infrastructure ==
=== Uranium ===
Pakistan's uranium infrastructure is based on the use of gas centrifuges to produce highly enriched uranium (HEU) at the Khan Research Laboratories (KRL) at Kahuta. Responding to India's nuclear test in 1974, Munir Khan launched the uranium programme, codename Project-706 under the aegis of the PAEC. Physical chemist, Dr. Khalil Qureshi, did most of the calculations as a member of the uranium division at PAEC, which undertook research on several methods of enrichment, including gaseous diffusion, jet nozzle and molecular laser isotope separation techniques, as well as centrifuges. Abdul Qadeer Khan officially joined this programme in 1976, bringing with him centrifuge designs he mastered at URENCO, the Dutch firm where he had worked as a senior scientist. Later that year, the government separated the programme from PAEC and moved the programme to the Engineering Research Laboratories (ERL), with A.Q. Khan as its senior scientist. To acquire the necessary equipment and material for this programme, Khan developed a procurement ring. Electronic materials were imported from the United Kingdom by two liaison officers posted to the High Commission of Pakistan in London and Bonn Germany. The army engineer and ex-technical liaison officer, Major-General Syed Ali Nawab discreetly oversaw KRL operations in the 1970s including procuring the electronics that were marked as "common items." This ring was also illicitly used decades later, in the late 1980s and 1990s to provide technology to Libya (under Muammar Gaddafi), North Korea, and Iran. Despite these efforts, it is claimed Khan Research Laboratories suffered setbacks until PAEC provided technical assistance. Although, A.Q. Khan disputes it and counter claims that PAEC is merely trying to take credit for KRL's success and that PAEC hindered progress at KRL after the two programmes had been separated by Bhutto in 1976. In any case, KRL achieved modest enrichment of Uranium by 1978 and was ready to detonate an HEU uranium bomb by 1984. In contrast PAEC was unable to enrich any Uranium or produce weapons grade fissile material until 1998.

The televised screen-shot of Chagai-I on 28 May 1998

The uranium programme proved to be a difficult, challenging and most enduring approach to scale up to industrial levels to military-grade. Producing HEU as a fissile material is even more difficult and challenging than extracting plutonium and Pakistan experimented with HEU as an implosion design as contrary to other nuclear states. Little and rudimentary knowledge was available of gas centrifuges at that time, and HEU fissile material was only known to the world for nuclear power usage; its military applications for HEU were non-existent. Commenting on the difficulty, mathematician Tasneem Shah; who worked with A.Q. Khan, was quoted in the book Eating Grass that "hydrodynamical problem in centrifuge was simply stated, but extremely difficult to evaluate, not only in order of magnitude but in detailing also." Many of Khan's fellow theorists were unsure about the feasibility of the enriched uranium on time despite Khan's strong advocacy. One scientist recalled his memories in Eating Grass: "No one in the world has used the [gas] centrifuge method to produce weapon grade material.... [T]his was not going to work, he [A.Q. Khan] is simply wasting time." Despite A.Q. Khan having difficulty getting his peers to listen to him, he aggressively continued his research and the programme was made feasible in the shortest time possible. His efforts won him praise from Pakistan's politicians and military science circles, and he was now debuted as the "father of the uranium" bomb. On 28 May 1998, it was the KRL's HEU that ultimately created the nuclear chain reaction which led the successful detonation of boosted fission devices in a scientific experiment codenamed Chagai-I.

=== Plutonium ===
In July 1976 Abdul Qadeer Khan told leading Pakistani politicians that the Pakistani Atomic Energy Commission (PAEC) was completely incapable of meeting a deadline of December of that year for producing enough plutonium for a nuclear weapon. Shortly thereafter, he was placed in charge of a new organization independent of the PAEC tasked with producing plutonium for nuclear weapons. At that point, Pakistan had not yet completed the less difficult step of subcritical, cold testing, and would not do so until 1983 in Kirana Hills.

PAEC continued its research on plutonium and built the 40–50 MW (megawatt, thermal) Khushab Reactor Complex at Joharabad. In April 1998, Pakistan announced that the nuclear reactor was operational. The Khushab reactor project was initiated in 1986 by Munir Khan, who informed the world that the reactor was totally indigenous, i.e. that it was designed and built by Pakistani scientists and engineers. Various Pakistani industries contributed in 82% of the reactor's construction. The Project-Director for this project was Sultan Bashiruddin Mahmood. According to public statements made by the US Government officials, this heavy-water reactor can produce up to 8 to 10 kg of plutonium per year with increase in the production by the development of newer facilities, sufficient for at least one nuclear weapon. The reactor could also produce ^{3}H if it were loaded with ^{6}Li, although this is unnecessary for the purposes of nuclear weapons, because modern nuclear weapon designs use ^{6}Li directly. According to J. Cirincione of Carnegie Endowment for International Peace, Khushab's Plutonium production capacity has allowed Pakistan to develop lighter nuclear warheads that would be easier to deliver to any place in the range of the ballistic missiles.

PAEC also created a separated electromagnetic isotope separation programme alongside the enrichment programme, under Dr. G D Allam, a theoretical physicist. The plutonium electromagnetic separation takes place at the New Laboratories, a reprocessing plant, which was completed by 1981 by PAEC and is next to the Pakistan Institute of Nuclear Science and Technology (PINSTECH) near Islamabad, which is not subject to IAEA inspections and safeguards.

In late 2006, the Institute for Science and International Security released intelligence reports and imagery showing the construction of a new plutonium reactor at the Khushab nuclear site. The reactor is deemed to be large enough to produce enough plutonium to facilitate the creation of as many as "40 to 50 nuclear weapons a year." The New York Times carried the story with the insight that this would be Pakistan's third plutonium reactor, signalling a shift to dual-stream development, with Plutonium-based devices supplementing the nation's existing HEU stream to atomic warheads. On 30 May 1998, Pakistan proved its plutonium capability in a scientific experiment and sixth nuclear test: codename Chagai-II. There is controversy regarding environmental damage caused by the test, which dismissed by Balochistan media which worked with the government as misinformation, since the test were carried out hundred meters underground of Ras Koh hill and the explosions were not damaging any environment of the any areas in Pakistan or India.

=== Stockpile ===
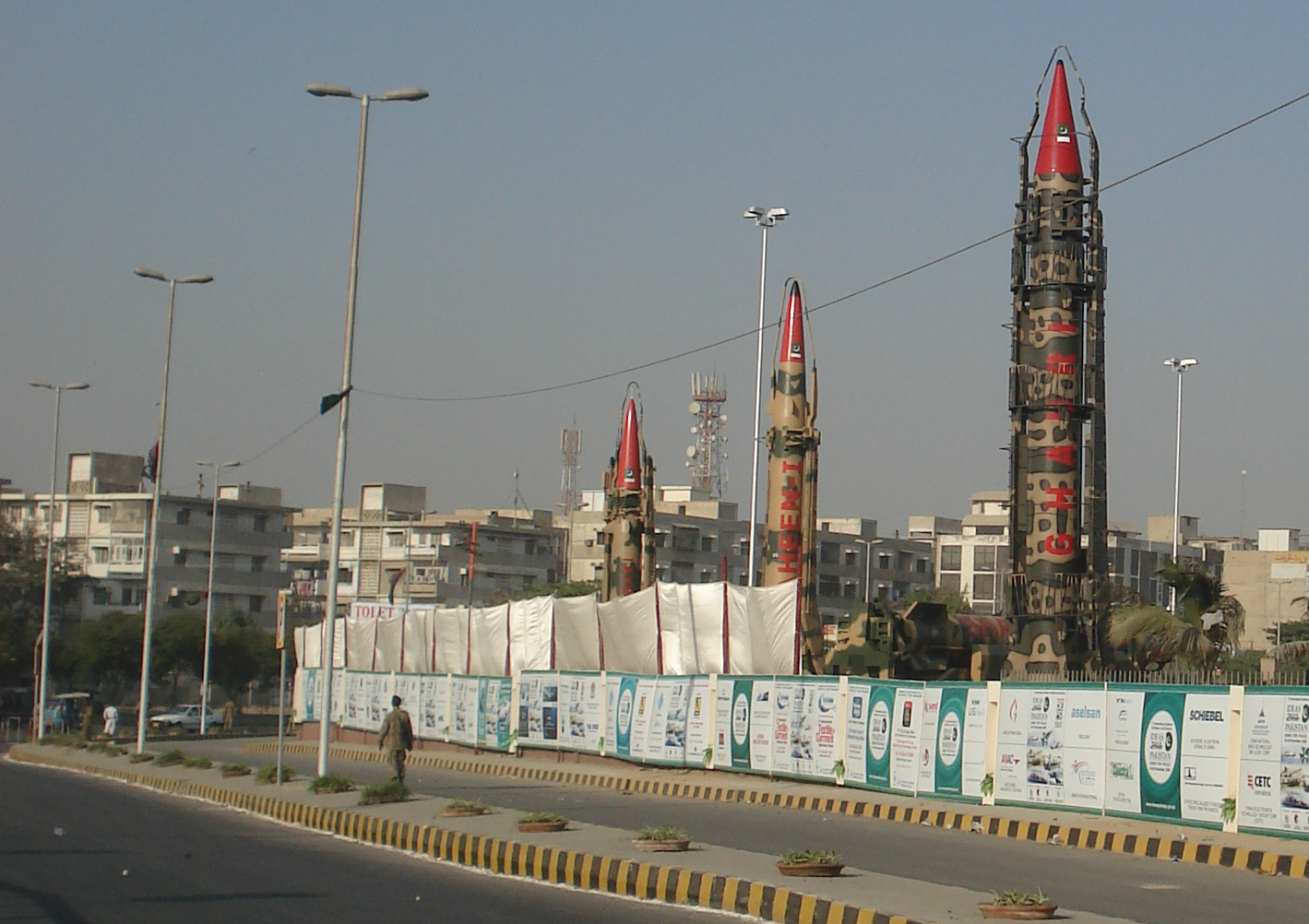
Pakistani Missiles on display at the IDEAS 2008 defence exhibition in Karachi, Pakistan

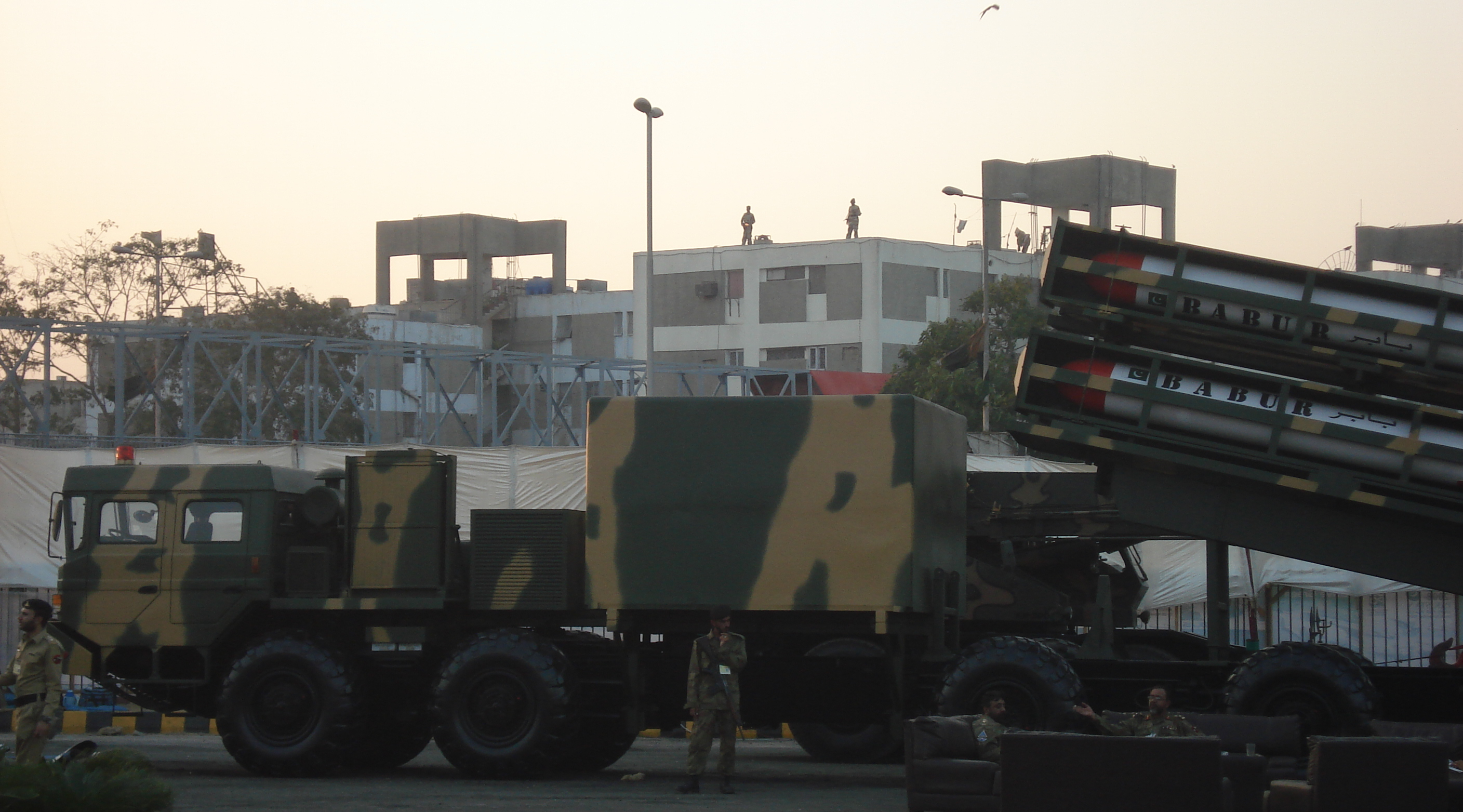
A truck-mounted launch system (TEL) armed with 4 Babur cruise missiles on display at the IDEAS 2008 defence exhibition in Karachi, Pakistan

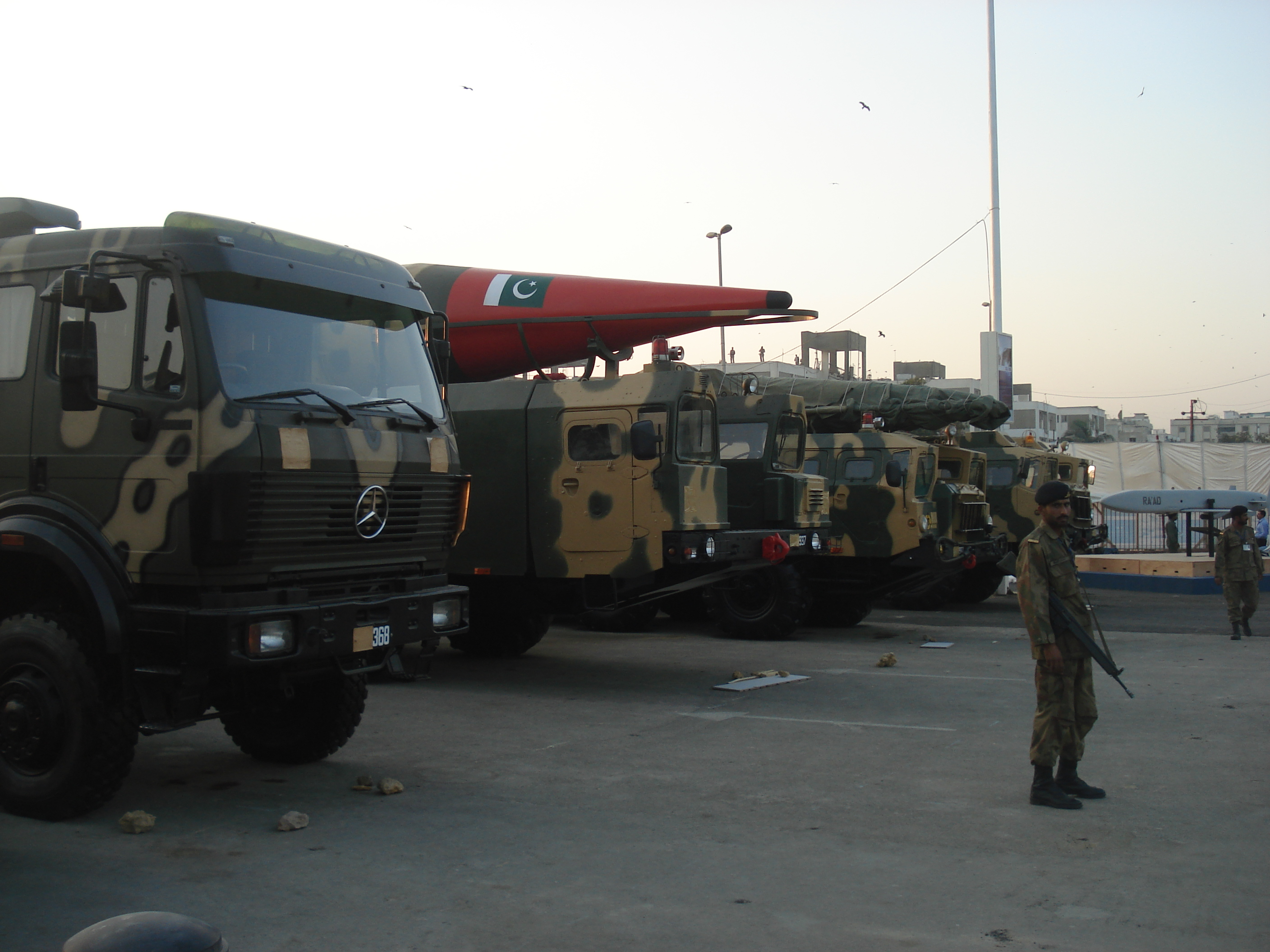
Truck-mounted Missiles on display at the IDEAS 2008 defence exhibition in Karachi, Pakistan

Estimates of Pakistan's stockpile of nuclear warheads vary. The most recent analysis, published in the Bulletin of the Atomic Scientists in 2023, estimates that Pakistan has 170 nuclear warheads. In 2001, the US-based Natural Resources Defense Council (NRDC) estimated that Pakistan had built 24–48 HEU-based nuclear warheads with HEU reserves for 30–52 additional warheads. In 2003, the US Navy Center for Contemporary Conflict estimated that Pakistan possessed between 35 and 95 nuclear warheads, with a median of 60. In 2003, the Carnegie Endowment for International Peace estimated a stockpile of approximately 50 weapons. By contrast, in 2000, US military and intelligence sources estimated that Pakistan's nuclear arsenal may be as large as 100 warheads. In 2018, the Federation of American Scientists estimated that the arsenal was about 120-130 warheads.

The actual size of Pakistan's nuclear stockpile is hard for experts to gauge owing to the extreme secrecy which surrounds the programme in Pakistan. However, in 2007, retired Pakistan Army's Brigadier-General Feroz Khan, previously second in command at the Strategic Arms Division of Pakistans' Military told a Pakistani newspaper that Pakistan had "about 80 to 120 genuine warheads."

On 27 April 2025, in a fiery response to India's declared suspension of the Indus Waters Treaty, Hanif Abbasi, the Pakistani Minister of Railways warned that any attempt to cut off Pakistan's water supply could lead to full-scale war and stated Pakistan's nuclear stockpile of 130 warheads was aimed towards India.

Pakistan's first nuclear tests were made in May 1998, when six warheads were tested under codename Chagai-I and Chagai-II. It is reported that the yields from these tests were 12 kt, 30 to 36 kt and four low-yield (below 1 kt) tests. From these tests Pakistan can be estimated to have developed operational warheads of 20 to 25 kt and 150 kt in the shape of low weight compact designs and may have 300–500 kt large-size warheads. The low-yield weapons are probably in nuclear bombs carried on fighter-bombers such as the Dassault Mirage III and fitted to Pakistan's short-range ballistic missiles, while the higher-yield warheads are probably fitted to the Shaheen series and Ghauri series ballistic missiles.

=== Second strike capability ===
According to a US congressional report, Pakistan has addressed issues of survivability in a possible nuclear conflict through second strike capability. Pakistan has been dealing with efforts to develop new weapons and at the same time, have a strategy for surviving a nuclear war. Pakistan has built hard and deeply buried storage and launch facilities to retain a second strike capability in a nuclear war. In January 2000, two years past after the atomic tests, US intelligence officials stated that previous intelligence estimates "overstated the capabilities of India's homegrown arsenal and understate those of Pakistan". The United States Central Command commander, General Anthony Zinni told the NBC that longtime assumptions, that "India had an edge in the South Asian strategic balance of power, were questionable at best. Don't assume that Pakistan's nuclear capability is inferior to the Indians", General Zinni quoted to NBC.

It was confirmed that Pakistan has built Soviet-style road-mobile missiles, state-of-the-art air defences around strategic sites, and other concealment measures. In 1998, Pakistan had 'at least six secret locations' and since then it is believed Pakistan may have many more such secret sites. In 2008, the United States admitted that it did not know where all of Pakistan's nuclear sites are located. Pakistani defence officials have continued to rebuff and deflect American requests for more details about the location and security of the country's nuclear sites.

=== Personnel ===
In 2010, Russian foreign ministry official Yuriy Korolev stated that there are somewhere between 120,000 and 130,000 people directly involved in Pakistan's nuclear and missile programmes, a figure considered extremely large for a developing country.

=== Alleged foreign co-operation ===
==== From China ====
Historically, the People's Republic of China (PRC) has been repeatedly charged with allegedly transferring missile and related materials to Pakistan. Despite China strongly dismissing the charges and accusations, the United States alleged China to have played a major role in the establishment of Pakistan's atomic bomb development infrastructure. There are also unofficial reports in Western media that the nuclear weapon technology and the weapon-grade enriched uranium was transferred to Pakistan by China. China has consistently maintained that it has not sold any weapon parts or components to Pakistan or anyone else. In August 2001, it was reported that US officials confronted China numerous times over this issue and pointed out "rather bluntly" to Chinese officials that the evidences from intelligence sources was "powerful." But they had been rebuffed by the Chinese, who have retorted by referring to the US support for Taiwan's military build-up which Beijing says is directed against it.

The former US officials have also disclosed that China had allegedly transferred technology to Pakistan and conducting putative test for it in 1980. However, senior scientists and officials strongly dismissed the US disclosure, and in 1998 interview given to Kamran Khan, Abdul Qadeer Khan maintained to the fact that, "due to its sensitivity, no country allows another country to use their tests site to explode the devices," although the UK conducted such tests in Australia and the United States. His statement was also traced by Samar Mubarakmand who acknowledged that cold tests were carried out, under codename Kirana-I, in a test site which was built by the Corps of Engineers under the guidance of the PAEC. According to a 2001 Department of Defence report, China has supplied Pakistan with nuclear materials and has provided critical technical assistance in the construction of Pakistan's nuclear weapons development facilities, in violation of the Nuclear Non-Proliferation Treaty, of which China is a signatory. In 2001 visit to India, the Chairman of the Standing Committee of the National People's Congress Li Peng rejected all the accusations against China to Indian media and strongly maintained on the ground that "his country was not giving any nuclear arms to Pakistan nor transferring related-technology to it." Talking to a media correspondents and Indian parliamentarians, Li Peng frankly quoted: "We do not help Pakistan in its atomic bomb projects. Pakistan is a friendly country with whom we have good economic and political relations."

In 1986, it was reported that both countries have signed a mutual treaty of peaceful use of civil nuclear technology agreement in which China would supply Pakistan a civil-purpose nuclear power plant. A grand ceremony was held in Beijing where Pakistan's then-Foreign Minister Yakub Khan signed on behalf of Pakistan in the presence of Munir Khan and Chinese Prime Minister. Therefore, in 1989, Pakistan reached agreement with China for the supply of the 300-MW commercial CHASHNUPP-1 nuclear reactor.

In February 1990, President François Mitterrand of France visited Pakistan and announced that France had agreed to supply a 900 MWe commercial nuclear power plant to Pakistan. However, after the Prime Minister Benazir Bhutto was dismissed in August 1990, the French nuclear power plant deal went into cold storage and the agreement could not be implemented due to financial constraints and the Pakistani government's apathy. Also in February 1990, Soviet Ambassador to Pakistan, V.P. Yakunin, said that the Soviet regime was considering a request from Pakistan for the supply of a nuclear power plant. The Soviet and French civilian nuclear power plant was on its way during the 1990s. However, Bob Oakley, the US Ambassador to Pakistan, expressed US displeasure at the recent agreement made between France and Pakistan for the sale of a nuclear power plant. After the US concerns the civilian-nuclear technology agreements were cancelled by France and Soviet Union.

Declassified documents from 1982, released in 2012 under the US Freedom of Information Act, said that US intelligence detected that Pakistan was seeking suspicious procurements from Belgium, Finland, Japan, Sweden and Turkey.

According to more recent reports, it has been alleged that North Korea had been secretly supplying Pakistan with ballistic missile technology in exchange for nuclear weapons technology.

Some reports also reveal continued supply of dual-use items from China to Pakistan in recent times. In February 2020, India caught the transshipment of an industrial autoclave from Jiangyin Port, China to Karachi. The shipment was stopped at Kandla Port in India on February 3, 2020. The autoclave on the ship was identified as an industrial dryer, a dual-use technology with relevance in the production of rocket motors for ballistic missiles. On January 23, 2024, India intercepted a Malta-flagged ship, CMA CGM-Attila, at Mumbai's Nhava Sheva Port, for carrying a “dual-use consignment” identified as a computer numerical control (CNC) machine, produced by an Italian company, from China to Pakistan. The shipment was being sent to “Pakistan Wings Pvt. Ltd.” in Sialkot and part of the consignment was for “Cosmos Engineering,” a Pakistani defence supplier.

==== From the United States ====
In July 1987, the FBI arrested Arshad Z. Pervez, a Pakistani-born Canadian, as he attempted to buy twenty-five tons of a specially strengthened steel, for which the primary use would be a uranium enrichment programme, according to Richard Barlow, who had been an intelligence analyst in the CIA at the time. This arrest resulted from a sting operation organised by Barlow and a counterpart from the CIA. The mark had failed to show for previous sting operations planned in joint with a representative of the US State Department.

This arrest made headlines, which led to hearings before the Asian and Pacific Affairs Subcommittee, chaired by Representative Solarz (D-NY), who had co-sponsored with Senator Larry Pressler (R-SD) the Pressler Amendment. That amendment stated that, "no military equipment or technology shall be sold or transferred to Pakistan" unless the President certifies annually "(1) that Pakistan not possess a nuclear explosive device; and (2) that new aid 'will reduce significantly the risk' that Pakistan will possess such a device." Senator John Glenn also said, "The Reagan and Bush administrations have practiced a nuclear nonproliferation policy bordering on lawlessness. They have undermined the respect of other countries for U.S. law and have done great damage to the nuclear nonproliferation effort."

Retired Army Major General David W. Einsel, then working for the CIA, and Barlow were asked to testify. Einsel gave evasive answers when asked if Pakistan had attempted to purchase anything that would have violated US export control requirements. Barlow was then asked essentially the same question. He said that the CIA knew of "scores" of Pakistani attempts to violate American export law. After that testimoney, Barlow said he was so harassed by Einsel and other senior CIA personnel that he resigned in 1988, though not before receiving the CIA's Exceptional Accomplishment Award.

In 1989 Barlow was hired as a proliferation analyst for the Department of Defence, where he produced a report indicating that Pakistan possessed the capability to use F-16 fighters to deliver nuclear weapons, based on information about how Pakistan had modified F-16s it had received from the United States. Barlow then learned that Deputy Assistant Secretary of Defence Arthur Hughes had stated the exact opposite in testimony before Congress, that using F-16s to deliver nuclear weapons "far exceeded the state of art in Pakistan." He found that the file copy of his report had been altered. He then told his management they should not lie to Congress. He was fired and his career destroyed.

=== Doctrine ===
Pakistan refuses to adopt a "no-first-use" doctrine, indicating that it would strike India with nuclear weapons even if India did not use such weapons first. Pakistan's asymmetric nuclear posture has significant influence on India's decision and ability to retaliate, as shown in 2001 and 2008 crises, when non-state actors carried out deadly attacks on Indian soil, only to be met with a relatively subdued response from India. A military spokesperson stated that "Pakistan's threat of nuclear first-use deterred India from seriously considering conventional military strikes." India is Pakistan's primary geographic neighbour and primary strategic competitor, helping drive Pakistan's conventional warfare capability and nuclear weapons development: The two countries share an 1800-mile border and have suffered a violent history—four wars in less than seven decades. The past three decades have seen India's economy eclipse that of Pakistan's, allowing the former to outpace the latter in defence expenditure at a decreasing share of GDP. In comparison to population, "India is more powerful than Pakistan by almost every metric of military, economic, and political power—and the gap continues to grow," a Belfer Center for Science and International Affairs report claims.

=== Theory of deterrence ===
The theory of "N-deterrence" has been frequently being interpreted by the various government-in-time of effect of Pakistan. Although the nuclear deterrence theory was officially adopted in 1998 as part of Pakistan's defence theory, on the other hand, the theory has had been interpreted by the government since in 1972. The relative weakness in defensive warfare is highlighted in Pakistan's nuclear posture, which Pakistan considers its primary deterrent from Indian conventional offensives or nuclear attack. Nuclear theorist Brigadier-General Feroz Hassan Khan adds: "The Pakistani situation is akin to NATO's position in the Cold War. There are geographic gaps and corridors similar to those that existed in Europe ... that are vulnerable to exploitation by mechanised Indian forces ... With its relatively smaller conventional force, and lacking adequate technical means, especially in early warning and surveillance, Pakistan relies on a more proactive nuclear defensive policy."

American political scientist Vipin Narang, however, argues that Pakistan's asymmetric escalation posture, or the rapid first use of nuclear weapons against conventional attacks to deter their outbreak, increases instability in South Asia. Narang supports his arguments by noting to the fact that since India's assured retaliation nuclear posture has not deterred these provocations, Pakistan's passive nuclear posture has neutralised India's conventional options for now; limited retaliation would be militarily futile, and more significant conventional retaliation is simply off the table."

The strategists in Pakistan Armed Forces has ceded nuclear assets and a degree of nuclear launch code authority to lower-level officers to ensure weapon usability in a "fog of war" scenario, making credible its deterrence doctrine. On further military perspective, the Pakistan Air Force (PAF), has retrospectively contended that "theory of defense is not view to enter into a "nuclear race", but to follow a policy of "peaceful co-existence" in the region, it cannot remain oblivious to the developments in South Asia." The Pakistan Government officials and strategists have consistently emphasised that nuclear deterrence is intended by maintaining a balance to safeguard its sovereignty and ensure peace in the region.

Pakistan's motive for pursuing a nuclear weapons development programme is never to allow another invasion of Pakistan. President Muhammad Zia-ul-Haq allegedly told the Indian Prime Minister Rajiv Gandhi in 1987 that, "If your forces cross our borders by an inch, we are going to annihilate your cities."

Pakistan has not signed the Non-Proliferation Treaty (NPT) or the Comprehensive Test Ban Treaty (CTBT). According to the United States Department of Defense report cited above, "Pakistan remains steadfast in its refusal to sign the NPT, stating that it would do so only after India joined the Treaty. Pakistan has responded to the report by stating that the United States itself has not ratified the CTBT. Consequently, not all of Pakistan's nuclear facilities are under IAEA safeguards. Pakistani officials have stated that signature of the CTBT is in Pakistan's best interest, but that Pakistan will do so only after developing a domestic consensus on the issue, and have disavowed any connection with India's decision."

The Congressional Research Service, in a report published on 23 July 2012, said that in addition to expanding its nuclear arsenal, Pakistan could broaden the circumstances under which it would be willing to use nuclear weapons.

=== Nuclear Command and Control ===
The government institutional organisation authorised to make critical decisions about Pakistan's nuclear posturing is the Pakistan National Command Authority (NCA), the genesis of which was in the 1970s and has been constitutionally established since February 2000. The NCA is composed of two civic-military committees that advises and console both Prime minister and the President of Pakistan, on the development and deployment of nuclear weapons; it is also responsible for war-time command and control. In 2001, Pakistan further consolidated its nuclear weapons infrastructure by placing the Khan Research Laboratories and the Pakistan Atomic Energy Commission under the control of one Nuclear Defence Complex. In November 2009, Pakistan President Asif Ali Zardari announced that he will be replaced by Prime Minister Yusuf Raza Gilani as the chairman of NCA. The NCA consists of the Employment Control Committee (ECC) and the Development Control Committee (DCC), both now chaired by the Prime Minister. The Foreign minister and Economic Minister serves as a deputy chairmen of the ECC, the body which defines nuclear strategy, including the deployment and employment of strategic forces, and would advise the prime minister on nuclear use. The committee includes key senior cabinet ministers as well as the respective military chiefs of staff. The ECC reviews presentations on strategic threat perceptions, monitors the progress of weapons development, and decides on responses to emerging threats. It also establishes guidelines for effective command-and-control practices to safeguard against the accidental or unauthorised use of nuclear weapons.

The chairman of the Joint Chiefs of Staff Committee is the deputy chairman of the Development Control Committee (DCC), the body responsible for weapons development and oversight which includes the nation's military and scientific, but not its political, leadership. Through DCC, the senior civilian scientists maintains a tight control of scientific and ethical research; the DCC exercises technical, financial and administrative control over all strategic organisations, including national laboratories and scientific research and development organisations associated with the development and modernisation of nuclear weapons and their delivery systems. Functioning through the SPD, the DCC oversees the systematic progress of weapon systems to fulfil the force goals set by the committee.

Under the National Command Authority, its secretariat, Strategic Plans Division (SPD), is responsible for the physical protection and to ensure security of all aspects of country's nuclear arsenals and maintains dedicated force for this purpose. The SPD functions under the Joint Chiefs of Staff Committee at the Joint Headquarters (JS HQ) and reports directly to the Prime Minister. The comprehensive nuclear force planning is integrated with conventional war planning at the National Security Council (NSC). According to the officials of Pakistan's military science circles, it is the high-profile civic-military committee consisting the Cabinet ministers, President, Prime minister and the four services chiefs, all of whom who reserves the right to order the deployment and the operational use of the nuclear weapons. The final and executive political decisions on nuclear arsenals deployments, operational use, and nuclear weapons politics are made during the sessions of the Defence Committee of the Cabinet, which is chaired by the Prime minister. It is this DCC Council where the final political guidelines, discussions and the nuclear arsenals operational deployments are approved by the Prime minister. The DCC reaffirmed its policies on development of nuclear energy and arsenals through the country's media.

=== US security assistance ===
From the end of 2001 the United States has provided material assistance to aid Pakistan in guarding its nuclear material, warheads and laboratories. The cost of the programme has been almost $100 million. Specifically the United States has provided helicopters, night-vision goggles and nuclear detection equipment. In addition, the US has funded the creation of a nuclear security training center, fencing, intrusion detectors, and identification systems.

During this period Pakistan also began to develop a modern export control regulatory regime with US assistance. It supplements the US National Nuclear Security Administration Megaports programme at Port Qasim, Karachi, which deployed radiation monitors and imaging equipment monitored by a Pakistani central alarm station.

Pakistan turned down the offer of Permissive Action Link (PAL) technology, a sophisticated "weapon release" programme which initiates use via specific checks and balances, possibly because it feared the secret implanting of "dead switches". But Pakistan is since believed to have developed and implemented its own version of PAL and US military officials have stated they believe Pakistan's nuclear arsenals to be well secured.

== Security Concerns ==
=== Security concerns of the United States ===
Since 2004 the US government has reportedly been concerned about the safety of Pakistani nuclear facilities and weapons. Press reports have suggested that the United States has contingency plans to send in special forces to help "secure the Pakistani nuclear arsenal". In 2007, Lisa Curtis of The Heritage Foundation, while giving testimony before the United States House Foreign Affairs Subcommittee on Terrorism, Nonproliferation, and Trade, concluded that "preventing Pakistan's nuclear weapons and technology from falling into the hands of terrorists should be a top priority for the US." However, Pakistan's government ridiculed claims that the weapons are not secure.

According to documents released by the National Security Archive, in 2001, Vladimir Putin expressed to George W. Bush, concerns about Pakistan's nuclear programme, characterising the country as a "military junta possessing nuclear weapons" while noting its lack of democratic governance. He raised the issue during broader discussions on security and nuclear proliferation and asked why Pakistan's nuclear status was not criticised more openly.

Diplomatic reports published in the United States diplomatic cables leak revealed US and British worries over a potential threat posed by Islamists. In February 2009 cable from Islamabad, former US Ambassador to Pakistan Anne W. Patterson said "Our major concern is not having an Islamic militant steal an entire weapon but rather the chance someone working in [Pakistani government] facilities could gradually smuggle enough material out to eventually make a weapon."

A report published by The Times in early 2010 states that the United States is training an elite unit to recover Pakistani nuclear weapons or materials should they be seized by militants, possibly from within the Pakistani nuclear security organisation. This was done in the context of growing Anti-Americanism in the Pakistani Armed Forces, multiple attacks on sensitive installations over the previous 2 years and rising tensions. According to former US intelligence official Rolf Mowatt-Larssen, US concerns are justified because militants have struck at several Pakistani military facilities and bases since 2007. According to this report, the United States does not know the locations of all Pakistani nuclear sites and has been denied access to most of them. However, during a visit to Pakistan in January 2010, the US Secretary of Defense Robert M. Gates denied that the United States had plans to take over Pakistan's nuclear weapons.

A study by Belfer Center for Science and International Affairs at Harvard University titled 'Securing the Bomb 2010', found that Pakistan's stockpile "faces a greater threat from Islamic extremists seeking nuclear weapons than any other nuclear stockpile on earth".

According to Rolf Mowatt-Larssen, a former investigator with the CIA and the US Department of Energy there is "a greater possibility of a nuclear meltdown in Pakistan than anywhere else in the world. The region has more violent extremists than any other, the country is unstable, and its arsenal of nuclear weapons is expanding."

Nuclear weapons expert David Albright author of 'Peddling Peril' has also expressed concerns that Pakistan's stockpile may not be secure despite assurances by both the Pakistani and US governments. He stated Pakistan "has had many leaks from its programme of classified information and sensitive nuclear equipment, and so you have to worry that it could be acquired in Pakistan," However the U.S. intelligence official said there is no indication that terrorists have gotten anything from Pakistan, and added there is confidence right now in Pakistan's security apparatus. The Pakistanis store their nuclear stockpile in a way that makes it difficult to put the pieces together; that is, components are located in different places. The official said Pakistan has put the appropriate safeguards in place.

A 2010 study by the Congressional Research Service titled 'Pakistan's Nuclear Weapons: Proliferation and Security Issues' noted that even though Pakistan had taken several steps to enhance Nuclear security in recent years 'Instability in Pakistan has called the extent and durability of these reforms into question.'

In April 2011, IAEA's deputy director general Denis Flory declared Pakistan's nuclear programme safe and secure. According to the IAEA, Pakistan is currently contributing more than $1.16 million in IAEA's Nuclear Security Fund, making Pakistan the 10th largest contributor.

In response to a November 2011 article in The Atlantic written by Jeffrey Goldberg highlighting concerns about the safety of Pakistan's nuclear weapons programme, the Pakistani Government announced that it would train an additional 8,000 people to protect the country's nuclear arsenal. At the same time, the Pakistani Government also denounced the article. Training will be completed no later than 2013.

Pakistan consistently maintains that it has tightened the security over the several years. In 2010, the Chairman Joint Chiefs General Tariq Majid exhorted to the world delegation at the National Defence University that, "World must accept Pakistan as nuclear power." While dismissing all the concerns on the safety of country's nuclear arsenal, General Majid maintains to the fact: "We are shouldering our responsibility with utmost vigilance and confidence. We have put in place a very robust regime that includes "multilayered mechanisms" and processes to secure our strategic assets, and have provided maximum transparency on our practices. We have reassured the international community on this issue over and over again and our track record since the time our atomic bomb programme was made overt has been unblemished."

On 7 September 2013, the US Department of State said "Pakistan has a professional and dedicated security force that fully understands the importance of nuclear security." Pakistan had earlier rejected claims in US media that the Obama administration was worried about the safety of Pakistan's nuclear weapons, saying the country has a professional and robust system to monitor its nuclear weapons.

In response to a November 2025 claim by President Donald Trump that Pakistan, among other countries, had been conducting nuclear weapons tests in secret, a Pakistani official said "Pakistan was not the first to carry out nuclear tests and will not be the first to resume nuclear tests."

In December 2024, U.S. national security official Jon Finer accused Pakistan of developing long-range nuclear missiles, which he said posed an emerging security threat to the United States. In March 2026, U.S. Director of National Intelligence Tulsi Gabbard told the Senate Intelligence Committee Pakistan's development of long-range ballistic missiles, could potentially include intercontinental ballistic missile capable of striking U.S. territory.

=== Regional Security Concerns ===
In a 1993 article in The New Yorker, investigative journalist Seymour Hersh detailed the May 1990 nuclear crisis between India and Pakistan, reporting that U.S. intelligence agencies had concluded Pakistan had assembled six to ten nuclear weapons, some possibly deployed on American-supplied F-16 aircraft. He noted that Prime Minister Benazir Bhutto was either excluded from or had distanced herself from nuclear planning, leaving control with President Ghulam Ishaq Khan and Army Chief General Mirza Aslam Beg. The crisis prompted the U.S. to send Deputy National Security Advisor Robert Gates on a secret mission to de-escalate tensions. Hersh also suggested that the Reagan administration had previously aided Pakistan's nuclear development, and described the episode as an early example of a state potentially using nuclear capability to shield covert support for terrorism, a strategy later referred to as nuclear weapon-enabled terrorism (NWET).

In a 2005 discussion with George W. Bush, Vladimir Putin expressed concern about nuclear proliferation links between Pakistan and Iran, citing the use of centrifuge materials of Pakistani origin, and the role of A.Q. Khan’s network in transferring nuclear technology.

U.S.-based analyst Michael Krepon, co-founder of the Stimson Center, expressed concern over growing mistrust in the nuclear doctrines of both India and Pakistan, highlighting that by 2015, Pakistan had become the world’s fastest-growing nuclear arsenal, with the capability to produce up to 27 warheads annually. Indian officials, however, reaffirmed their adherence to a policy of credible minimum deterrence and warned that any use of tactical nuclear weapons by Pakistan would trigger a massive retaliatory response.

During the course of 2025 India-Pakistan conflict, Pakistan's prime minister Shehbaz Sharif had reportedly called a meeting of the Pakistan National Command Authority on 10 May. However, after the conflict, Pakistani ministers denied that nuclear option was considered. In response, the Indian Defence Minister Rajnath Singh said Pakistan's nuclear arsenal should be under the surveillance of the International Atomic Energy Agency. Later on 12 May, in his first address since the brief conflict, the Indian Prime Minister Narendra Modi stated that India would not tolerate any "nuclear blackmail."

According to the United States Defense Intelligence Agency’s 2025 Worldwide Threat Assessment, Pakistan regarded India as an existential threat and pursued the modernization of its military capabilities, with particular emphasis on its nuclear weapons programme. The report noted that Pakistan focused on the development of tactical or battlefield nuclear weapons as a means to offset India’s conventional military superiority. It further stated that Pakistan had not adopted a “No First Use” nuclear policy and was expanding its nuclear arsenal, which was estimated to comprise approximately 170 warheads in 2024, with projections suggesting a potential increase to 200 by 2025. The assessment also highlighted that Pakistan's deepening defence co-operation with China served as a principal source of materials and technologies supporting Pakistan's weapons of mass destruction programmes.

In August 2025, Pakistan's army chief Field Marshal Asim Munir reportedly issued a nuclear threat against India during a dinner in Tampa, Florida, stating that Pakistan would "take half the world down" if faced with an "existential threat". India condemned the remarks as "nuclear sabre-rattling," while Pakistan's Foreign Office later claimed the comments were "distorted."

In March 2026, ex-high commissioner to India Abdul Basit threatened that if US were to attack Pakistan, the country's "default move" would be to target Indian cities such as New Delhi and Mumbai with nuclear weapons if US isn't within range.

=== Middle East ===
On 17 September 2025, Saudi Arabia and Pakistan signed a strategic mutual defence agreement that committed each country to respond to acts of aggression against the other. The agreement attracted attention because of longstanding discussion among analysts regarding a possible nuclear dimension to Saudi–Pakistani strategic relations. Historical studies of Pakistan's nuclear programme note that financial assistance from some Arab states played a role in supporting the programme during its early development in the 1970s. Scholars have written that Pakistan's leadership under Zulfikar Ali Bhutto sought financial backing from several Arab states and received financial backing from countries including Libya and Saudi Arabia during the early phase of the project following the 1971 war with India. This financial backing from Middle Eastern partners has been described by historians as an important factor that helped Pakistan sustain its nuclear programme during periods of economic strain and international sanctions. In his historical study of Pakistan's nuclear programme, Feroz Hassan Khan also wrote that Saudi Arabia provided financial assistance that helped sustain the programme during periods of economic pressure and sanctions. Pakistani Defence Minister Khawaja Asif initially stated, "No one should doubt what we have and what the capabilities are that will be available to them under this pact," a remark widely interpreted as implying nuclear coverage, though he later clarified that nuclear arms were "not on the radar" of the agreement. Ali Shihabi, a Saudi commentator with close ties to the Saudi monarchy, welcomed the "deterrence that comes from sharing Pakistan’s nuclear umbrella," although no official confirmation was provided and the full scope of the agreement remained unclear.

In March 2026, in response to Tulsi Gabbard's assessment that Pakistan's increased missile ranges would pose a threat to US in the future, Pakistani ex-diplomat Abdul Basit remarked that he prayed that the ranges would extend to the point that Israel can be targeted.

== Delivery systems ==
=== Land ===
As of 2011, Pakistan possesses a wide variety of nuclear-capable medium range ballistic missiles with ranges up to 2750 km. Pakistan also possesses nuclear-tipped Babur cruise missiles with ranges up to 700 km. In April 2012, Pakistan launched a Hatf-4 Shaheen-1A, said to be capable of carrying a nuclear warhead designed to evade missile-defense systems. These land-based missiles are controlled by Army Strategic Forces Command of Pakistan Army.

Pakistan is also believed to be developing tactical nuclear weapons for use on the battlefield with ranges up to 60 km such as the Nasr missile. According to Jeffrey Lewis, director of the East Asia Non-proliferation Programme at the Monterey Institute of International Studies, citing a Pakistani news article, Pakistan is developing its own equivalent to the Davy Crockett launcher with a miniaturised warhead that may be similar to the W54.

=== Air ===
The Pakistan Air Force (PAF) is believed to have practiced "toss-bombing" in the 1980s and 1990s, a method of launching weapons from fighter-bombers which can also be used to deliver nuclear warheads. The PAF has two dedicated units (No. 16 Black Panthers and No. 26 Black Spiders) operating 27 aircraft in each squadron (78 aircraft total) of the JF-17 Thunder, believed to be the preferred vehicle for delivery of nuclear weapons. These units are major part of the Air Force Strategic Command, a command responsible for nuclear response. The PAF also operates a fleet of F-16 fighters, of which 18 were delivered in 2012 and confirmed by General Ashfaq Parvez Kayani, are capable of carrying nuclear weapons. With a third squadron being raised, this would bring the total number of dedicated nuclear capable aircraft to a total of 75. The PAF also possesses the Ra'ad air-launched cruise missile which has a range of 350 km and can carry a nuclear warhead with a yield of between 10kt and 35kt.

A 2016 report by Hans M. Kristensen stated that "The F-16s were considered to be the first planes that are nuclear-capable in the Pakistan arsenal and the French Mirage III was upgraded as well to carry a new air launch cruise missile. But the United States made its case. What Pakistan does once they get the planes is inevitably up to them," he said. The report also stated that Pakistan is obliged under the terms of its contract to ask the US for permission before the fighters are converted. To date, the US has given only two countries (Pakistan and Israel) implicit permission to modify their F-16s to carry nuclear warheads.

It has also been reported that an air-launched cruise missile (ALCM) with a range of 350 km has been developed by Pakistan, designated Hatf 8 and named Ra'ad, which may theoretically be armed with a nuclear warhead. It was reported to have been test-fired by a Mirage III fighter and, according to one Western official, is believed to be capable of penetrating some air defence/missile defence systems.

=== Sea ===
The Pakistan Navy was first publicly reported to be considering deployment of nuclear weapons on submarines in February 2001. Later in 2003 it was stated by Admiral Shahid Karimullah, then Chief of Naval Staff, that there were no plans for deploying nuclear weapons on submarines but if "forced to" they would be. In 2004, Pakistan Navy established the Naval Strategic Forces Command and made it responsible for countering and battling naval-based weapons of mass destruction. It is believed by most experts that Pakistan is developing a sea-based variant of the Hatf VII Babur, which is a nuclear-capable ground-launched cruise missile.

On 9 January 2017, Pakistan conducted a successful launch of the Babur III missile from an underwater mobile platform. The Babur-III has a range of 450 km and can be used as a second-strike capability. It has been speculated that the missile is ultimately designed to be incorporated with Hangor-class submarine and the Agosta 90B class submarine which has been reported to have been modified. However no such tests have been carried out yet. On 29 March 2018, Pakistan reported that the missile had again been successfully tested.

With a stockpile of plutonium, Pakistan would be able to produce a variety of miniature nuclear warheads which would allow it to nuclear-tip the C-802 and C-803 anti-ship missiles as well as being able to develop nuclear torpedoes, nuclear depth bombs and nuclear naval mines.

==== Nuclear submarine ====
In response to INS Arihant, India's first nuclear submarine, the Pakistan Navy pushed forward a proposal to build its own nuclear submarine as a direct response to the Indian nuclear submarine programme. Many military experts believe that Pakistan has the capability of building a nuclear submarine and is ready to build such a fleet. In February 2012, the Navy announced it would start work on the construction of a nuclear submarine to better meet the Indian Navy's nuclear threat. According to the Navy, the nuclear submarine is an ambitious project, and will be designed and built indigenously. However, the Navy stressed that "the project completion and trials would take anywhere from between 5 to 8 years to build the nuclear submarine after which Pakistan would join the list of countries that has a nuclear submarine."

== Biological weapons ==
While suspicions have been raised regarding research into biological warfare, Pakistan is not widely believed to be producing or stockpiling biological weapons. In 1996, the U.S. Department of Defence noted that Pakistan possessed the necessary resources and expertise to conduct biological warfare R&D, and suggested that some research with potential biological warfare applications was underway. However, no concrete evidence has been provided by the U.S. government to substantiate these assertions.

Pakistan's advanced biotechnology sector is recognised as having the capability to support limited research and development related to biological weapons, should the government ever choose to pursue such activities. The Pakistani government has consistently denied any involvement in the development, production, or stockpiling of biological weapons or agents, emphasizing that offensive biological warfare programmes are not part of its defence strategy. Pakistan became a signatory to the Biological and Toxin Weapons Convention and ratified it in 1974. Since then, Pakistan has actively supported the convention, advocating for greater participation among member states, encouraging new signatories, and, as part of the non-aligned movement, promoting the right of states to engage in peaceful scientific research involving biological and toxin materials.

Only known incident of biological weaponry related to Pakistan is the arrest of two retired nuclear scientists by Pakistan authorities after discovering documents related to anthrax weapons in their offices. These scientists were linked to an organisation which was found to have ties to Al-Qaeda, and documents seized from their facilities in Kabul included materials on biological weapons, specifically anthrax, and designs for crude delivery systems such as balloons.

== Chemical weapons ==
Pakistan has no publicly acknowledged chemical weapons programme, and is a signatory and ratified member of the 1993 Chemical Weapons Convention (CWC) and maintains active membership in the Organisation for the Prohibition of Chemical Weapons (OPCW). As part of its obligations, Pakistan has enacted strict national legislation prohibiting the development, production, and use of chemical weapons, and has mandated that all domestic chemical producers report their chemical imports. While Pakistan possesses the technical knowledge to potentially produce various chemical warfare agents, its government remains legally bound to refrain from any such activities. Since ratifying the CWC in 1997, Pakistan has undergone regular OPCW inspections of its chemical industry. These inspections have not uncovered any irregularities or violations.

== See also ==
- Weapons of mass destruction
- Protocol Agreement-2026 (Pakistan–Kuwait)
- Chronology of Pakistan's rocket tests
  - Hatf Programme
  - List of missiles of Pakistan
- Nuclear industry
  - Nuclear power in Pakistan
- Nuclear weapons policy
  - Pakistan Armed Forces
  - Nuclear doctrine of Pakistan
- Nuclear Command and Control
  - National Command Authority (Pakistan)
