= Khushab Nuclear complex =

Nuclear research complex in Khushab, Pakistan

Khushab Nuclear Complex
- Country: Pakistan
- Location: Khushab District, Punjab
- Coordinates: 32°0′19.56″N 72°11′19.92″E
- Status: Active
- Construction began: 1985
- Commission date: 1 March 1996; 27 March 1997 (Achieved Criticality)
- Construction cost: US$ 350 million ($1.05 billion in 2025) (Estimated)
- Owner: Government of Pakistan
- Operator: Pakistan Atomic Energy Commission (PAEC) on behalf of National Command Authority

Nuclear power station
- Reactors: 4 (Active); 1 (in possible)
- Reactor type: HWR; Pu-production-type
- Reactor supplier: Pakistan Atomic Energy Commission (PAEC)
- Site area: N/A
- Cooling towers: 4
- Cooling source: Gas-cooled (Possibly, the heat exchangers)
- Thermal capacity: 4x50 megawatt-hours (0.050 GWh)

Power generation
- Units operational: Unit 1: 1996, Unit 2: 2010 (unofficial), Unit 3: 2013 (unofficial), Unit 4: 2015 (unofficial)

The Khushab Nuclear Complex (or simply Khushab Complex) is a plasma physics and heavy water research complex situated 30 kilometres (19 mi) south of the town of Jauharabad in Khushab District, Punjab, Pakistan.

Planning of the complex started in 1973 but the construction of the complex was commenced in 1985 to produce plutonium, deutrium, and tritium.

Various organizations have built and contributed in building the reactor and is commonly called "the Complex". Four currently operating reactors have capacities variously reported at between 40 MWth to 50 MWth, and as high as 70 MWth. In total, they are estimated to be capable of producing 44 kilograms (97 lb) of specially graded plutonium annually, and their absence of usage in civilian energy has been attracted much publicized international criticism.

Pakistan's first indigenous nuclear reactor was commissioned at Khushab in March 1996. The Khushab Nuclear Complex was conceived and planned by the then chairman of the Pakistan Atomic Energy Commission (PAEC), Munir Ahmad Khan, who began work on the 50 MWth Khushab-I reactor and heavy water plant in 1986. He appointed nuclear engineer Sultan Bashiruddin Mahmood and Dr. N.A. Javed, both from the PAEC, as the Project-Directors for the reactor and the heavy water plant respectively. According to a Pakistani press report this reactor began operating in early 1998.

Based on the success of these projects and the experience and capability gained during their construction, onsite construction work on the second unit began around 2001 or 2002. In February 2010 Prime Minister Yousaf Raza Gillani and senior military officers attended a ceremony at the Khushab complex for what is believed to be the completion of the second reactor. Over the nature and research scope of the Complex, the Government of Pakistan officially has not made any comments nor provide insights of other aspects of the nuclear weapons program since the late 1990s.

Judging by external appearance all but the first reactor are similar or identical in design.

== Overview ==
The Khushab Nuclear Complex is a federal research facility that is strategically located between the jurisdiction of the PAF Base Mushaf and the PAF Base Sakesar. It is known from literary investigation that complex is located in isolate and deep desert inside Punjab, making it nearly impossible to conduct counterproliferation strikes. There is no major civilian population but the lack of fresh water and arid terrain caused construction delays and raised costs.

A Plasma Physics Group from the PINSTECH Laboratory has been engaged in research on nuclear fusion, including inertial confinement fusion, particularly on the properties of tritium and D-T reactions, at the Khushab Nuclear Complex since the 1990s.

=== PAKNUR ===
The PAKNUR (Pakistan Nuclear Reactor), which is also known as Khushab Production Reactor is a military nuclear reactor at the Kushab Nuclear Complex. There are four military reactors, that follows the designation of Khushab-1—4, while the fifth reactor is believed to be under construction. The Khushab reactors are the only nuclear power reactors that are purposed for the defense related development and are not subjected to international inspections but its safety is professed by the federal nuclear regulatories of Pakistan.

The actual design of the nuclear reactor is highly classified but it is believed to be modeled after the India's CIRUS and the Canadian NRX or British Magnox designs, according to the testimony provided in Eating Grass in 2012.

In 1973, the Pakistan Atomic Energy Commission (PAEC) completed a feasibility plans for the design of the 50–70MWt reactor, which was to replicate the either CIRUS, MAGNOX, or NRX-type reactor. In 1974, Munir Ahmad Khan, its first design engineer, submitted the overall reactor design but the funding was ceased due to lack of local resources available at that time and the prioritization of mining uranium instead.

In 1985, the PAKNUR project was restarted as Khushab Production Reactor with S. B. Mahmood becoming its chief engineer and project manager. In 1987, the civil engineering construction began near Jauharabad but at the area of command vicinity of the PAF Base Mushaf. The construction and materials were provided as a joint venture of Descon Engineering Inc., Ittefaq Steels Ltd., and the HMC. Designing of the reactor was quiet difficult in the absence of international vendors, and the international community raised questions about Pakistan's capability to even design and produce a nuclear reactor. In 1990, a separate Heavy-water reactor (HWR) design was approved when its designer, Dr. N. A. Javed (PhD in chemistry from Karlsruhe Institute in Germany), was appointed its project manager. Difficulties in designing of the reactor continued throughout the years with one U.S. Department of Defense report commenting on the efforts which highlighted the country's limited capability and lacked the necessary testing environment for the nuclear materials. Despite the U.S. and the Western skepticism, the engineering work at the site and the reactor designing continued by the PAEC.

In 1996, the PAKNUR eventually went into successful criticality, and its designer Dr. N.A. Javed was promptly recognized of his efforts and services when federal Government of Pakistan honored him with Sitara-i-Imtiaz (lit. Star of Excellence). In 1999, its chief engineer S.B. Mahmood was also honored with the same award by the Government of Pakistan.

Commenting on the feat in 1997, the Voice of Time, a conservative newspaper, had reported that "Pakistan had broken the Western monopoly in heavy water production".

== Reactors ==
- Khushab-I was commissioned in March 1996 and had gone critical and begun production by early 1998.
- Construction of Khushab-II started in 2001. It was complete by 2010.
- The construction of Khushab-III started in 2006 and was complete by 2013. Similar to the other three completed reactors, Khushab-III is a 50 MWth heavy water reactor producing 11-15 kilograms of plutonium a year for Pakistan's nuclear weapons programme.
- Construction of Khushab-IV started in 2011. In January 2015 the reactor was believed to be complete and operational.
- A further reactor has been speculated on (Khushab-V). Space-based surveillance has not turned up signs that work has begun yet on any fifth plutonium reactor at Khushab, although construction of major facilities continues.

== Heavy water production ==
Heavy water (or deuterium oxide, D^{2}O) is important for plutonium production since it is often used moderator in reactor that uses natural uranium.

The Khushab Complex was designed to meet heavy water requirements for running the operations at the Karachi Nuclear Power Plant, and other reactors in the complex. However, the civil engineering works and fuel cycle technology developed at the Kundian Nuclear Fuel Complex lessen the dependence on heavy water from Khushab.

According to the Institute for Science and International Security, the heavy water plant at Khushab Complex is estimated to be able to produce between 50 and 100 metric tons of heavy water per year. The heavy water produced at Khushab is used only for Pakistan's internal and defense-related research activities.

== Reception ==
In 1980s and 1990s, the constructions and the building of the Khushab Nuclear Complex attracted the United States attention, due to mainly the concerns of the knowledge and technology being proliferated to the U.S. adversaries, particularly Iran or India.

Responding to the U.S. concerns in 1995, the PAEC later clarified and insisted in an interview given to the Urdu language, Daily Jang, that Khushab Nuclear Complex had no military spectrum and was not meant to produce weapons-grade plutonium.

== See also ==
- Munir Ahmad Khan
- Khushab
- Jauharabad
