= Abdul Qadeer Khan =

Pakistani nuclear physicist (1936–2021)

Abdul Qadeer Khan NI & BAR HI FPAS
- ڈاکٹر عبدالقدیر خان
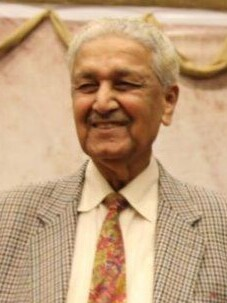
- Khan in 2017

Science Advisor to the Presidential Secretariat
- In office 1 January 2001 – 31 January 2004
- President: Pervez Musharraf
- Preceded by: Ishfaq Ahmad
- Succeeded by: Atta-ur-Rahman

Personal details
- Born: 1 April 1936 Bhopal, Bhopal State, British India
- Died: 10 October 2021 (aged 85) Islamabad, Pakistan
- Resting place: Islamabad Graveyard H-8, Islamabad 33°41′11.7″N 73°3′52.5″E
- Party: Tehreek-e-Tahaffuz-e-Pakistan (2012–2013)
- Spouse: Hendrina Reterink (m. 1963)
- Children: 2
- Education: University of Karachi; Delft University of Technology; Catholic University of Louvain; D. J. Sindh Government Science College
- Known for: Pakistan's nuclear weapons program, gaseous diffusion, martensite and graphene morphology
- Awards: Nishan-i-Imtiaz (1996; 1999); Hilal-i-Imtiaz (1989)
- Website: draqkhan.com.pk (archived)
- Scientific career
- Fields: Metallurgical engineering
- Workplaces: Khan Research Laboratories; GIK Institute of Technology; Hamdard University; Urenco Group
- Thesis: The effect of morphology on the strength of copper-based martensites (1972)
- Doctoral advisor: Martin J. Brabers

Abdul Qadeer Khan (Note: /ˈɑːbdəl ˈkɑːdɪər ˈkɑːn/ AHB-dəl KAH-deer KAHN; Urdu: عبد القدیر خان) NI & BAR, HI, FPAS (1 April 1936 – 10 October 2021) was a Pakistani nuclear physicist and metallurgical engineer. He is colloquially known as the "father of Pakistan's atomic weapons program". (Note: Though other people such as Munir Ahmad Khan and Zulfikar Ali Bhutto have also been accorded that title. Khan has also been titled Mohsin-e-Pakistan (lit. 'Protector of Pakistan') by the local media.)

A Muhajir emigrant from Bhopal, India who migrated to Pakistan in 1952, Khan was educated in the metallurgical engineering departments of Western European technical universities where he pioneered studies in phase transitions of metallic alloys, uranium metallurgy, and isotope separation based on gas centrifuges. After learning of India's "Smiling Buddha" nuclear test in 1974, Khan joined his nation's clandestine efforts to develop atomic weapons when he founded the Khan Research Laboratories (KRL) in 1976 and was both its chief scientist and director for many years.

In January 2004, Khan was subjected to a debriefing by the Musharraf administration over evidence of nuclear proliferation handed to them by the Bush administration of the United States. Khan admitted his role in running a nuclear proliferation network – only to retract his statements in later years when he leveled accusations at the former administration of Pakistan's Prime Minister Benazir Bhutto in 1990, and also directed allegations at President Musharraf over the controversy in 2008. Khan was accused of selling nuclear secrets illegally and was put under house arrest in 2004. After years of house arrest, Khan successfully filed a lawsuit against the Government of Pakistan at the Islamabad High Court whose verdict declared his debriefing unconstitutional and freed him from house arrest on 6 February 2009. The United States reacted negatively to the verdict and the Obama administration issued an official statement warning that Khan still remained a "serious proliferation risk".

On account of the knowledge of nuclear espionage by Khan and his contribution to nuclear proliferation throughout the world post-1970s, and the renewed fear of weapons of mass destruction in the hands of terrorists after the September 11 attacks, former CIA Director George Tenet described Khan as "at least as dangerous as Osama bin Laden". After his death on 10 October 2021, he was given a state funeral at Faisal Mosque before being buried at the H-8 graveyard in Islamabad.

== Early life and education ==
Abdul Qadeer Khan was born on 1 April 1936, in Bhopal, a city in the erstwhile British Indian princely state of Bhopal. He was of Urdu-speaking Muhajir origin. Khan provided conflicting details regarding his family background. While addressing a convocation in 2019, he stated that he belonged to an Orakzai family long settled in Bhopal; he also wrote at another occasion in Jang that his maternal lineage was from Tirah Valley while from his paternal side, his ancestor was an Uzbek soldier who came to India with Muhammad of Ghor, the 12th-century conqueror. This ancestral link inspired Khan to later name a ballistic missile the Ghauri; in 1994–95, Khan would have a mausoleum built over the grave of Muhammad Ghori situated in Dhamiak village around 80 kilometres from Islamabad. At a 2014 event marking the publishing of a book on the history of Khanzada Rajputs, Abdul Qadeer Khan asserted that he belonged to Khanzada community although his family adopted the surname "Khan" instead of "Khanzada".

His father, Abdul Ghafoor, was a schoolteacher who once worked for the Ministry of Education, and his mother, Zulekha, was a housewife with a very religious mindset. His older siblings, along with other family members, had emigrated to Pakistan during the partition of British India in 1947, who would often write to Khan's parents about the new life they had found in Pakistan.

After his matriculation from a local school in Bhopal, in 1952 Khan emigrated from India to Pakistan on the Sind Mail train, partly due to the reservation politics at that time, and religious violence in India during his youth left an indelible impression on his world view. Upon settling in Karachi with his family, Khan briefly attended the D. J. Science College before transferring to the University of Karachi, where he graduated in 1956 with a Bachelor of Science (BSc) in physics with a concentration on solid-state physics.

From 1956 to 1959, Khan was employed by the Karachi Metropolitan Corporation (city government) as an inspector of weights and measures. During this time, he applied for a scholarship that allowed him to study in West Germany. In 1961, Khan departed for West Germany to study material science at the Technical University in West Berlin, where he academically excelled in courses in metallurgy, but left West Berlin when he switched to the Delft University of Technology in the Netherlands in 1965.

In 1962, while on vacation in The Hague, he met Hendrina "Henny" Reterink, a British passport holder, who had been born in South Africa to Dutch expatriates. She spoke Dutch and had spent her childhood in Africa before returning with her parents to the Netherlands, where she lived as a registered foreigner. In 1963, he married Henny in a modest Muslim ceremony at Pakistan's embassy in The Hague. Khan and Henny together had two daughters, Dina Khan, who is a doctor, and Ayesha Khan.

In 1967, Khan obtained an engineer's degree in materials technology – an equivalent to a Master of Science (MS) offered in English-speaking nations such as Pakistan – and joined the doctoral program in metallurgical engineering at the Katholieke Universiteit Leuven in Belgium. He worked under Belgian professor Martin J. Brabers at Leuven University, who supervised his doctoral thesis which Khan successfully defended, and graduated with a DEng in metallurgical engineering in 1972. His thesis included fundamental work on martensite, and its extended industrial applications in the field of graphene morphology.

== Career in Europe ==
In 1972, Khan joined the Physics Dynamics Research Laboratory (or in Dutch: FDO), an engineering firm subsidiary of Verenigde Machinefabrieken (VMF) based in Amsterdam, from Brabers's recommendation. The FDO was a subcontractor for Ultra-Centrifuge Nederland of the British-German-Dutch uranium enrichment consortium, URENCO Group, which was operating an uranium enrichment plant in Almelo, and employed gaseous centrifuge method to assure a supply of nuclear fuel for nuclear power plants in the Netherlands. Soon after, Khan left FDO, but was consequently offered a senior technical position by URENCO, initially conducting studies on uranium metallurgy.

Uranium enrichment is an extremely difficult process because uranium in its natural state is composed of just 0.71% of uranium-235 (U^{235}), which is a fissile material, 99.3% of uranium-238 (U^{238}), which is non-fissile, and 0.0055% of uranium-234 (U^{234}), a daughter product which is also a non-fissile. The URENCO Group utilised the Zippe-type of centrifugal method to electromagnetically separate the isotopes U^{234}, U^{235}, and U^{238} from sublimed raw uranium by rotating the uranium hexafluoride (UF_{6}) gas at up to ~100,000 revolutions per minute (rpm). Khan, whose work was based on physical metallurgy of the uranium metal, eventually dedicated his investigations to improving the efficiency of the centrifuges by 1973–74.

Frits Veerman, Khan's colleague at FDO, uncovered nuclear espionage at Almelo where Khan had stolen designs of the centrifuges from URENCO for the nuclear weapons programme of Pakistan. Veerman became aware of the espionage when Khan had taken classified URENCO documents home to be copied and translated by his Dutch-speaking wife and had asked Veerman to photograph some of them. In 1975, Khan was transferred to a less sensitive section when URENCO became suspicious and he subsequently returned to Pakistan with his wife and two daughters. Khan was sentenced in absentia to four years in prison in 1983 by the Netherlands for espionage, but the conviction was later overturned due to a legal technicality. Ruud Lubbers, Prime Minister of the Netherlands at the time, later said that the General Intelligence and Security Service (BVD) was aware of Khan's espionage activities, but he was allowed to continue due to pressure from the CIA; with the US backing Pakistan during the Cold War. This was also highlighted when despite Archie Pervez (Khan's associate for nuclear procurement in the US) being convicted in 1988, no action was taken against Khan or his proliferation network by the US government which needed the support of Pakistan during the Soviet–Afghan War.

Henk Slebos, a Dutch engineer and businessman, who had studied metallurgy with Khan at the Delft University of Technology, continued providing goods needed for enriching uranium to Khan in Pakistan through his company Slebos Research. Slebos was sentenced in 1985 to one year in prison, but the sentence was reduced on appeal in 1986 to six months of probation and a fine of 20,000 guilders. Though Slebos continued to export goods to Pakistan, and was again sentenced to one year in prison and a fine of around €100,000 was imposed on his company.

Ernst Piffl was convicted and sentenced to three and a half years in prison by Germany in 1998 for supplying nuclear centrifuge parts through his company Team GmbH to Khan's Khan Research Laboratories in Kahuta.

Asher Karni, a Hungarian-South African businessman, was sentenced to three years in prison in the US for the sale of restricted nuclear equipment to Pakistan through Humayun Khan (an associate of Khan) and his Pakland PME Corporation.

== Scientific career in Pakistan ==
=== Smiling Buddha and initiation ===
Upon learning of India's surprise nuclear test, 'Smiling Buddha', in May 1974, Khan wanted to contribute to efforts to build an atomic bomb and met with officials at the Pakistani Embassy in The Hague, who dissuaded him by saying it was "hard to find" a job in PAEC as a "metallurgist". In August 1974, Khan wrote a letter which went unnoticed, but he directed another letter through the Pakistani ambassador to the Prime Minister's Secretariat in September 1974.

Unbeknownst to Khan, his nation's scientists were already working towards feasibility of the atomic bomb under a secretive crash weapons program since 20 January 1972 that was being directed by Munir Ahmad Khan, a reactor physicist, which calls into question of his "father-of" claim. After reading his letter, Prime Minister Zulfikar Ali Bhutto had his military secretary run a security check on Khan, who was unknown at that time, for verification and asked PAEC to dispatch a team under Sultan Bashiruddin Mahmood that met Khan at his family home in Almelo and forwarded Bhutto's letter which instructed Qadeer Khan to meet the Prime Minister in Islamabad. Upon arriving in December 1974, Khan took a taxi straight to the Prime Minister's Secretariat. He met with Prime Minister Bhutto in the presence of Ghulam Ishaq Khan, Agha Shahi, and Mubashir Hassan where he explained the significance of highly enriched uranium, with the meeting ending with Bhutto's remark: "He seems to make sense."

The next day, Khan met with Munir Ahmad and other senior scientists where he focused the discussion on production of highly enriched uranium (HEU), against weapon-grade plutonium, and explained to Bhutto why he thought the idea of "plutonium" would not work. Later, Khan was advised by several officials in the Bhutto administration to remain in the Netherlands to learn more about centrifuge technology but continue to provide consultation on the Project-706 enrichment program led by Mahmood. By December 1975, Khan was given a transfer to a less sensitive section when URENCO became suspicious of his indiscreet open sessions with Mahmood to instruct him on centrifuge technology. Khan began to fear for his safety in the Netherlands, ultimately insisting on returning home.

=== Khan Research Laboratories and atomic bomb program ===
Diagram of the principles of a Zippe-type gas centrifuge with U-238 represented in dark blue and U-235 represented in light blue

In April 1976, Khan joined the atomic bomb program and became part of the enrichment division, initially collaborating with Khalil Qureshi – a physical chemist. Calculations performed by him were invaluable contributions to centrifuges and a vital link to nuclear weapon research, but he continued to push for his ideas for feasibility of weapon-grade uranium even though it had a low priority, with most efforts still aimed to produce military-grade plutonium. Because of his interest in uranium metallurgy and his frustration at having been passed over for director of the uranium division (the job was instead given to Bashiruddin Mahmood), Khan refused to engage in further calculations and caused tensions with other researchers. Khan became highly unsatisfied and bored with the research led by Mahmood – finally, he submitted a critical report to Bhutto, in which he explained that the "enrichment program" was nowhere near success.

Upon reviewing the report, Bhutto sensed a great danger as the scientists were split between military-grade uranium and plutonium and informed Khan to take over the enrichment division from Mahmood, who separated the program from PAEC by founding the Engineering Research Laboratories (ERL). The ERL functioned directly under the Army's Corps of Engineers, with Khan being its chief scientist, and the army engineers located the national site at isolated lands in Kahuta for the enrichment program as ideal site for preventing accidents.

The PAEC did not forgo their electromagnetic isotope separation program, and a parallel program was led by Ghulam Dastagir Alam at the Air Research Laboratories (ARL) located at Chaklala Airbase, even though Alam had not seen a centrifuge, and only had a rudimentary knowledge of the Manhattan Project. During this time, Alam accomplished a great feat by perfectly balancing the rotation of the first generation of centrifuge to ~30,000 rpm and was immediately dispatched to ERL which was suffering from many setbacks in setting up its own program under Khan's direction based on centrifuge technology dependent on URENCO's methods. Khan eventually committed to work on problems involving the differential equations concerning the rotation around fixed axis to perfectly balance the machine under influence of gravity and the design of first generation of centrifuges became functional after Khan and Alam succeeded in separating the ^{235}U and ^{238}U isotopes from raw natural uranium.

In the military circles, Khan's scientific ability was well recognised and was often known with his moniker "Centrifuge Khan" and the national laboratory was renamed after him upon the visit of President Muhammad Zia-ul-Haq in 1983. In spite of his role, Khan was never in charge of the actual designs of the nuclear devices, their calculations, and eventual weapons testing which remained under the directorship of Munir Ahmad Khan and the PAEC.

The PAEC's senior scientists who worked with him and under him remember him as "an egomaniacal lightweight" given to exaggerating his scientific achievements in centrifuges. At one point, Munir Khan said that, "most of the scientists who work on the development of atomic bomb projects were extremely 'serious'. They were sobered by the weight of what they don't know; Abdul Qadeer Khan is a showman." During the timeline of the bomb program, Khan published papers on analytical mechanics of balancing of rotating masses and thermodynamics with mathematical rigour to compete, but still failed to impress his fellow theorists at PAEC, generally in the physics community. In later years, Khan became a staunch critic of Munir Khan's research in physics, and on many occasions tried unsuccessfully to belittle Munir Khan's role in the atomic bomb projects. Their scientific rivalry became public and widely popular in the physics community and seminars held in the country over the years.

=== Nuclear tests: Chagai-I ===
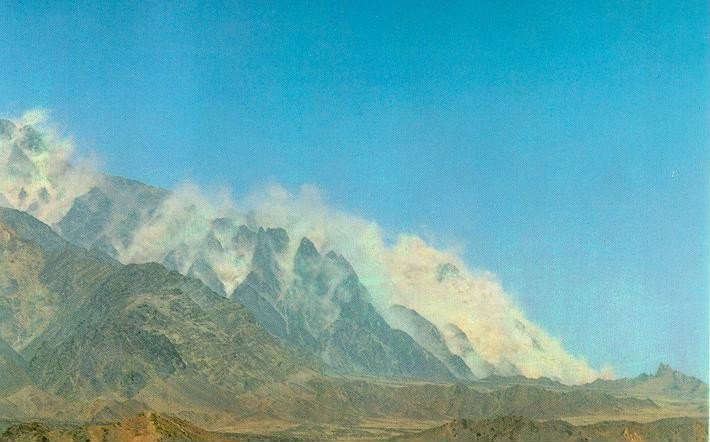
Visible effect of the nuclear weapons test, Chagai-I, conducted in the Ras Koh Hills of the Sulaiman Mountains, May 1998. All five nuclear devices were boosted fission devices that used highly enriched uranium.

Many of his theorists were unsure that military-grade uranium would be feasible on time without the centrifuges, since Alam had notified PAEC that the "blueprints were incomplete" and "lacked the scientific information needed even for the basic gas-centrifuges". Calculations by Tasneem Shah, and confirmed by Alam, showed that Khan's earlier estimation of the quantity of uranium needing enrichment for the production of weapon-grade uranium was possible, even with the small number of centrifuges deployed.

Khan produced the designs of the centrifuges from URENCO. However, they were riddled with serious technical errors, and while he bought some components for analysis, they were broken pieces, making them useless for quick assembly of a centrifuge. Its separative work unit (SWU) rate was extremely low, so that it would have to be rotated for thousands of RPMs at the cost of millions of taxpayers money, Alam maintained. Though Khan's knowledge of copper metallurgy greatly aided the innovation of centrifuges, it was the calculations and validation that came from his team of fellow theorists, including mathematician Tasneem Shah and Alam, who solved the differential equations concerning rotation around a fixed axis under the influence of gravity, which led Khan to come up with the innovative centrifuge designs.

Diagram of the gun-type device developed by the United States

Scientists have said that Khan would have never got any closer to success without the assistance of Alam and others. The issue is controversial; Khan maintained to his biographer that when it came to defending the "centrifuge approach" and really putting work into it, both Shah and Alam refused.

Khan was also very critical of PAEC's concentrated efforts towards developing a plutonium 'implosion-type' nuclear devices and provided strong advocacy for the relatively simple 'gun-type' device that only had to work with high-enriched uranium – a design concept of gun-type device he eventually submitted to Ministry of Energy (MoE) and Ministry of Defense (MoD). Khan downplayed the importance of plutonium despite many of the theorists maintaining that "plutonium and the fuel cycle has its significance", and he insisted on the uranium route to the Bhutto administration when France's offer for an extraction plant was in the offing.

Though he had helped to come up with the centrifuge designs, and had been a long-time proponent of the concept, Khan was not chosen to head the development project to test his nation's first nuclear-weapons (his reputation of a thorny personality likely played a role in this) after India conducted its series of nuclear tests, 'Pokhran-II' in 1998. Intervention by the Chairman Joint Chiefs, General Jehangir Karamat, allowed Khan to be a participant and eye-witness his nation's first nuclear test, 'Chagai-I' in 1998. At a news conference, Khan confirmed the testing of the boosted fission devices while stating that it was KRL's highly enriched uranium (HEU) that was used in the detonation of Pakistan's first nuclear devices on 28 May 1998.

Many of Khan's colleagues were irritated that he seemed to enjoy taking full credit for something he had only a small part in, and in response, he authored an article, "Torch-Bearers", which appeared in The News International, emphasising that he was not alone in the weapon's development. He made an attempt to work on the Teller–Ulam design for the hydrogen bomb, but the military strategists had objected to the idea as it went against the government's policy of minimum credible deterrence. Khan often got engrossed in projects which were theoretically interesting but practically unfeasible.

== Proliferation controversy ==
In the 1970s, Khan had been very vocal about establishing a network to acquire imported electronic materials from the Dutch firms and had very little trust of PAEC's domestic manufacturing of materials, despite the government accepting PAEC's arguments for the long term sustainability of the nuclear weapons program. At one point, Khan reached out to the People's Republic of China to acquire uranium hexafluoride (UF_{6}) when he attended a conference there – the Pakistani Government sent it back to the People's Republic of China, asking KRL to use the UF_{6} supplied by PAEC. In an investigative report published by Nuclear Threat Initiative, Chinese scientists were reportedly present at Khan Research Laboratories (KRL) in Kahuta in the early 1980s. In 1996, the US intelligence community maintained that China provided magnetic rings for special suspension bearings mounted at the top of rotating centrifuge cylinders. In 2005, it was revealed that President Zia-ul-Haq's military government had KRL run a HEU programme in the Chinese nuclear weapons program. Khan said that "KRL has built a centrifuge facility for China in Hanzhong city". China also exported some of DF-11's ballistic missile technology to Pakistan, where Pakistan's Ghaznavi and Shaheen-II borrowed from DF-11 technology.

In 1982, an unnamed Arab country reached out to Khan for the sale of centrifuge technology. Khan was very receptive to the financial offer, but one scientist alerted the Zia administration which investigated the matter, only for Khan to vehemently deny such an offer was made to him. The Zia administration tasked Major-General Ali Nawab, an engineering officer, to keep surveillance on Khan, which he did until 1983 when he retired from his military service, and Khan's activities went undetected for several years after.

=== Court controversy and US objections ===
In 1979, the Dutch government eventually probed Khan on suspicion of nuclear espionage but he was not prosecuted due to lack of evidence, though it did file a criminal complaint against him in a local court in Amsterdam, which sentenced him in absentia in 1985 to four years in prison. Upon learning of the sentence, Khan filed an appeal through his attorney, S. M. Zafar, who teamed up with the administration of Leuven University, and successfully argued that the technical information requested by Khan was commonly found and taught in undergraduate and doctoral physics at the university – the court exonerated Khan by overturning his sentence on a legal technicality. Reacting to the suspicions of espionage, Khan stressed that: "I had requested for it as we had no library of our own at KRL, at that time. All the research work [at Kahuta] was the result of our innovation and struggle. We did not receive any technical 'know-how' from abroad, but we cannot reject the use of books, magazines, and research papers in this connection."

In 1979, the Zia administration, which was making an effort to keep their nuclear capability discreet to avoid pressure from the Reagan administration of the United States (US), nearly lost its patience with Khan when he reportedly attempted to meet with a local journalist to announce the existence of the enrichment program. During the Indian Operation Brasstacks military exercise in 1987, Khan gave another interview to local press and stated: "the Americans had been well aware of the success of the atomic quest of Pakistan", allegedly confirming the speculation of technology export. At both instances, the Zia administration sharply denied Khan's statement and a furious President Zia met with Khan and used a "tough tone", promising Khan severe repercussions had he not retracted all of his statements, which Khan immediately did by contacting several news correspondents.

In 1996, Khan again appeared on his country's news channels and maintained that "at no stage was the program of producing 90% weapons-grade enriched uranium ever stopped", despite Benazir Bhutto's administration reaching an understanding with the United States Clinton administration to cap the program to 3% enrichment in 1990.

=== North Korea, Iran, and Libya ===
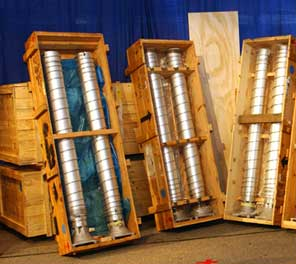
The centrifuges removed from Libya by the United States as seen in the image were developed by Khan, known as P1, when he worked for URENCO in the 1970s.

The innovation and improved designs of centrifuges were marked as classified for export restriction by the Pakistan government, though Khan was still in possession of earlier designs of centrifuges from when he worked for URENCO in the 1970s. In 1990, the United States alleged that highly sensitive information was being exported to North Korea in exchange for rocket engines. Pakistan's Ghauri missile was based entirely on North Korea's Rodong-1 as reflected in its technology. The project was supported by Benazir Bhutto who consulted for the project with North Korea and facilitated the technology transfer to Khan Research Laboratories in 1993.

On multiple occasions, Khan levelled accusations against Benazir Bhutto's administration of providing secret enrichment information, on a compact disc (CD), to North Korea; these accusations were denied by Benazir Bhutto's staff and military personnel.

Between 1987 and 1989, Khan secretly leaked knowledge of centrifuges to Iran without notifying the Pakistan Government, although this issue is a subject of political controversy. In 2003, the European Union pressured Iran to accept tougher inspections of its nuclear program and the International Atomic Energy Agency (IAEA) revealed an enrichment facility in the city of Natanz, Iran, utilising gas centrifuges based on the designs and methods used by URENCO. The IAEA inspectors quickly identified the centrifuges as P-1 types, which had been obtained "from a foreign intermediary in 1989", and the Iranian negotiators turned over the names of their suppliers, which identified Khan as one of them. Heinz Mebus, a German engineer and businessman and college friend of Khan, was named as one of the suppliers - acting as a middleman for Khan.

In May 1998, Newsweek reported that Khan had sent Iraq centrifuge designs, which were apparently confiscated by the UNMOVIC officials. Iraqi officials said "the documents were authentic but that they had not agreed to work with A. Q. Khan, fearing an ISI sting operation, due to strained relations between two countries.

On 7 June 1998, 10 days after Pakistan's first underground nuclear test, there was yet another incident according to Foreign Policy. Kim Sa Nae, wife of a midlevel North Korean "diplomat", who was invited by Khan as part of a 20-member delegation was shot to death a few yards from Khan's official residence after she was suspected to be a spy for the United States by the ISI that subsequently informed the North Korean authorities. Privately, some Pakistani intelligence sources leaked this information to the Los Angeles Times. 3 days after Kim's death, both P-1 and P-2 centrifuges, warheads, and technical data, along with Kim's body, were flown to North Korea in the same American made C-130 cargo plane that was making rounds between Pakistan and North Korea from 1997-2002.

In 2003, merchant vessel BBC China was caught carrying nuclear centrifuges to Libya from Malaysia, the Scomi Group and Khan Research Laboratories were supplying nuclear parts to Libya through Khan's Dubai-based Sri Lankan associate Buhary Syed Abu Tahir. This was further revealed in the Scomi Precision Engineering nuclear scandal surrounding Scomi CEO Shah Hakim Zain and Kamaluddin Abdullah, son of former Malaysian Prime Minister Abdullah Ahmad Badawi.

In 2005, when Vladimir Putin raised concerns about Pakistan's proliferation network and nuclear transfers to Iran with George W. Bush, the latter said he had pressured Pervez Musharraf on the issue, stating: "I told him we’re worried about transfers to Iran and North Korea. They put A.Q. Khan in jail; and some of his buddies under house arrest. We want to know what they said. I keep reminding Musharraf of that. Either he’s getting nothing or he’s not being forthcoming," reflecting doubts.

Libya negotiated with the United States to roll back its nuclear program to have economic sanctions lifted, effected by the Iran and Libya Sanctions Act, and shipped centrifuges to the United States that were identified as P-1 models by the American inspectors. Ultimately, the Bush administration launched its investigation of Khan, focusing on his personal role, when Libya handed over a list of its suppliers. Friedrich Tinner, a nuclear engineer and friend of Khan since their days at the Leuven University, was one of the heads of Libya's nuclear programme and worked in nuclear enrichment for Libya and Pakistan. In 2008, German nuclear engineer Gotthard Lerch was convicted and sentenced to five years and six months in prison for procuring centrifuges for Libya from Khan, Lerch also acted as Khan's middleman for Iran. Alfred Hempel, a German businessman, arranged the shipment of gas centrifuge parts from Khan in Pakistan to Libya and Iran via Dubai.

The "A.Q. Khan network" involved numerous shell companies set-up by Khan in Dubai to obtain equipment necessary for nuclear enrichment. From 1999 onwards, Khan travelled to Dubai 41 times according to the Pakistan government. Khan also kept a penthouse on posh al-Maktoum Road. The shell companies consisting of "a fax machine and an empty office" would be used to facilitate shipments and shut down immediately after the deals. Shahid Bagheri Industrial Group of Iran's Defense Industries Organization was involved in nuclear proliferation for Iran and North Korea through China. Parts needed for nuclear enrichment in Pakistan were also imported by Khan from several Japanese companies.

=== Security hearings, pardon, and aftermath ===
Starting in 2001, Khan served as an adviser on science and technology in the Musharraf administration and had become a public figure who enjoyed much support from his country's political conservative sphere. In 2003, the Bush administration reportedly turned over evidence of a nuclear proliferation network that implicated Khan's role to the Musharraf administration. Khan was dismissed from his post on 31 January 2004. On 4 February 2004, Khan appeared on Pakistan Television (PTV) and confessed to running a proliferation ring, and transferring technology to Iran between 1989 and 1991, and to North Korea and Libya between 1991 and 1997. The Musharraf administration avoided arresting Khan but launched security hearings on Khan who confessed to the military investigators that former Chief of Army Staff General Mirza Aslam Beg had given authorisation for technology transfer to Iran.

On 5 February 2004, President Pervez Musharraf issued a pardon to Khan as he feared that the issue would be politicised by his political rivals. Despite the pardon, Khan, who had strong conservative support, had badly damaged the political credibility of the Musharraf administration and the image of the United States who was attempting to win hearts and minds of local populations during the height of the Insurgency in Khyber Pakhtunkhwa. While the local television news media aired sympathetic documentaries on Khan, the opposition parties in the country protested so strongly that the US Embassy in Islamabad had pointed out to the Bush administration that the successor to Musharraf could be less friendly towards the United States. This restrained the Bush administration from applying further direct pressure on Musharraf due to a strategic calculation that it might cause the loss of Musharraf as an ally. In December 2006, the Weapons of Mass Destruction Commission (WMDC), headed by Hans Blix, stated that Khan could not have acted alone "without the awareness of the Pakistan Government". Blix's statement was also reciprocated by the United States government, with one anonymous American government intelligence official quoted by independent journalist and author Seymour Hersh: "Suppose if Edward Teller had suddenly decided to spread nuclear technology around the world. Could he really do that without the American government knowing?".

In 2007, the US and European Commission politicians as well as IAEA officials had made several strong calls to have Khan interrogated by IAEA investigators, given the lingering scepticism about the disclosures made by Pakistan, but Prime Minister Shaukat Aziz, who remained supportive of Khan and spoke highly of him, strongly dismissed the calls by terming it as "case closed".

In 2008, the security hearings were officially terminated by Chairman joint chiefs General Tariq Majid who marked the details of debriefings as "classified". In 2008, in an interview, Khan laid the whole blame on former President Pervez Musharraf, and labelled Musharraf as the "Big Boss" for proliferation deals. In 2012, Khan also implicated Benazir Bhutto's administration in proliferation matters, pointing to the fact as she had issued "clear directions in thi[s] regard." Khan also said that he was persecuted because he was a Muhajir.

== Government work, academia, and political advocacy ==
Khan's strong advocacy for nuclear sharing of technology eventually led to his ostracisation by much of the scientific community, but Khan was still quite welcome in his country's political and military circles. After leaving the directorship of the Khan Research Laboratories in 2001, Khan briefly joined the Musharraf administration as a policy adviser on science and technology on a request from President Musharraf. In this capacity, Khan promoted increased defence spending on his nation's missile program to counter the perceived threats from the Indian missile program and advised the Musharraf administration on space policy. He presented the idea of using the Ghauri missile system as an expendable launch system to launch satellites into space.

At the height of the proliferation controversy in 2007, Khan was paid tribute by Prime Minister Shaukat Aziz on state television while commenting in the last part of his speech, Aziz stressed: "The services of [nuclear] scientist ... Dr. [Abdul] Qadeer Khan are "unforgettable" for the country".

In the 1990s, Khan secured a fellowship with the Pakistan Academy of Sciences – he served as its president in 1996–97. Khan published two books on material science and started publishing his articles from KRL in the 1980s. Gopal S. Upadhyaya, an Indian metallurgist who attended Khan's conference and met him along with Kuldip Nayar, reportedly described him as being a proud Pakistani who wanted to show the world that scientists from Pakistan are inferior to no one in the world. Khan also served as project director of Ghulam Ishaq Khan Institute of Engineering Sciences and Technology and briefly tenured as professor of physics before joining the faculty of the Hamdard University; where he remained on the board of directors of the university up until his death in 2021. Later, Khan helped established the A. Q. Khan Institute of Biotechnology and Genetic Engineering at Karachi University.

In 2012, Khan announced the formation of a conservative political advocacy group, Tehreek-e-Tahaffuz-e-Pakistan ('Movement for the Protection of Pakistan'). It was subsequently dissolved in 2013.

== Personal life ==
Khan met his wife, Henny, in the Netherlands during his early years in Europe, and the two later married. She supported his major life decisions, including his return to Pakistan in 1975, where they settled and raised their family. Khan maintained a strong religious outlook and frequently reflected on issues affecting Muslim communities worldwide, writing on such matters in his columns. Alongside these interests, he remained engaged with scientific subjects, particularly physics and chemistry, and took a general interest in scientific ideas such as theoretical developments and the history of science. He was known for his sociable nature and hospitality, often hosting friends and serving traditional dishes such as paya (trotter stew), daal (lentils), and bhindi (okra). He also had a fondness for animals, keeping pets and feeding local wildlife near his home in Islamabad.

== Illness and death ==
In August 2021, Khan was admitted to Khan Research Laboratories Hospital after testing positive for COVID-19. Khan died on 10 October 2021, at the age of 85, after being transferred to a hospital in Islamabad with lung problems. He was given a state funeral at the Faisal Mosque before being buried at the H-8 graveyard in Islamabad.

The Prime Minister of Pakistan, Imran Khan, expressed grief over his death in a tweet adding that "for the people of Pakistan he was a national icon". President of Pakistan Arif Alvi also expressed sadness adding that "a grateful nation will never forget his services".

== Legacy ==
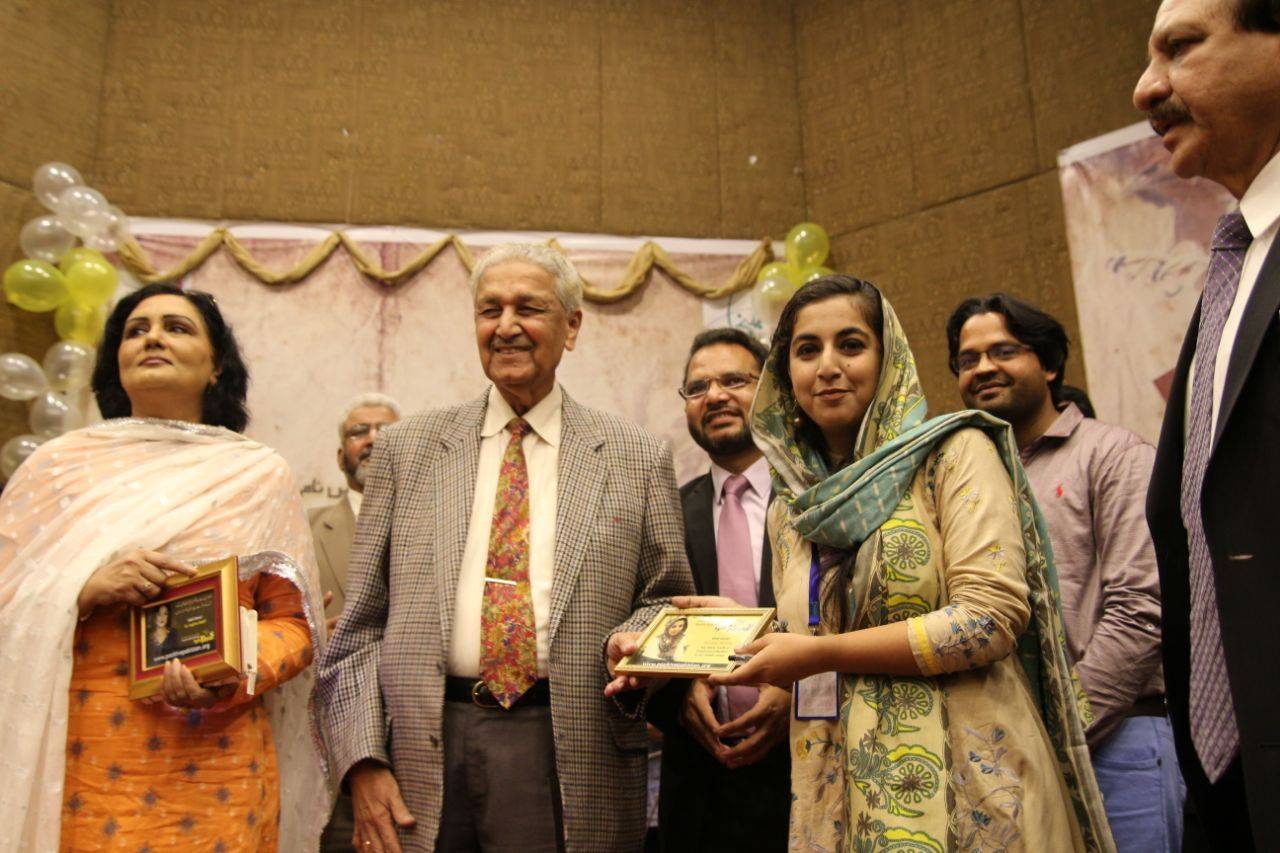
Khan attending literary conference with members of a civic society in 2017. Despite controversy, Khan remained a popular public figure.

During his time in the atomic bomb project, Khan pioneered research in the thermal quantum field theory and condensed matter physics, while he co-authored articles on chemical reactions of the highly unstable isotope particles in the controlled physical system. He maintained his stance of the use of controversial technological solutions to both military and civilian problems, including the use of military technologies for civilian welfare. Khan also remained a vigorous advocate for a nuclear testing program and defence strength through nuclear weapons. He justified Pakistan's nuclear deterrence program as sparing his country the fate of Iraq or Libya. In an interview in 2011, Khan maintained his stance on peace through strength and vigorously defended the nuclear weapons program as part of the deterrence policy:

[P]akistan's motivation for nuclear weapons arose from a need to prevent "nuclear blackmail" by India. Had Iraq and Libya been nuclear powers, they wouldn't have been destroyed in the way we have seen recently. ... If (Pakistan) had an [atomic] capability before 1971, we [Pakistanis] would not have lost half of our country after a disgraceful defeat.

— Abdul Qadeer Khan, statement on 16 May 2011, published in Newsweek

During his work on the nuclear weapons program and onwards, Khan faced heated and intense criticism from his fellow theorists, most notably Pervez Hoodbhoy who contested his scientific understanding in quantum physics. In addition, Khan's false claims that he was the "father" of the atomic bomb project since its inception and his personal attacks on Munir Ahmad Khan caused even greater animosity from his fellow theorists, and most particularly, within the general physics community, such as the Pakistan Physics Society.

Various motivations have been cited for Khan's role in the proliferation of nuclear weapons. According to the editor-in-chief of Foreign Policy, Moisés Naím, although his actions were certainly ideological or political in nature, Khan's motives remain essentially financial. This is evidenced, according to him, by his commercial manoeuvres, his presence in North Korean trade as well as his real estate ownerships. For instance, Khan owned the Hendrina Khan Hotel in Timbuktu, named after his wife. It was one of dozens of his commercial enterprises. To build his hotel in Timbuktu, he reportedly used a Pakistan Air Force C-130 transport aircraft in the early 2000s to transport carved wooden furniture. The plane landed at Tripoli Airport in Libya and the cargo was then taken to Timbuktu by road as it was unable to land in Mali. Khan himself accompanied the furniture from Islamabad. His wife, two daughters and brother Abdul Quyuim Khan were all named in the Panama Papers in 2016 as owners of Wahdat Ltd., an offshore company registered in the Bahamas.

Bruno Tertrais, a senior researcher at the Foundation for Strategic Research states: "Khan's motivations were complex and evolving (...) The primary motivation seems to have been to ensure the legitimacy of his role in building Pakistan's nuclear force (...) The second motivation, which has become more important over time, is personal enrichment. Finally, the third important element of varying importance depending on the hypothesis: Khan's more or less diffuse desire to see other Muslim countries access nuclear power."

In spite of the proliferation controversy and his volatile personality, Khan remained a popular public figure and has been as a symbol of national pride with many in Pakistan who see him as a national hero. While Khan has been bestowed with many medals and honours by the federal government and universities in Pakistan, Khan also remains the only citizen of Pakistan to have been honoured twice with the Nishan-e-Imtiaz.

- Nishan-e-Imtiaz (1999)
- Nishan-e-Imtiaz (1996)
- Hilal-e-Imtiaz (1989)
- Sir Syed University of Engineering and Technology
- 60 Gold medal from universities in the country.
- University of Karachi
- Baqai Medical University
- Hamdard University
- Gomal University
- University of Engineering and Technology, Lahore

== Published works ==
In addition to his scientific career, Khan authored several non-scientific works in English and in Urdu, primarily consisting of newspaper columns and reflective writings on politics, society, and Islam. His most prominent publications include the multi-volume Sehar Honay Tak (سحر ہونے تک), a collection of columns addressing social and political issues in Pakistan, as well as Dastan-e-Azam (داستان عزم), an autobiographical work.

=== Selected research papers and patents ===
==== Nuclear and material physics ====
- Dilation investigation of metallic phase transformation in 18% Ni maraging steels, Proceedings of the International Conf. on Martensitic Transformations (1986), The Japan Institute of Metals, pp. 560–565.
- The spread of Nuclear weapons among nations: Militarization or Development, pp. 417–430. (Ref. Nuclear War Nuclear Proliferation and their consequences "Proceedings of the 5th International Colloquium organised by the Group De Bellerive Geneva 27–29 June 1985", Edited by: Sadruddin Aga Khan, Published by Clarendon Press-Oxford 1986).
- Flow-induced vibrations in Gas-tube assembly of centrifuges. Journal of Nuclear Science and Technology, 23(9) (September 1986), pp. 819–827.
- Dimensional anisotropy in 18% of maraging steel, Seven National Symposium on Frontiers in Physics, written with Anwar-ul-Haq, Mohammad Farooq, S. Qaisar, published at the Pakistan Physics Society (1998).
- Thermodynamics of Non-equilibrium phases in Electron-beam rapid solidification, Proceedings of the Second National Symposium on Frontiers in Physics, written with A. Tauqeer, Fakhar Hashmi, publisher Pakistan Physics Society (1988).

=== Books ===
- Khan, Abdul Qadeer (1972). Advances in Physical Metallurgy (in English, German, and Dutch). Amsterdam, Netherlands: Elsevier Press.
- Khan, Abdul Qadeer (1983). Metallurgical Thermodynamics and Kinetics (in English, German, and Dutch). Islamabad, Pakistan: The Proceedings of the Pakistan Academy of Sciences.
- Khan, Abdul Qadeer; Hussain, Syed Shabbir; Kamran, Mujahid (1997). Dr. A.Q. Khan on science and education. Islamabad, Pakistan: Sang-e-Meel Publications. ISBN 978-969-35-0821-5.

== See also ==
- Dr. A. Q. Khan Institute of Computer Sciences and Information Technology
- Dr. A. Q. Khan Research Laboratories
- Pakistani missile research and development program
- Conservatism in Pakistan
- Nuclear espionage
- Nuclear arms race
- Nuclear Secrets, 2007 documentary series about the nuclear race and proliferation including Khan's role therein
- Anwar Ali (physicist), Pakistani physicist charged with nuclear proliferation
- Peter Finke, German physicist in the nuclear weapons programme of Pakistan

== Notes ==
Government offices
Preceded by Ishfaq Ahmad	Science Advisor to the Presidential Secretariat; 1 January 2001 – 31 January 2004	Succeeded by Atta ur Rahman
