= Mechanical device test stands =

A mechanical device test stand is one specific type of test stand. It is a facility used to develop, characterize and test mechanical components. The facility allows for the testing of the component and, it offers measurement of several physical variables associated to the functionality of the component. Such components could be electromechanical, motors or tools. The intended use of the test stand is for compliance testing of predetermined desired values and fatigue testing. A sophisticated mechanical component test stand houses several integrated measurement and control (imc) components, such as sensors, data acquisition devices and actuators to control the component. The sensors measure several physical variables, such as:

- Strain/multi-axial strain
- Mechanical stress
- Rigidity/stiffness
- Angle
- Vibration/oscillation signals

Information gathered from the sensors is processed and logged through the use of data acquisition systems. Actuators allow for attaining a desired state. Test stands for mechanical devices are often custom-built according to the requirements of the customer. They often include a feedback control system.

== Applications for mechanical device test stands ==
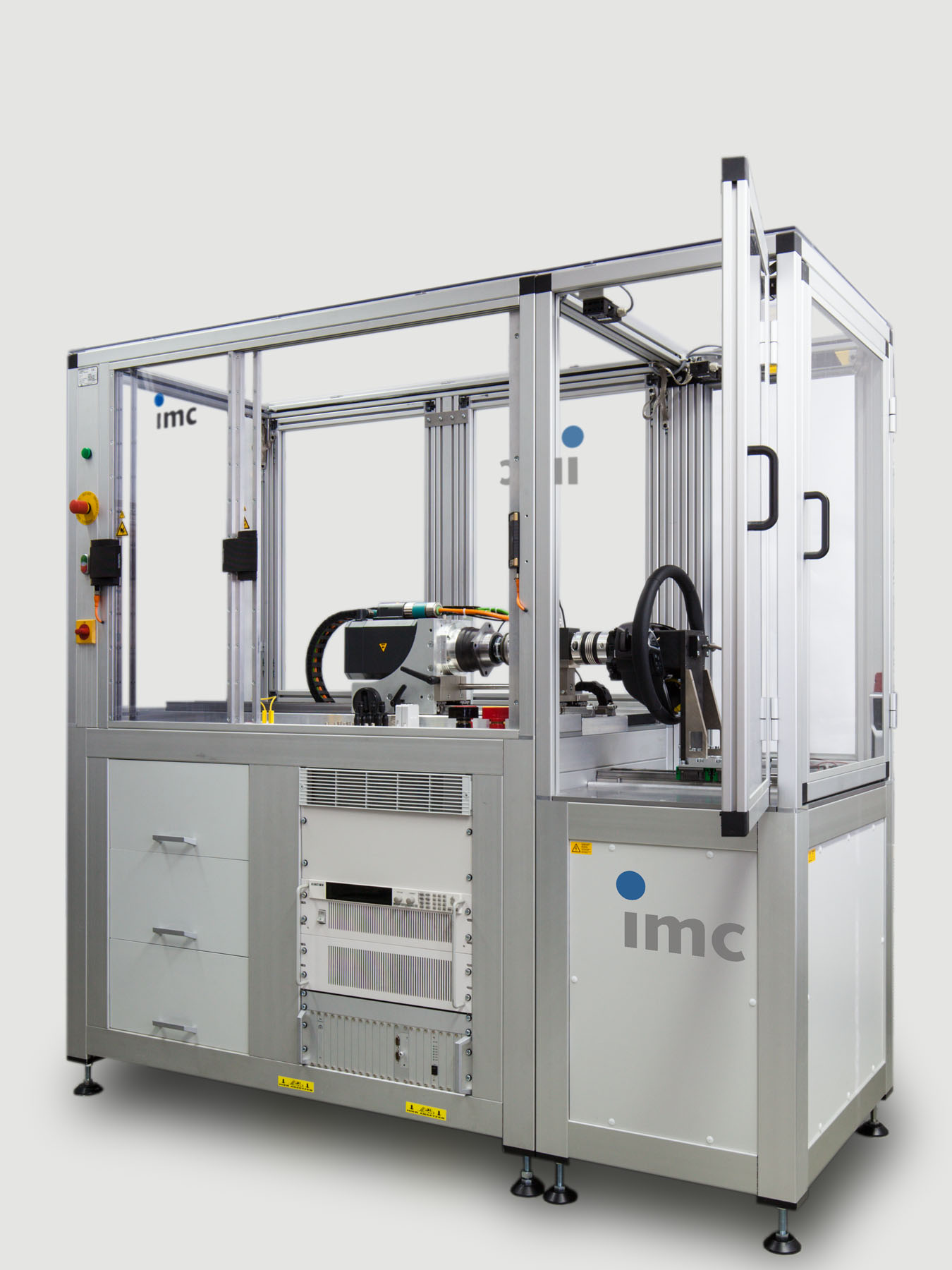
imc steering wheel test stand

- Research and Development of components, motors and tools (e.g., the testing of sun roofs, engine hoods, welding equipment. etc.), typically found in factory environments.
- End of production line at an OEM factory. Changing of tested components can take place automatically.

== Mechanical device testing for research and development ==
Research and Development (R&D) activities on mechanical components have necessitated sophisticated mechanical component test stands. For example, automobile OEMs or aviation OEMs are usually interested in developing mechanical components that meet the following objectives:

- Provide high durability
- High efficiency
- High performance/quality
- Keep costs down

Consequently, R&D mechanical component test stands perform a variety of exercises including measurement, control and recording of several relevant engine variables.

Typical tests include

- Determine efficiency
- Structural analysis
- Determine durability: e.g., aging tests
- Gain further knowledge about the mechanical component
- Fourier analysis
- Order analysis
- Fatigue analysis

== See also ==
- engine test stand
- electric motor test stand
