= Khalil Qureshi =

Pakistani scientist

- Born: Lahore, Punjab
- Citizenship: Pakistan
- Education: Punjab University; Imperial College London
- Known for: Work in physical chemistry, explosive forming, nuclear energy, and Pakistan's nuclear deterrence program.
- Awards: Hilal-i-Imtiaz (2003); Sitara-i-Imtiaz (1999)
- Scientific career
- Fields: Physical Chemistry
- Workplaces: Pakistan Atomic Energy Commission; Punjab University; London University; Lahore University of Management Sciences
- Thesis: Physico-chemical studies of the vapour deposition of alumina (1972)
- Doctoral advisor: David Craig

Khalil Ahmad Qureshi (Urdu: خليل احمد قريشى; HI, SI), is a Pakistani physical chemist and the professor of physical chemistry at the Punjab University. He has published notable papers in nuclear physical chemistry in international scientific journals as well contributing in the advancement of the scientific applications of the civilian usage of the fuel cycle.

== Early life and education ==
A native of Lahore, Qureshi subsequently attended the Punjab University to study chemistry where he graduated with BSc in chemistry. For his higher studies, he went to United Kingdom to attend Imperial College London. He earned MSc in Chemical Technology and worked towards gaining the DIC in physical metallurgy. At the Imperial College, he joined the doctoral group led by Thomas West and David Craig. He earned his PhD in physical chemistry under the supervision of David Craig, writing his thesis on Physico-chemical studies of the vapour deposition of Al_{2}O_{3}, in 1972.

== Career ==
=== Pakistan Atomic Energy Commission ===
He briefly taught physical chemistry at the London University before moving to Pakistan. Upon his return, he joined the Pakistan Atomic Energy Commission (PAEC) and took the professorship of nuclear chemistry at the Pakistan Institute of Nuclear Science and Technology (PINSTECH). Subsequently, he joined the clandestine atomic bomb project's chemistry section led by fellow chemist Iqbal Hussain Qureshi.

Munir Ahmad Khan, chairman PAEC, had him partially take over the "R-Labs" at PAEC to engage research in chemical explosives. Initially, the research was concentrated towards development of the HMX, a non-toxic explosive that was produced as a by-product of the RDX process. In the 1970s, he founded the Metallurgical Laboratory (ML) where he also moved majority of the staff to undertake research in metallurgy. He then led a team of chemists who supervised the physical conversion of UF_{6} into solid metal before coating and machining the metal. During this time, he also led the research on using chemical and metallurgical industrial techniques and reduction furnaces to produce metal from the Highly enriched uranium. Due to the sensitivity of the project and concerns of fellow theorist Dr. AQ Khan, the program was moved to KRL in the 1980s.

=== Research and science activism ===
While at PAEC, Qureshi joined the chemistry department of Quaid-e-Azam University as an associate professor. In the 1990s, he joined the Punjab University to teach post-graduate course on physical chemistry. In the 2000s, he joined the Lahore University of Management Sciences's School of Science and Engineering as director of engineering and safety.

Over the years, he became known for his strong scientific advocacy of peaceful usage of nuclear energy, safety, and security, following the Fukushima disaster. A member of Khwarizmi Science Society, he has lectured on safety issues regarded the nuclear power and topics in nuclear chemistry. He has also authored numerous articles on chemical safety and securities around the world in world's leading research journal. In 2011, he lectured on physical chemistry and spoke about how nuclear technology was being used currently and different ways of disposing nuclear waste at the Forman Christian College University in Lahore. He is the recipient of Pakistan's highest honours– the Hilal-i-Imtiaz bestowed in 2003 and the Sitara-e-Imtiaz bestowed in 1999 by the Government of Pakistan.
