= Hailin Wang =

Chinese American Physicist born c. 1964

- Born: c. 1963; China
- Awards: American Physical Society Fellow; Fellow of the Optical Society of America
- Scientific career
- Thesis: High-resolution nonlinear laser spectroscopy of exciton relaxation in gallium arsenide semiconductors (1990)
- Doctoral advisor: Duncan Steel

Hailin Wang (born about 1963) is a physicist on the faculty of the University of Oregon who researches experimental condensed matter physics. He studies optical interactions in artificially engineered semiconductor nanostructures. His interests also include "quantum optics with spins, excitons, and nanomechanical oscillators, quantum information processing."

== Early life and education ==
Hailin Wang received a B.S. degree in physics in 1982 from the University of Science and Technology of China in Hefei, and he earned a Ph.D. from the University of Michigan in 1990. His dissertation, titled High-resolution nonlinear laser spectroscopy of exciton relaxation in gallium arsenide semiconductors, was advised by Duncan Steel.

== Career ==
Wang served as research investigator at the University of Michigan and then as a staff consultant at AT&T Bell Laboratories. Wang joined the UO faculty in 1995. He holds the Alec and Kay Keith Chair in Physics.

Wang's research on optical interactions has included artificially engineered semiconductor nanostructures. He has researched electromagnetically induced transparency, showing that an opaque semiconductor material can be made transparent using "quantum mechanical interface processes". Understanding these optical processes may lead to alternative ways information is processed, transmitted and stored.

Wang has served as principal investigator for two National Science Foundation grants: Cavity QED of Spins in Diamond via Dark States, and Mechanically Mediated Spin Entanglement in Diamond.

As director of the Oregon Center for Optics, Wang also led efforts to expand optics education beyond the physics curriculum, including an optics internship at the master's level, as well as a summer Optics Camp for middle- and high-school students.

Wangs serves on the Executive Committee of the Division of Laser Science of the American Physical Society.

== Selected Articles ==
- Dong, Chunhua; Fiore, Victor; Kuzyk, Mark C.; Wang, Hailin (2012-12-21). "Optomechanical Dark Mode". Science. 338 (6114): 1609–1613. doi:10.1126/science.1228370. ISSN 0036-8075.
- Park, Young-Shin; Cook, Andrew K.; Wang, Hailin (2006-09-01). "Cavity QED with Diamond Nanocrystals and Silica Microspheres". Nano Letters. 6 (9): 2075–2079. arXiv:cond-mat/0608493. doi:10.1021/nl061342r. ISSN 1530-6984.
- Wang, Hailin; Ferrio, Kyle; Steel, Duncan G.; Hu, Y. Z.; Binder, R.; Koch, S. W. (1993-08-23). "Transient nonlinear optical response from excitation induced dephasing in GaAs". Physical Review Letters. 71 (8): 1261–1264. doi:10.1103/PhysRevLett.71.1261.
- Kim, JunHwan; Kuzyk, Mark C.; Han, Kewen; Wang, Hailin; Bahl, Gaurav (March 2015). "Non-reciprocal Brillouin scattering induced transparency". Nature Physics. 11 (3): 275–280. arXiv:1408.1739. doi:10.1038/nphys3236. ISSN 1745-2481.
- Ku, Pei-Cheng; Sedgwick, Forrest; Chang-Hasnain, Connie J.; Palinginis, Phedon; Li, Tao; Wang, Hailin; Chang, Shu-Wei; Chuang, Shun-Lien (2004-10-01). "Slow light in semiconductor quantum wells". Optics Letters. 29 (19): 2291–2293. doi:10.1364/OL.29.002291. ISSN 1539-4794.
- Fiore, Victor; Yang, Yong; Kuzyk, Mark C.; Barbour, Russell; Tian, Lin; Wang, Hailin (2011-09-19). "Storing Optical Information as a Mechanical Excitation in a Silica Optomechanical Resonator". Physical Review Letters. 107 (13) 133601. arXiv:1106.4512. doi:10.1103/PhysRevLett.107.133601.
- Park, Young-Shin; Wang, Hailin (July 2009). "Resolved-sideband and cryogenic cooling of an optomechanical resonator". Nature Physics. 5 (7): 489–493. doi:10.1038/nphys1303. ISSN 1745-2481.
- Delsing, Per; Cleland, Andrew N.; Schuetz, Martin J. A.; Knörzer, Johannes; Giedke, Géza; Cirac, J. Ignacio; Srinivasan, Kartik; Wu, Marcelo; Balram, Krishna Coimbatore; Bäuerle, Christopher; Meunier, Tristan; Ford, Christopher J. B.; Santos, Paulo V.; Cerda-Méndez, Edgar; Wang, Hailin (July 2019). "The 2019 surface acoustic waves roadmap". Journal of Physics D: Applied Physics. 52 (35): 353001. doi:10.1088/1361-6463/ab1b04. hdl:21.11116/0000-0004-8393-1. ISSN 0022-3727.
- Golter, D. Andrew; Oo, Thein; Amezcua, Mayra; Stewart, Kevin A.; Wang, Hailin (2016-04-07). "Optomechanical Quantum Control of a Nitrogen-Vacancy Center in Diamond". Physical Review Letters. 116 (14) 143602. arXiv:1603.03804. doi:10.1103/PhysRevLett.116.143602.
- Phillips, Mark C.; Wang, Hailin; Rumyantsev, I.; Kwong, N. H.; Takayama, R.; Binder, R. (2003-10-31). "Electromagnetically Induced Transparency in Semiconductors via Biexciton Coherence". Physical Review Letters. 91 (18) 183602. doi:10.1103/PhysRevLett.91.183602.
- Tian, L.; Wang, Hailin (2010-11-09). "Optical wavelength conversion of quantum states with optomechanics". Physical Review A. 82 (5) 053806. arXiv:1007.1687. doi:10.1103/PhysRevA.82.053806.

== Patent ==
- US patent 9594267, Bahl, Gaurav; Kim, Junhwan & Wang, Hailin et al., "System and method for brillouin scattering induced transparency", published 2017-03-14.

== Awards, honors ==
- 2020 NSF Career Award
- 2009 Oregon Faculty ExcellenceAward
- 2006 American Physical Society Fellow, cited "for contributions to the study of coherent optical processes in semiconductors, especially the pioneering experimental work on electromagnetically induced transparency via exciton correlations."
- 2005 Fellow of the Optical Society of America, cited "for research on quantum optical processes in semiconductors, in particular electromagnetically induced transparency via exciton correlations, and cavity QED with nanocrystals".
