= Graphene morphology =

Any of the structures related to and formed from single sheets of graphene

A graphene morphology is any of the structures related to, and formed from, single sheets of graphene. 'Graphene' is typically used to refer to the crystalline monolayer of the naturally occurring material graphite. Due to quantum confinement of electrons within the material at these low dimensions, small differences in graphene morphology can greatly impact the physical and chemical properties of these materials. Commonly studied graphene morphologies include the monolayer sheets, bilayer sheets, graphene nanoribbons and other 3D structures formed from stacking of the monolayer sheets.

== Monolayer sheets ==
In 2013 researchers developed a production unit that produces continuous monolayer sheets of high-strength monolayer graphene (HSMG). The process is based on graphene growth on a liquid metal matrix.

== Bilayer ==
Bilayer graphene displays the anomalous quantum Hall effect, a tunable band gap and potential for excitonic condensation. Bilayer graphene typically can be found either in twisted configurations where the two layers are rotated relative to each other or graphitic Bernal stacked configurations where half the atoms in one layer lie atop half the atoms in the other. Stacking order and orientation govern its optical and electronic properties.

One synthesis method is chemical vapor deposition, which can produce large bilayer regions that almost exclusively conform to a Bernal stack geometry.

== Superlattices ==
Periodically stacked graphene and its insulating isomorph provide a fascinating structural element in implementing highly functional superlattices at the atomic scale, which offers possibilities in designing nanoelectronic and photonic devices. Various types of superlattices can be obtained by stacking graphene and its related forms. The energy band in layer-stacked superlattices is more sensitive to the barrier width than that in conventional III–V semiconductor superlattices. When adding more than one atomic layer to the barrier in each period, the coupling of electronic wavefunctions in neighboring potential wells can be significantly reduced, which leads to the degeneration of continuous subbands into quantized energy levels. When varying the well width, the energy levels in the potential wells along the L–M direction behave distinctly from those along the K–H direction.

Precisely aligned graphene on h-BN always produces giant superlattice known as Moiré pattern. Moiré patterns are observed and the sensitivity of moiré interferometry proves that the graphene grains can align precisely with the underlying h-BN lattice within an error of less than 0.05°. The occurrence of moiré pattern clearly indicates that the graphene locks into h-BN via van der Waals epitaxy with its interfacial stress greatly released.

The existence of the giant Moiré pattern in graphene nanoribbon (GNR) embedded in hBN indicates that the graphene was highly crystalline and precisely aligned with the h-BN underneath. It was noticed that the Moiré pattern appeared to be stretched along the GNR, while it appeared relaxed laterally. This trend differs from regular hexagons with a periodicity of ~14 nm, which have always been observed with well-aligned graphene domains on h-BN. This observation gives a strong indication of the in-plane epitaxy between the graphene and the h-BN at the edges of the trench, where the graphene is stretched by tensile strain along the ribbon, due to a lattice mismatch between the graphene and h-BN.

== Nanoribbons ==
Graphene nanoribbons ("nanostripes" in the "zig-zag" orientation), at low temperatures, show spin-polarized metallic edge currents, which suggest spintronics applications. (In the "armchair" orientation, the edges behave like semiconductors.)

== Fiber ==
In 2011 researchers reported making fibers using chemical vapor deposition grown graphene films. The method was scalable and controllable, delivering tunable morphology and pore structure by controlling the evaporation of solvents with suitable surface tension. Flexible all-solid-state supercapacitors based on such fibers were demonstrated in 2013.

In 2015 researchers reported intercalating small graphene fragments into the gaps formed by larger, coiled graphene sheets. After annealing, the large sheets provided pathways for conduction while the fragments helped reinforce the fibers. The resulting fibers offered better thermal and electrical conductivity and mechanical strength. Thermal conductivity reached 1290 watts per meter per kelvin, while tensile strength reached 1080 megapascals.

In 2016 kilometer-scale continuous graphene fibers with outstanding mechanical properties and excellent electrical conductivity were produced by high-throughput wet-spinning of graphene oxide liquid crystals followed by graphitization through a full-scale synergetic defect-engineering strategy.

== 3D ==
Three dimensional bilayer graphene was reported in 2012 and 2014.

In 2013 a three-dimensional honeycomb of hexagonally arranged carbon was termed 3D graphene. Self-supporting 3D graphene was produced that year. Researchers at Stony Brook University have reported a novel radical-initiated crosslinking method to fabricate porous 3D free-standing architectures of graphene and carbon nanotubes using nanomaterials as building blocks without any polymer matrix as support. 3D structures can be fabricated by using either CVD or solution-based methods. A 2016 review summarized the techniques for fabrication of 3D graphene and other related two-dimensional materials. These 3D graphene (all-carbon) scaffolds/foams have potential applications in fields such as energy storage, filtration, thermal management and biomedical devices and implants.

In 2016 a box-shaped graphene (BSG) nanostructure resulted from mechanical cleavage of pyrolytic graphite has been reported. The discovered nanostructure is a multilayer system of parallel hollow nanochannels located along the surface that displayed quadrangular cross-section. The thickness of the channel walls is approximately equal to 1 nm, the typical width of channel facets makes about 25 nm. Potential applications include: ultra-sensitive detectors, high-performance catalytic cells, nanochannels for DNA sequencing and manipulation, high-performance heat sinking surfaces, rechargeable batteries of enhanced performance, nanomechanical resonators, electron multiplication channels in emission nanoelectronic devices, high-capacity sorbents for safe hydrogen storage.

Gyroid

In 2017 researchers simulated a graphene gyroid that has five percent of the density of steel, yet is ten times as strong with an enormous surface area to volume ratio. They compressed heated graphene flakes. They then constructed high resolution 3D-printed models of plastic of various configurations – similar to the gyroids that graphene form naturally, though thousands of times larger. These shapes were then tested for tensile strength and compression, and compared to the computer simulations. When the graphene was swapped out for polymers or metals, similar gains in strength were seen.

A film of graphene soaked in solvent to make it swell and become malleable was overlaid on an underlying substrate "former". The solvent evaporated, leaving behind a layer of graphene that had taken on the shape of the underlying structure. In this way the team was able to produce a range of relatively intricate micro-structured shapes. Features vary from 3.5 to 50 μm. Pure graphene and gold-decorated graphene were each successfully integrated with the substrate.

An aerogel made of graphene layers separated by carbon nanotubes was measured at 0.16 milligrams per cubic centimeter. A solution of graphene and carbon nanotubes in a mold is freeze dried to dehydrate the solution, leaving the aerogel. The material has superior elasticity and absorption. It can recover completely after more than 90% compression, and absorb up to 900 times its weight in oil, at a rate of 68.8 grams per second.

At the end of 2017 fabrication of freestanding graphene gyroids with 35nm and 60nm unit cells was reported. The gyroids were made via controlled direct chemical vapor deposition and are self-supporting and can be transferred onto a variety of substrates. Furthermore, they represent the smallest free standing periodic graphene 3D structures yet produced with a pore size of tens of nm. Due to their high mechanical strength, good conductivity (sheet resistance : 240 Ω/sq) and huge ratio of surface area per volume, the graphene gyroids might find their way to various applications, ranging from batteries and supercapacitors to filtration and optoelectronics.

== Pillared ==
Pillared graphene is a hybrid carbon structure consisting of an oriented array of carbon nanotubes connected at each end to a graphene sheet. It was first described theoretically in 2008. Pillared graphene has not been synthesized in the laboratory.

== Reinforced ==
Graphene sheets reinforced with embedded carbon nanotubes ("rebar") are easier to manipulate, while improving the electrical and mechanical qualities of both materials.

Functionalized single- or multiwalled carbon nanotubes are spin-coated on copper foils and then heated and cooled, using the nanotubes as the carbon source. Under heating, the functional carbon groups decompose into graphene, while the nanotubes partially split and form in-plane covalent bonds with the graphene, adding strength. π–π stacking domains add more strength. The nanotubes can overlap, making the material a better conductor than standard CVD-grown graphene. The nanotubes effectively bridge the grain boundaries found in conventional graphene. The technique eliminates the traces of substrate on which later-separated sheets were deposited using epitaxy.

Stacks of a few layers have been proposed as a cost-effective and physically flexible replacement for indium tin oxide (ITO) used in displays and photovoltaic cells.

== Nanocoil ==
In 2015 a coiled form of graphene was discovered in graphitic carbon (coal). The spiraling effect is produced by defects in the material's hexagonal grid that causes it to spiral along its edge, mimicking a Riemann surface, with the graphene surface approximately perpendicular to the axis. When voltage is applied to such a coil, current flows around the spiral, producing a magnetic field. The phenomenon applies to spirals with either zigzag or armchair orientations, although with different current distributions. Computer simulations indicated that a conventional spiral inductor of 205 microns in diameter could be matched by a nanocoil just 70 nanometers wide, with a field strength reaching as much as 1 tesla, about the same as the coils found in typical loudspeakers, about the same field strength as some MRI machines. They found the magnetic field would be strongest in the hollow, nanometer-wide cavity at the spiral's center.

A solenoid made with such a coil behaves as a quantum conductor whose current distribution between the core and exterior varies with applied voltage, resulting in nonlinear inductance.
