= Electric motor test stand =

Test bench for electric motors

An electric motor (E-motor) test stand (also referred to as a bench) is a test stand for reproducible testing of electric motors. In addition to the mechanical design, an electric motor test stand consists of accompanying measurement devices, sensors, and application software. The bus systems used to control and monitor the test objects are also included in the test stand. There are a variety of different types of test stands, such as developmental test stands, endurance test stands, end-of-line (EoL) test stands, and hardware-in-the-loop (HiL) test stands.

== General ==
Testing of electric motors is generally done to determine characteristic curve points or entire characteristic curves. There is also additional testing that is done to characterize the electromagnetic behavior of the test object: e.g., generative measurements, measurements of cogging torque, and discharge measurements.

== Operational modes ==
=== Classic testing ===
A typical test setup includes a load machine, clutch, and torque transducer. An externally applied load is used to strain, i.e., load, the motor. Using this method, simple characteristics can be directly mechanically acquired and the derived variables calculated. From the input current and input voltage, the absorbed power can also be recorded. Similarly, from the rpm and torque output values, the mechanical power output can be determined, and thus, the efficiency of the motor.

==== Advantages ====
- Testing of different types of motors can be realized
- No change to the test algorithm is necessary
- After adapting, further tests are easily implemented

==== Disadvantages ====
- Mechanical modifications are necessary for each motor or shaft change
- Systematic errors in the test sequence are possible if the tests are incorrectly parameterized
- Time-consuming adapting of test objects to the test stand before testing can take place

=== Parameter identification method ===
Using the test object-s own inertia to dynamically run through the characteristic curve: This method tests electric motors without a mechanical coupling and without torque and speed measurements. The test is carried out via the terminal voltage and current values. The parameters are determined by means of mathematical models.

==== Advantages ====
- Simple design
- Fast test methods
- Adapting for different motor types is not necessary
- Only current and voltage are measured
- No measurement of mechanical quantities

==== Disadvantages ====
- Model adapting for different motor types

=== Other testing ===
==== Drone brushless motor testing ====
Brushless motors are often used as a propulsion component for UAS (Unmanned Aerial System). In order to optimize your flight time or lift capacity, the brushless motor should be carefully selected by testing it. Different tests can be executed such as endurance testing, flight replays, reliability testing, or pass/fail tests for quality control. Tyto Robotics Inc. is the main manufacturer of test stands specialized for UAS propulsion testing.

==== Noise analysis ====
A noise analysis is performed by means of a suitable excitation function. The test function should be selected so that all the forces that produce noise can be analyzed by respective sensors. The most common sources of noise are rolling bearings, commutators, and electric forces.

==== Regenerative testing ====
Electrical machines, which are energized and driven from the outside, induce a voltage which can be measured on the connection lines of the machine. The induced voltage is proportional to the speed and excitation. The course of the induced voltage gives information about the windings and the characteristics of the excitement around the circumference. The measurement of the induced voltage provides a simple method to diagnose the electromagnetic behavior of the motor. Regularities are derived from a moving conductor loop in a constant magnetic field.

==== Measuring the cogging torque ====
In rotating electrical machines, the number of poles in the rotor multiplied by the number of strands in the stator equals the number of preferred stable positions in which the rotor moves. The amount of cogging torque is significantly influenced by the structural design. Regardless of the type of measurement, the load machine drives the currentless test object. The cogging torque is measured with a torque transducer connected between the test object and the load machine. The cogging torque can be determined in two different ways: Measurement of the cogging torque at slow speed or measurement of the cogging torque with closed-loop position control. For both measurements, an active load machine is required to drive the test object.

== See also ==
- Test bay

== Literature ==
- Prof. Dr.-Ing Klaus Metzger (Hrsg):Prüfung von Elektromotoren, imc Meßsysteme GmbH, 2010, ISBN 978-3-00-027178-6
