= BBC China =

History
- Name: Beluga Superstition (2001); BBC China (2002–2004)
- Port of registry: (Antigua and Barbuda) Antigua & Barbuda
- Builder: Qingshan Shipyard, Wuhan, China
- Laid down: 28 February 2000
- Launched: 4 November 2000
- Completed: 4 July 2001
- Identification: IMO number: 9219082
- Fate: Ran aground off South African coast on 16 October 2004

General characteristics
- Type: Cargo ship
- Tonnage: 5,548 GT; 6,500 DWT
- Length: 122.2 m (400 ft 11 in) (oa); 117.3 m (384 ft 10 in) (pp)
- Beam: 18.5 m (60 ft 8 in)
- Propulsion: Diesel engine, one shaft
- Speed: 16.5 knots (30.6 km/h; 19.0 mph)

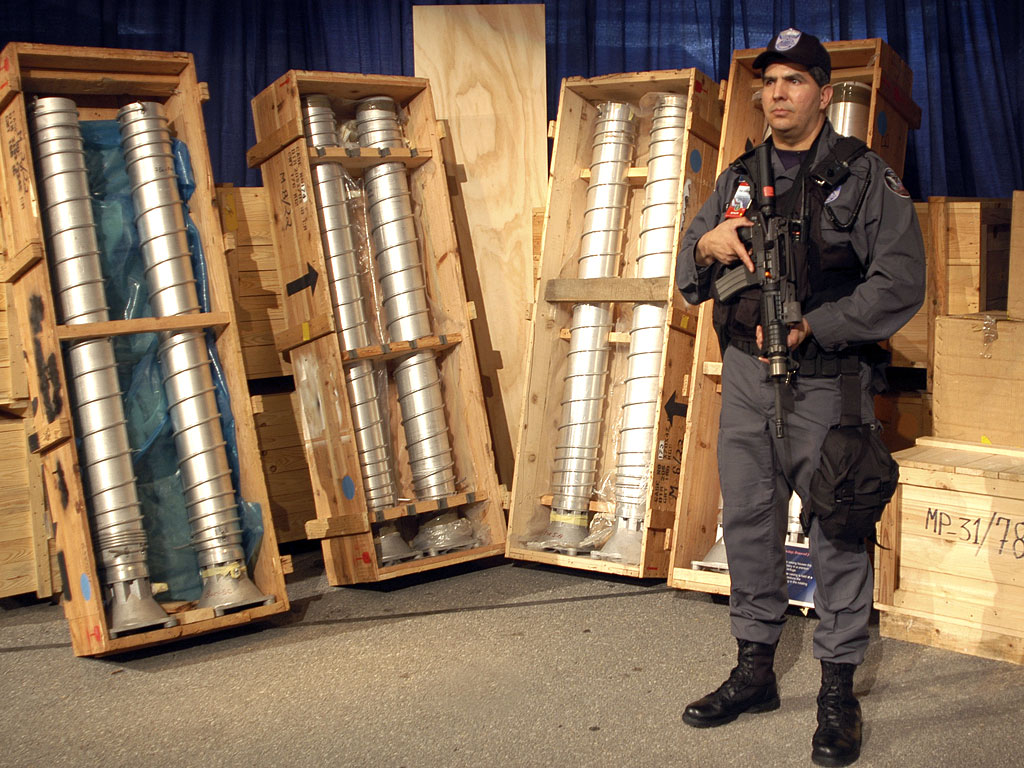
Gas centrifuges for uranium enrichment recovered from BBC China in Italy, en route to Libya in 2003

MV BBC China was a 5,548 GT general cargo vessel constructed in China that was completed in 2000. The ship was initially named Beluga Superstition, being renamed in 2002. The vessel gained notoriety after it was caught carrying gas centrifuges for uranium enrichment to Libya in 2003. In 2004, the vessel ran aground off the coast of South Africa. The wreck was subsequently demolished with explosives.

== Description ==
BBC China was a cargo ship measured at 5,548 gross tonnage (GT) and 6,500 tons deadweight (DWT). The vessel was 122.2 metres (400 ft 11 in) long overall and 117.3 m (384 ft 10 in) between perpendiculars with a beam of 18.5 m (60 ft 8 in). The ship was powered by a diesel engine turning one shaft. BBC China had a maximum speed of 16.5 knots (30.6 km/h; 19.0 mph).

== Construction and career ==
The cargo ship's keel was laid down at Qingshan Shipyard in Wuhan, China on 28 February 2000. While under construction the ship was named Beluga Superstition. The vessel was launched on 4 November 2000 and was completed on 4 July 2001. On 1 October 2002, the ship was renamed BBC China. BBC China was operated by Beluga Shipping GMBH of Bremen, Germany, and flagged in Antigua & Barbuda.

In October 2003 the ship was diverted to Italy while carrying gas centrifuges and nuclear components for uranium enrichment from Scomi Precision Engineering and A. Q. Khan's Khan Research Laboratories via Dubai to Libya. With the aid of the German shipping company and the German government, the vessel was redirected to Italy, where US government personnel boarded the vessel and discovered the centrifuges, which had not been on the vessel's manifest.

BBC China, while sailing from Durban, South Africa to Spain, ran aground near Port Grosvenor at 31.3851960°S 29.9076156°E on 16 October 2004. The vessel was declared constructive total loss and subsequently demolished with explosives.

== See also ==
- Libya and weapons of mass destruction
- Abdul Qadeer Khan
- Scomi Precision Engineering nuclear scandal
