= Frits Veerman =

Dutch whistleblower (1944–2021)

- Born: 1944; Huizen
- Died: 23 February 2021 (aged 76); Huizen
- Occupations: Technician, photographer
- Known for: Whistleblowing of nuclear espionage by A. Q. Khan

Frits Veerman (8 November 1944 – 23 February 2021) was a Dutch technician and whistleblower. In the 1970s, Veerman uncovered a large nuclear espionage at Urenco, a producer of enriched uranium in Almelo, the Netherlands.

Veerman noted that his Pakistani colleague at FDO (where Veerman was working as a photographer)—a subsidiary research lab of VMF-Stork contracted to URENCO for building ultracentrifuges—Abdul Qadeer Khan was spying when he was requesting more and more information. At his home he saw all kinds of sensitive information. Khan passed on the sensitive information to Pakistan, allowing the country to develop an atomic bomb. Veerman warned against espionage, but it was not listened to. After his report, Veerman lost his job and his career was over. Veerman wanted reparation from the Dutch government and Stork B.V. (the current incarnation of VMF-Stork). In 2020, after 40 years, he was finally recognized for his actions by the Dutch Whistleblowers Authority. In 2020 a documentary about the aforementioned events premiered.

Veerman died in his hometown Huizen in February 2021, aged 76.
