= Scomi Precision Engineering nuclear scandal =

Syarikat Scomi Precision Engineering Sdn Bhd (SCOPE) was established under the Scomi group of companies controlled by Kamaluddin Abdullah, a businessman. He is the son of former Malaysian Prime Minister Abdullah Ahmad Badawi. On 4 February 2004, the New York Times carried a story claiming that SCOPE supplied nuclear components to Libya as part of a rogue network masterminded by Pakistani atomic weapons supremo Dr. A. Q. Khan. Scomi denied any wrongdoings. However, in 2009, the United States Department of State announced that sanctions would be imposed on Scomi Chief Executive Officer Shah Hakim Zain for his involvement in Dr. Khan's nuclear-proliferation network. Following the US government's sanctions on Shah Hakim, he fought to clear his name in that country and succeeded in 2011. The sanctions were lifted by the US State Department on Monday, 18 July, and the news was covered in Malaysian papers. Shah issued a statement as well, saying: "In reference to the lifting of the sanctions imposed, I am grateful to all who have helped, guided and supported Scomi Group and I for the past few years, in particular to the Government of Malaysia and all the agencies. I would like to express my gratitude to the State of Department, United States of America for their assistance and for the lifting of the sanctions."

== Company profile ==
SCOPE was set up as a subsidiary to Scomi Group on 4 December 2001. Before SCOPE was set up as a subsidiary of Scomi, it was known as Prisma Wibawa Sdn. Bhd. (PWSB). At first, PWSB had no production facility but after SCOPE was set up, a production facility was set up in 2001 in Shah Alam. The General Manager of SCOPE was Shamsul Bahrin Rukiban. In 2001, SCOPE was reported to have secured a contract to supply components to a Dubai-based customer.

In 2002, Scomi CEO, Shah Hakim Zain, was appointed director of SCOPE along with Mansor Tahir and Hilmy Zaini Zainal. In that year, the company had MYR250,000 in paid up capital. Assets of MYR1.5 million, turnover of MYR12 million and profits of MYR1 million.

On 7 January 2005, Scomi Group Bhd proposed to acquire from SCOPE 250,000 ordinary shares of RM1.00 each, representing the entire issued and paid-up share capital of SCOPE for RM250,000 from its wholly owned subsidiary company, Scomi Sdn. Bhd. The control of the net assets and operations of SCOPE was effectively transferred to Scomi Group Bhd and the Group's effective interest in SCOPE remained unchanged at 100%.

== BSA Tahir ==
Soon after the NY Times article, the Malaysian police announced that one of Scomi's main backers, B.S.A. Tahir, had confessed to helping Dr Khan sell nuclear secrets and supplies to Iran and Libya. He was detained without trial from 2006 to 2008, for allegedly being a national security risk, having been accused of fraudulently convincing SCOPE to produce components for centrifuges to be used in Libya's secret uranium enrichment program.

Scomi officials insisted that B.S.A. Tahir had misled them to believe that the parts were intended for the oil and gas industry. However, Tahir is reported to have said that, both Shah Hakim Zain and Kamaluddin knew the final destination of the products. He has accused Scomi of making fraudulent declarations and in 2009 he sued Shah Hakim and Kamaluddin for MYR75 million.

== Japanese involvement ==
On 26 August 2006, the CEO and four executives of the Mitutoyo Corporation were arrested by Tokyo Police in connection with the sale of equipment to Scomi, for the production of the centrifuge. Mitutoyo was also investigated for supplying expertise to SCOPE related to the centrifuge manufacturing project.

== U.S. sanctions ==
On 12 January 2009, the US Department of State announced that sanctions would be imposed on Dr Khan and a number of his alleged associates including BSA Tahir, Scomi CEO, Shah Hakim Zain and SCOPE GM, Shamsul Bahrin, for their involvement in Dr Khan's nuclear proliferation network. These sanctions have the effect of prohibiting Shah Hakim or Shamsul Bahrin from doing business with the US government. However, Scomi itself was not among the companies listed in the sanctions.

== Malaysian government response ==
Given the role of the Prime Minister's son as a major shareholder of Scomi, there were calls for an independent inquiry to be carried out into the allegation of Malaysia's role in Dr. Khan's network, but no such thing happened. Following the 2009 decision to impose sanctions on Shah Hakim, the Malaysian Government announced that it would carry out further investigations into the matter. However, no further announcement has been made.

Malaysia has ratified the Nuclear Non-Proliferation Treaty. Following the breaking of the SCOPE scandal, the Malaysian government promised to tighten controls on exports of weapons-related equipment. However, in 2007 there were further reports that a Malaysian company was involved in the illegal arms trade, this time involving another Pakistani arms dealer, Jilani Humayun. There are no reports of the Malaysian government having taken action against the Malaysian company in either the case of Abdul Qadeer Khan or in the case of Jilani Humayun.

== See also ==
- BBC China, cargo ship caught carrying nuclear components from Malaysia
- Libya and weapons of mass destruction
