= Pakistan Physics Society =

Pakistani interest group for physics

Pakistan Physical Society Pakistan Physics Society
- Abbreviation: PPS
- Predecessor: None
- Formation: January 30, 1987; 39 years ago
- Type: Scientific think tank
- Headquarters: Institute of Physics, Qau
- Location: Islamabad, ICT
- Region served: South Asia; Europe
- Official language: English; Urdu
- General Secretary: Dr. Arshad M. Mirza
- First President: Prof. Dr. Hassan A. Shah
- Second President: Prof. Dr. M Yunus
- Affiliations: American Physics Society

The Pakistan Physical Society, also known as Pakistan Physics Society, (Urdu: پاکستان مصاحبتِ طبیعات) is an academic and professional physics society of Pakistan's academicians and physicists, dedicated for the development and research in physics. It is one of the notable society with one of core objectives including to advise the Government on the matters of science and development. Headquartered at the Institute of Physics, Quaid-e-Azam University, it is a member of Institute of Physics, at the University of Engineering and Technology at Lahore, Punjab Province.

== History ==
In 1974, dr. Abdus Salam, with the help of Munir Ahmad Khan, successfully arranged the International Nathiagali Summer College on Physics and Contemporary Needs at the Nathiagali, North Western Province of Pakistan. This led the creation of Institute of Physics at the University of Engineering and Technology. However, the professional body of scientists was still needed, therefore, physicists from all over the country decided to established a formal body. In 1987, Ghulam Murtaza and Dr. Abdul Hameed Nayyar organized the National Symposium on Frontiers in Physics, on the occasion of Professor Salam's birthday.

With Abdus Salam coming to visit to Pakistan, physicists from all over the country gathered at the Institute of Physics to attend the symposium, first of its kind, to gather and share the knowledge about latest developments in different areas of interest. With Professor Salam spoke and stressed the importance of physics in the country, the multiple recommendations were sent by leading physicists to Dr. Murtaza and Dr. Nayyar to established this symposium as the professional body of physicists. Both took up the responsibility to establish such kind of society, and in March 1990, the government approved the status of the society and got it registered the same year.

== Notable members ==
- Abdus Salam†— Life member
- Riazuddin— Life member, and director of Theoretical Physics Group
- Ghulam Murtaza— founder, director of Plasma Group
- Masud Ahmad— member of Plasma Physics Group
- Ishfaq Ahmad— director of Particle Physics Group
- Pervez Hoodbhoy— member of Particle Physics Group
- Abdul Hameed Nayyar— founder, director of Condensed matter physics group
- Noor Muhammad Butt— former president of PPS, and member of Condensed matter physics group
- Abdul Qadeer Khan— member of Condensed matter physics group
- Asghar Qadir— director of Mathematics Group/
- Munir Ahmad Rashid— member of Mathematics Group.

== Associated organizations ==
- Pakistan Atomic Energy Commission
- Kahuta Research Laboratories
- American Physical Society
