= Tyto Robotics =

Canadian aerospace company

- Type: Private
- Industry: Aerospace
- Founded: 2014
- Founder: Charles Blouin and Dominic Robillard
- Headquarters: Gatineau, Canada
- Website: tytorobotics.com

Tyto Robotics (formerly known as RCbenchmark) is a Canadian aerospace technology company headquartered in Gatineau, Quebec that provides scientific testing equipment and software to global UAV manufacturers and researchers. Engineers and researchers use thrust stands manufactured by Tyto Robotics to test drone and UAV components such as propulsion systems, propellers, and Electronic Speed Controllers (ESCs). The company is also a distributor of WindShape's wind tunnels and weather simulation equipment.

== History ==
In 2014, co-founders Charles Blouin and Dominic Robillard formed Tyto Robotics (then RCbenchmark) during the completion of their master's theses at the University of Ottawa. During their studies, they developed a small propeller thrust stand to test the propulsion system of a drone helicopter that they were designing. They went on to commercialize the propeller thrust stand, which they called the Series 1580, and it was officially released in 2015.

In 2017, the company received $220,860 in funding from the Government of Canada and Government of Quebec to support the marketing and expansion of the company.

In 2020, Tyto Robotics entered into an agreement with WindShape to become the North American distributor of WindShape's wind tunnels and weather simulation equipment.

The company launched the Flight Stand 150 in 2022, a thrust stand designed to measure up to 150 kgf of thrust, designed for large UAVs. The software allowed users to perform real-time dynamic testing of motors and propellers.

In 2023, the company received a $400,000 investment from the Consortium for Research and Innovation in Aerospace in Quebec (CRIAQ) to fund further research and development on testing large propulsion systems. In the same year, the company introduced software support for Distributed Electric Propulsion (DEP) testing.

In 2024, the Flight Stand 500 was released, capable of measuring up to 500 kgf of thrust. The thrust stand was designed for systems used in advanced air mobility platforms and eVTOL aircraft.

In 2025, the Flight Stand 60 was released to support the testing of internal combustion engines (ICE) for UAVs. In the same year, a motor and propeller balancing software module was released.

== Awards ==
In 2017, Charles Blouin was recognized as the "Mentored of the year" (mentoré de l’année) by the Entrepreneurs' Mentorship Program of the Gatineau Chamber of Commerce (La Chambre de commerce de Gatineau).

In 2022, the co-founders received the Outaouais Regional Innovative Project Award (Prix de reconnaissance des projets novateurs de la région de l'Outaouais) from the Order of Engineers of Quebec (Ordre des ingénieurs du Quebec), which recognizes companies contributing to the Order through innovation.

In 2024, the company was named a finalist for the Export Project of the Year Award (Prix projet d’exportation de l’année) by Investissement Quebec et Export Outaouais.

In 2025, Tyto Robotics won the Jury's Choice Award (Prix Coup de Cœur du Jury) at the Gilles-Demers Awards.
