= Alfred Hempel =

German businessman

Alfred Hempel (1920–1989) was a German businessman. He attracted international attention because of his trade and smuggling of materials used in nuclear facilities in Pakistan, India, Argentina and several other countries.

During World War II, Hempel received the Knight's Cross of the Iron Cross while serving as a battalion leader at Kolberg, Pomerania.

Hempel came into the public spotlight after it was revealed in 1988 that he had smuggled Norwegian and Russian heavy water to India. This was used in one of the Indian reactors used for the production of nuclear weapon material. The transfer happened in 1983, and was one of several such operations carried out by Hempel's network of companies. In 1984 Hempel's company was accused by the U.S. Department of State of transferring nuclear technology and material to Libya. In 1994 and 1995, he is said to have arranged the shipment of gas centrifuge parts from Pakistan to Iran via Dubai. Hempel's technique during this and other such operations was to apply for export of the heavy water to a country that already had such material, such as Germany, then divert the shipment to the real buyer. He was involved in transfers of nuclear material from China, the U.S.S.R., and Norway to ultimate buyers including India, South Africa, and Argentina.

== Sources ==
Arild Aspøy: Family Jewels, (Familiejuveler, Cappelen 1990) * https://lccn.loc.gov/90197055

- Gordon, Michael R. (4 November 1988). "Oslo asserts India got atom material". The New York Times.
- "Brisante Lieferung". Der Spiegel. 31 October 1988.
- "Waffenexporte: Auch bei Neckermann". Der Spiegel. 9 January 1989.
- Milhollin, Gary (10 June 1990). "Asia's Nuclear Nightmare: The German Connection". The Washington Post.
