= Panama Papers and Asia =

Countries with politicians, public officials or close associates implicated in the leak on April 15, 2016 (As of May 19, 2016)

The Panama Papers are 11.5 million leaked documents that detail financial and attorney–client information for more than 214,488 offshore entities. The documents, some dating back to the 1970s, were created by, and taken from, Panamanian law firm and corporate service provider Mossack Fonseca, and were leaked in 2015 by an anonymous source.

This page details related allegations, reactions, and investigations, in Asia.

== Armenia ==
The Panama Papers show Major-General of Justice and head of Armenia's Compulsory Enforcement Service Mihran Poghosyan was connected to three Panama-registered companies: Sigtem Real Estates Inc., Hopkinten Trading Inc., and Bangio Invest S.A., which issued bearer shares only. Poghosyan, who has a degree in economics, was the sole owner of Sigtem and Hopkinten, which together owned Best Realty Ltd, recently awarded government contracts.

Poghosian resigned April 18, saying that it was unacceptable that he had caused Armenia's name to be mentioned alongside that of Azerbaijan, whose president Ilham Aliyev "actually embezzled billions of dollars."

On April 8, Armenian Transparency International Anti-Corruption Center filed a petition with the Ethics Committee for High Level Officials, requesting an investigation of Poghosyan. Members of the families of Poghosyan's uncles Grigor and Mikhail Haroutyunyan were also mentioned in connection with his business.

Varuzhan Hotkanian, head of the Armenian branch of the anti-corruption watchdog Transparency International, said that perhaps Poghosian was forced to resign by the country's leadership, since the evidence pointed directly to him. But, he said, he still questions the government's commitment to fighting corruption. Leading opposition figure Levon Zourabian demanded answers on the matter from the floor of Parliament.

== Azerbaijan ==
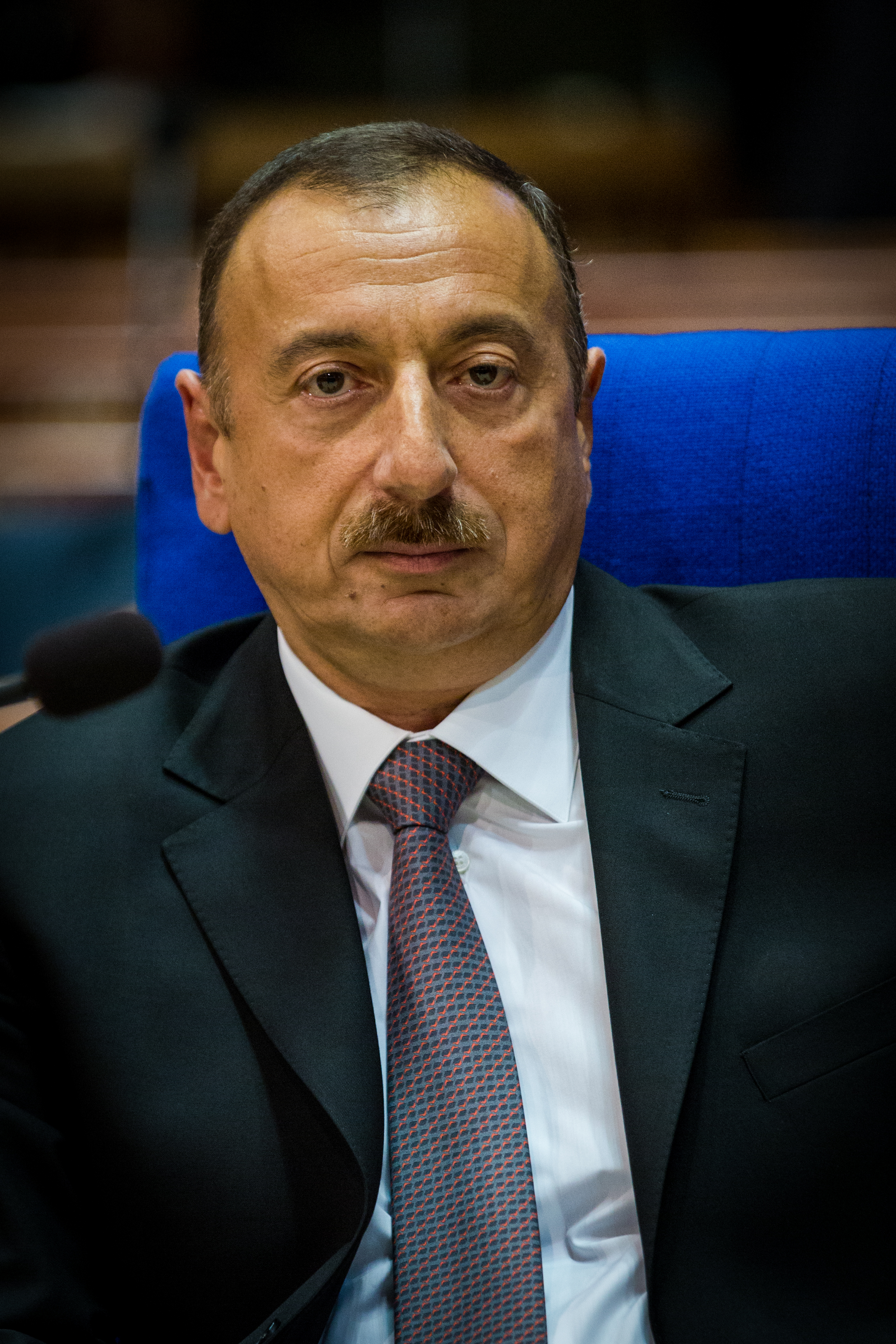
President of Azerbaijan Ilham Aliyev

Azerbaijan International Mineral Resources Operating Company Ltd (AIMROC) and its consortium partners spent nearly US$230 million to open a mine and build a refinery in the western Azerbaijani village of Chovdar. AIMROC possibly produced US$30 million in gold before suddenly disappearing without making payroll in May 2014. Mine employees officially remain on vacation and under Azerbaijani law full-time employees cannot seek work elsewhere even though they have not been paid for two years.

A 2012 investigation, by Radio Free Europe and the Organized Crime and Corruption Reporting Project (OCCRP) discovered that through overseas holding companies, the daughters of Azerbaijani president Ilham Aliyev owned an interest in a gold mine operation created by a 2006 presidential decree forming a consortium, then awarding it a 30-year lease over environmental and transparency objections in Parliament.

But the Panama Papers made it possible to trace some of the elaborate network of shell companies that manage the ownership of the mines, and in 2016 OCCRP was able to establish that in fact the daughters control the mining operation.

Aliyev awarded the gold mines to Globex International LLP, Londex Resources S.A., Willy & Meyris S.A. and Fargate Mining Corporation. Thirty percent of the proceeds were allocated to the government of Azerbaijan; 11% of the remaining 70% went to Globex, 45% to Londex, 29% to Willy & Meyris and the remaining 15% to Fargate.

These companies were registered in Panama, according to the documents obtained from Panama Registry of Companies. A one of them, Fargate Mining Corporation was founded by Tagiva Management Ltd., Tagiva Services Ltd. and Verda Management Ltd. They issued the General Power of Attorney granted in favour of an individual Mr. Nasib Hasanov. Later, Londex Resources S.A., Globex International LLP, Fargate Mining Corporation and Willy & Meyris S.A. had been registered again at St. Kitts and Nevis with same addresses: Associated Trustees Limited of Nevis, Henville Building, Prince Charles Street, Charlestown, Nevis. According to subsequent records, Associated Trustees Limited at this address was used as the registered address for approximately 2,635 companies.

The 2012 investigation's reporters established that Globex was owned through shell companies in Panama, and that these shell companies belonged to the president's daughters and a Swiss businessman whose name appears in other shell companies such as those that manage Azerphone, the family telecommunications monopoly. Villagers told reporters they hoped to work at the mine, which paid $12 a day, and asked them to intervene with the president about the problems the mine was causing with the water supply. They became angry and did not believe the reporters when they said the president's family had a stake in the mine.

Following the May publication of this report, the National Assembly passed a law making it illegal to report company ownership and another giving former presidents and first ladies lifelong legal immunity. Khadija Ismayilova, the Radio Free Europe reporter on the 2012 investigation was subjected to escalating legal and public harassment. She was threatened and eventually arrested. She is currently serving a 7.5 year sentence for tax evasion and abuse of power.

Leaked Mossack Fonseca documents made it possible to establish that the daughters also owned Londex, the majority partner in the gold enterprise. It is not entirely clear why they shut the operation down but industry experts familiar with the consortium say it did not seem very experienced and may have rushed into production.

According to the ICIJ, Aliyev's daughter Arzu not only has financial stakes not only in gold rights but also in Azerfon, the country's largest mobile phone business. She has shares in SW Holding, which "controls nearly every operation related to Azerbaijan Airlines" (Azal), from meals to airport taxis. Both sisters and their brother Heydar own property in Dubai valued at roughly $75 million in 2010; Heydar is the legal owner of nine luxury mansions in Dubai purchased for some $44 million.

Leaked documents show that daughters Leyla and Arzu Aliyeva both hold shares in Exaltation Limited, incorporated in April 2015 for "holding UK property". Child & Child, a London law firm that registered it and obtained nominee directors for it though the Jersey branch of Mossack, claimed in doing so that the women had no political connections.

"The family of Azerbaijan President Ilham Aliyev leads a well-off life thanks in part to financial interests in various sectors of the nation's economy. His wife ascendants are privileged and powerful family that owns banks, insurance and construction companies, a television station and a line of cosmetics. She is well known for her pre-eminent charity work that has led to the construction of schools, hospitals and the country's major sports complex".

== Bangladesh ==
On April 7, 2016, the Anti Corruption Commission Bangladesh launched an inquiry to obtain details of the businesses and individuals allegedly affiliated with Mossack Fonseca. Allegations have been made against thirty-two Bangladeshi individuals and two corporations, media outlets staking this claim have referenced an ICIJ database of information compiled during the investigation of the 2013 Offshore Leaks.

== China ==
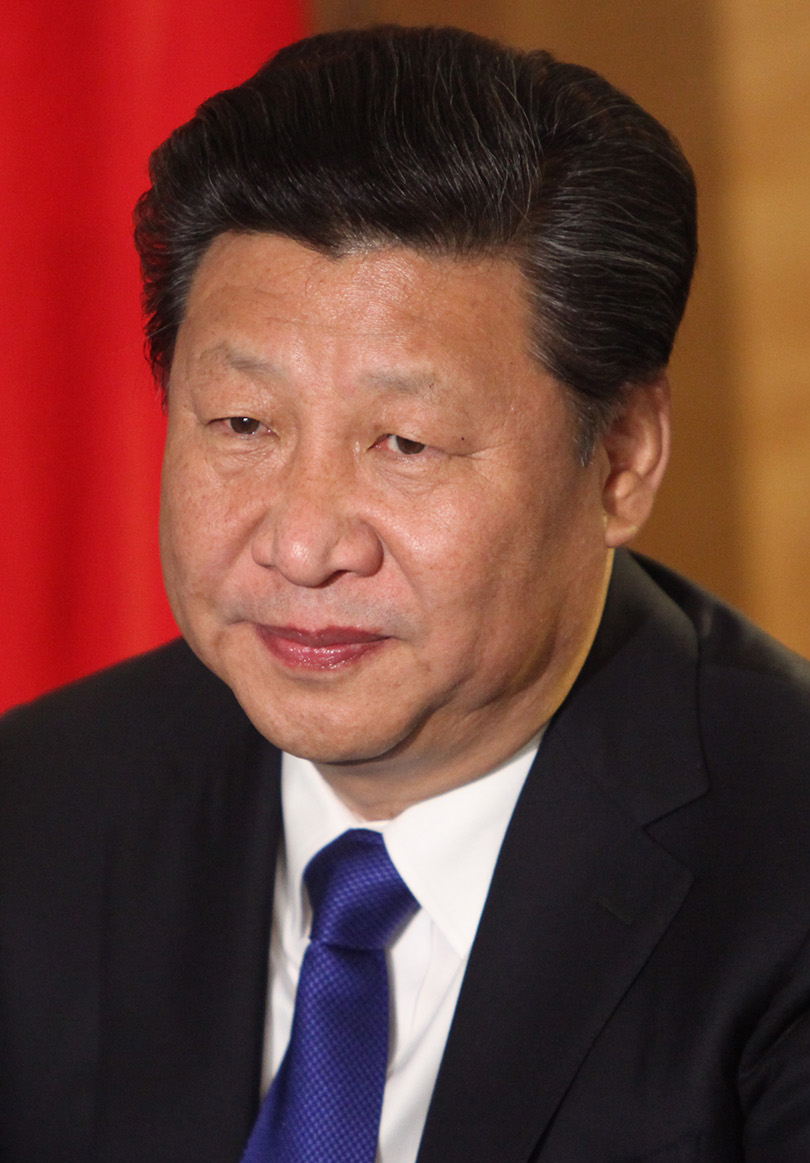
Chinese paramount leader Xi Jinping

Relatives of highly placed Chinese officials including seven current and former senior leaders of the Politburo of the Chinese Communist Party have been named, including former Premier Li Peng's daughter Li Xiaolin, former Communist Party general secretary Hu Yaobang's son Hu Dehua and Deng Jiagui, the brother-in-law of current general secretary Xi Jinping. Deng had two shell companies in the British Virgin Islands while Xi was a member of the Politburo Standing Committee, but they were dormant by the time Xi became General Secretary of the Communist Party (paramount leader) in November 2012. Others named include the son and daughter-in-law of propaganda chief Liu Yunshan and the son-in-law of Vice-Premier Zhang Gaoli.

Official Chinese statistics show investment in British Overseas Territories acting as tax havens being much more significant than in other places: $44 billion invested in the Cayman Islands and $49 billion in the British Virgin Islands. Despite these figures "probably exclud[ing] the private investments of the many family members of the ruling elite who have channelled money through the BVI", both figures exceed Chinese investment in the United States and United Kingdom.

China's government suppressed mention of the Panama Papers on social media and in search engines results, and reportedly told news organizations to delete all content related to the Panama Papers leak. Chinese authorities consider the material a concerted foreign media attack on China, and ordered Internet information offices to delete reports reprinted from the Panama Papers, and with no exceptions not to follow up on related content. Hong Lei, spokesman for China's foreign ministry, responded that he had "no comment" for "such groundless accusations" at an April 5 news conference.

A leaked national-level directive obtained by the China Digital Times showed that authorities had forced all websites to delete content about the Panama Papers. Foreign websites such as WikiLeaks and China Digital Times are blocked from mainland China. On Sina Weibo, a Twitter-like social media website, censors deleted content about the Panama Paper. However, the name of Xi's brother-in-law got through, and Weibo users tried to circumvent them with less obvious language such as "brother-in-law", "Canal Papers" (for the Panama Canal), and so on. Despite the censorship, Weibo search ranking was topped by phrases seemingly related to the Panama Papers, such as "tax evasion", "document", "leak" and "Putin".

Chinese entertainment magnate and art collector Wang Zhongjun also appears in the documents and did not respond to a request for comment.

According to the Tax Justice Network, Chinese investors sometimes use overseas companies to take advantage of incentives China offers to foreign investors.

Canadian broadcaster Radio Canada has reported that Hong Kong-based CITIC Pacific had Mossack Fonseca set up or manage more than 90 subsidiaries, and that the Chinese government was a majority stakeholder, according to fiscal expert Marwah Rizqy, a Canadian politician and former professor of tax law at the Université de Sherbrooke.

=== Hong Kong ===
Mossack Fonseca's Hong Kong office was its busiest, says the ICIJ, as Chinese officials and other wealthy figures would carry funds across the border and deposit them there to be channeled to offshore entities. Hong Kong invested HK$4.6 trillion (£360 billion) into the BVI – more than Hong Kong invested in mainland China – and received HK$4.1 trillion (over £300 billion) from the BVI. A further £20 billion or so was placed into the Cayman Islands and Bermuda individually.

Newspaper Ming Pao fired deputy editor Keung Kwok-yuen following a front-page article on the Panama Papers which mentioned many prominent Hong Kong citizens. The paper blamed a "difficult business environment," but had previously fired another editor in 2014 over another leak of offshore documents. Employees have been publishing blank columns scattered through the newspaper in protest of his dismissal.

Polytechnic University has two offshore companies set up by Mossack Fonseca in 2012 and 2013. One was created by vice-president Nicholas Yang Wei-hsiung, who became IT minister of Hong Kong.

== Georgia ==
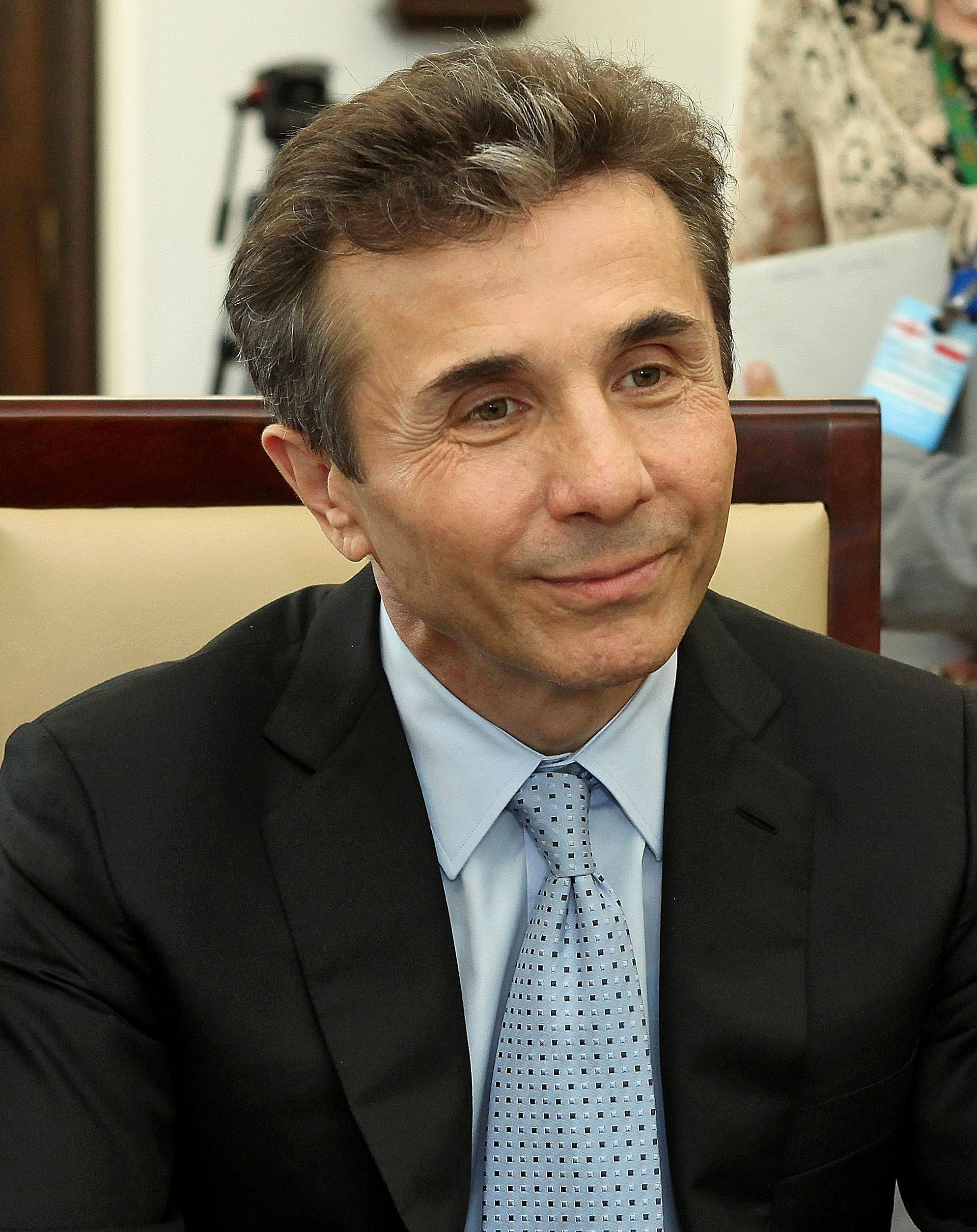
Bidzina Ivanishvili, former Prime Minister of Georgia

Bidzina Ivanishvili became wealthy in Russia before returning to Georgia and becoming prime minister in 2012; his public official's asset declaration was 72 pages long. However, he does not list Lynden Management, a Mossack Fonseca company which held about 20% of the shares of Raptor Pharmaceuticals (which he did declare), a US-based company listed on the New York Stock Exchange. He refused for nearly four years to provide a copy of his passport and a proof of address to the law firm, which needed it to comply with money-laundering regulations as well as inquiries into the company by the Financial Investigation Agency of the British Virgin Islands.

Forbes calculates Ivanishvili's net worth at $4.8 billion.

== India ==
Bollywood celebrities Amitabh Bachchan, his daughter-in-law and actress Aishwarya Rai Bachchan and actor Ajay Devgan are listed in the papers. Bachchan has denied any connection to overseas companies, and a spokesman for Rai also questioned the documents' authenticity. Bachchan repeated the denial in response to an August 21 report that he was listed as a director of two companies and participated in board meetings.

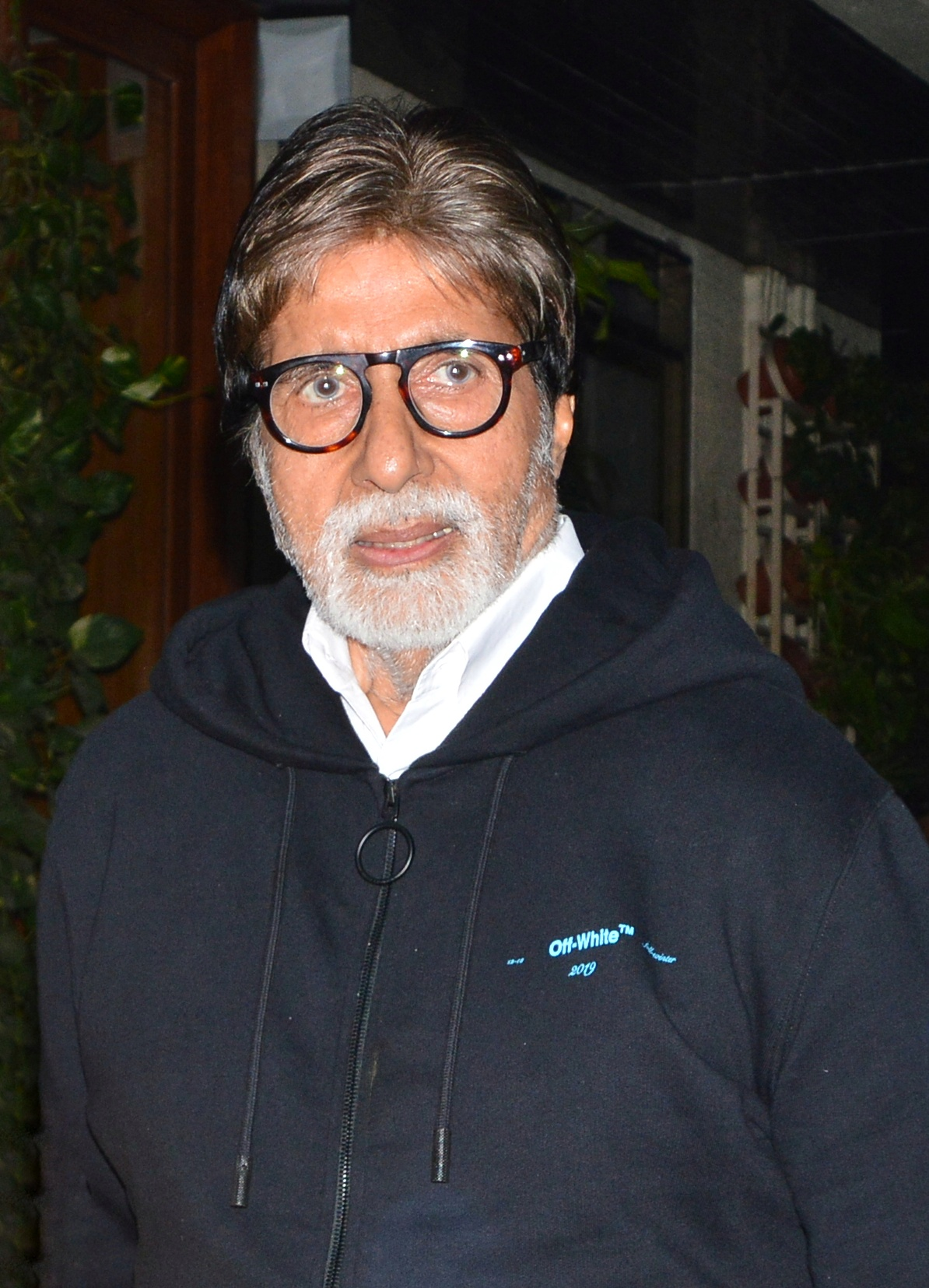
Bollywood actor Amitabh Bachchan is listed in Panama Papers

Also listed are real estate developer and DLF CEO Kushal Pal Singh, Sameer Gehlaut of the Indiabulls group, and Iqbal Mirchi. Shares of both companies fell following the release of the papers, as well as those of Apollo Tyres, which had also been mentioned. DLF said it had invested in existing overseas companies in compliance with the LRS Scheme set up in 2004 and reported this to the Indian tax agency. An Apollo spokesman said that the family members of Chairman Onkar Kanwar who had been reported as owning offshore companies did not live in India and had complied with the law where they resided. Gehlaut said he had paid full taxes and made full disclosures.

Indian politicians on the list include Shishir Bajoria from West Bengal and Anurag Kejriwal, former chief of the Delhi Lok Satta Party. Bajoria said he owned two other Isle of Man companies but not the one ascribed to him in the leaked documents. Corporate services provider First Names Group acknowledged erroneously providing his information to Mossack Fonseca. MF records show Anurag Kejriwal as director of three offshore companies based in the British Virgin Islands (BVI), and holding two private foundations in Panama and power of attorney of another BVI company. He acknowledged having had offshore companies but said he shut them down after a short period of time.

The name of deceased drug kingpin Iqbal Mirchi has also surfaced in the papers. Some 500 Indian citizens appear to be mentioned.

Indian government ordered an inquiry, and subsequently announced that it was constituting a special multi-agency group comprising officers from the investigative unit of the Central Board of Direct Taxes (CBDT) and its Foreign Tax and Tax Research Division, the Financial Intelligence Unit and the Reserve Bank of India. By June 2021, the CBDT identified undeclared assets worth of ₹20,078 crore (equivalent to ₹230 billion or US$2.3 billion in 2023) following the investigation. Total 46 cases were filed while the investigations were carried out in 83 cases. Total ₹142 crore (US$15 million) were recovered as taxes from the individuals under prosecution.

== Israel ==
Some 600 Israeli companies and 850 Israeli shareholders are listed. Among the Israeli names found in the leaked documents are top attorney Dov Weissglass, who was the bureau chief of deceased prime minister Ariel Sharon; Jacob Engel, a businessman active in the African mining industry; and Idan Ofer, a member of one of Israel's wealthiest families, according to Haaretz.

Weissglass' name appears as a sole owner of one of four companies set up by his business partner Assaf Halkin. The company, Talaville Global, was registered in the British Virgin Islands in May 2012, according to Haaretz, and seven months later, all of its shares were mortgaged against a loan from a Vienna bank.

Weissglass and Halkin told Haaretz that the company "was registered for the purpose of receiving a loan from the bank in order to invest in European properties. The bank would only allow a loan to a corporation... [the] company activity is reported to the tax authorities in Israel. The required tax on the said activity is paid in Israel."

Many leaked documents reference Bank Leumi, primarily its branch on the island tax haven of Jersey. One of its customers, billionaire Teddy Sagi, made his fortune developing online gambling technology in England and recently developed the Camden Market commercial real estate space. Sagi is sole shareholder of at least 16 Mossack Fonseca offshore companies, mostly real estate ventures.

Israeli businessman Beny Steinmetz was also a Mossack Fonseca customer, with 282 companies.

== Pakistan ==
=== Nawaz Sharif ===
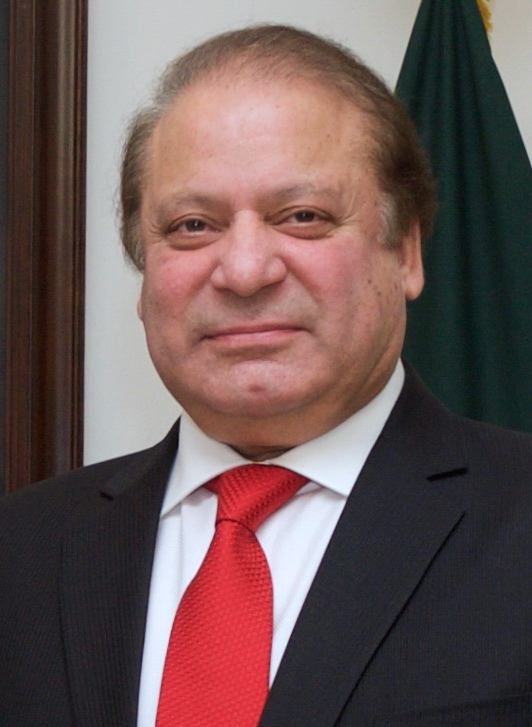
Nawaz Sharif, former Prime Minister of Pakistan

Nawaz Sharif was the second top official to be ruled out as the result of information disclosures in the Panama Papers. Supreme Court disqualified him from office. One judge said that Mr Sharif was no longer "eligible to be an honest member of the parliament". Pakistan's ruling party, the Pakistan Muslim League-Nawaz (PML-N), was permitted by the speaker of the National Assembly to select an interim prime minister until the 2018 general election. The Supreme Court verdict was announced in the context of heightened security in the capital. Over 3,000 armed police and members of the Pakistan Rangers paramilitary force were deployed around the Supreme Court. The verdict followed months of dramatic news coverage and social media debates, the divisions falling largely along party lines.

A hearing on October 18, 2017, resulted in an indictment for Sharif, who has faced allegations of corruption since the 1980s. The Panama Papers corroborated a federal inquiry in the mid-1990s and name both Nawaz Sharif and his younger brother, Shebaz Sharif, who was the chief minister of Punjab at the time. They also link in-laws of Shebaz Sharif and children of Nawaz Sharif to offshore companies. Mossack Fonseca records tie Nawaz' daughter Maryam Nawaz and her brothers Hussein and Hassan to four offshore companies, Nescoll Limited, Nielson Holdings Limited, Coomber Group Inc., and Hangon Property Holdings Limited. The companies acquired luxury real estate in London during 2006–2007. The real estate was collateral for loans of up to $13.8 million, according to the Panama Papers. The prime minister's children say the money came from the sale of a family business in Saudi Arabia. But these offshore companies and assets were not disclosed on his family's wealth statement and the suspicion that the companies were meant to hide or launder ill-gotten wealth or to avoid taxes called Sharif's ethics into question.

Prior to the ruling, Maryam Nawaz had tweeted denial of wrongdoing, adding that she did not own "any company/property abroad," except as "a trustee" in a brother's corporation, "which only entitles me to distribute assets to my brother Hussain's family/children if needed." The leaked documents name her as a trustee of Nescoll, created in 1993, and Nielson, first registered in 1994. The two companies subscribed to Mossack Fonseca services in July 2006. Mossack Fonseca was managing Nescoll, Nielsen Holdings, and Coomber Group when the three companies obtained a £7 million mortgage from the Swiss bank, Deutsche Bank (Suisse) SA and purchased four flats in Avenfield House, at 118 Park Lane in London. Hassan, the other brother, bought Hangon Holdings and its stock in 2007 for £5.5 million; Hangon then bought property, financed through the Bank of Scotland, at 1 Hyde Park Place in London.

Samina Durrani, mother of Shebaz Sharif's second wife, and Ilyas Mehraj, brother of his first, also figure in the documents. Habib Waqas Group/Ilyas Mehraj is listed as a shareholder with 127,735 shares in Haylandale Limited, registered July 24, 2003 in the Bahamas. Mehraj has denied knowing anything about "any company whether incorporated in the Commonwealth of Bahamas or anywhere else under the name: Haylandale Ltd." Rainbow Limited, the newest of the three offshore companies owned by Samina Durrani, was registered September 29, 2010 in the British Virgin Islands (BVI). Armani River Limited, registered in the Bahamas on May 16, 2002, describes its assets as "property in London, which is not currently rented." Assets of Star Precision Limited, registered in BVI May 21, 1997, were reported as "cash as the investment portfolio. We are also holding 1,165,238 shares in Orix Leasing Pakistan Limited."

Hussain Nawaz said his family won't hamper any investigation, and urged one of former president Pervez Musharraf as well. The government on April 15 announced an investigation by an inquiry commission of all Pakistanis named in the documents. Opposition politicians said a judge, not a retired judge, should investigate. Numerous judges recused themselves. On July 28, 2017, the Supreme Court of Pakistan, disqualified Sharif from holding office.

=== Benazir Bhutto ===
The late Benazir Bhutto was also a Mossack Fonseca client. In 2001 the firm set up BVI company Petroline International Inc. for Bhutto, her nephew Hassan Ali Jaffery Bhutto, and her aide and head of security Rehman Malik, who later became a Senator and Interior Minister in the government of Yousaf Raza Gillani. Mossack Fonseca had deemed Bhutto's first company, the similarly named Petrofine FZC, politically sensitive and "declined to accept Mrs Bhutto as a client." A United Nations committee chaired by former US Federal Reserve head Paul Volcker had determined in a 2005 investigation into abuses of the oil-for-food program that Petrofine FZC paid US$2 million to the Iraqi government of Saddam Hussein to obtain US$115–145 million in oil contracts.

In 2006, the Pakistani National Accountability Bureau (NAB) accused Bhutto, Malik and Ali Jaffery of owning Petrofine, established since 2000 in Sharjah, United Arab Emirates. Bhutto and the Pakistan Peoples Party denied it. In April 2006 an NAB court froze assets owned in Pakistan and elsewhere by Bhutto and her husband Asif Ali Zardari, saying that the assets, totaling $1.5 billion, were the result of corrupt practices, and that Swiss charges of criminal money laundering filed in 1997 were still in litigation.

== Palestine ==
Tareq Abbas, a son of Mahmoud Abbas, the president of the Palestinian Authority, was revealed to hold $1 million in shares of the Arab Palestinian Investment Company (APIC), an offshore company associated with the Palestinian Authority and partially owned by the Authority's Palestine Investment Fund.

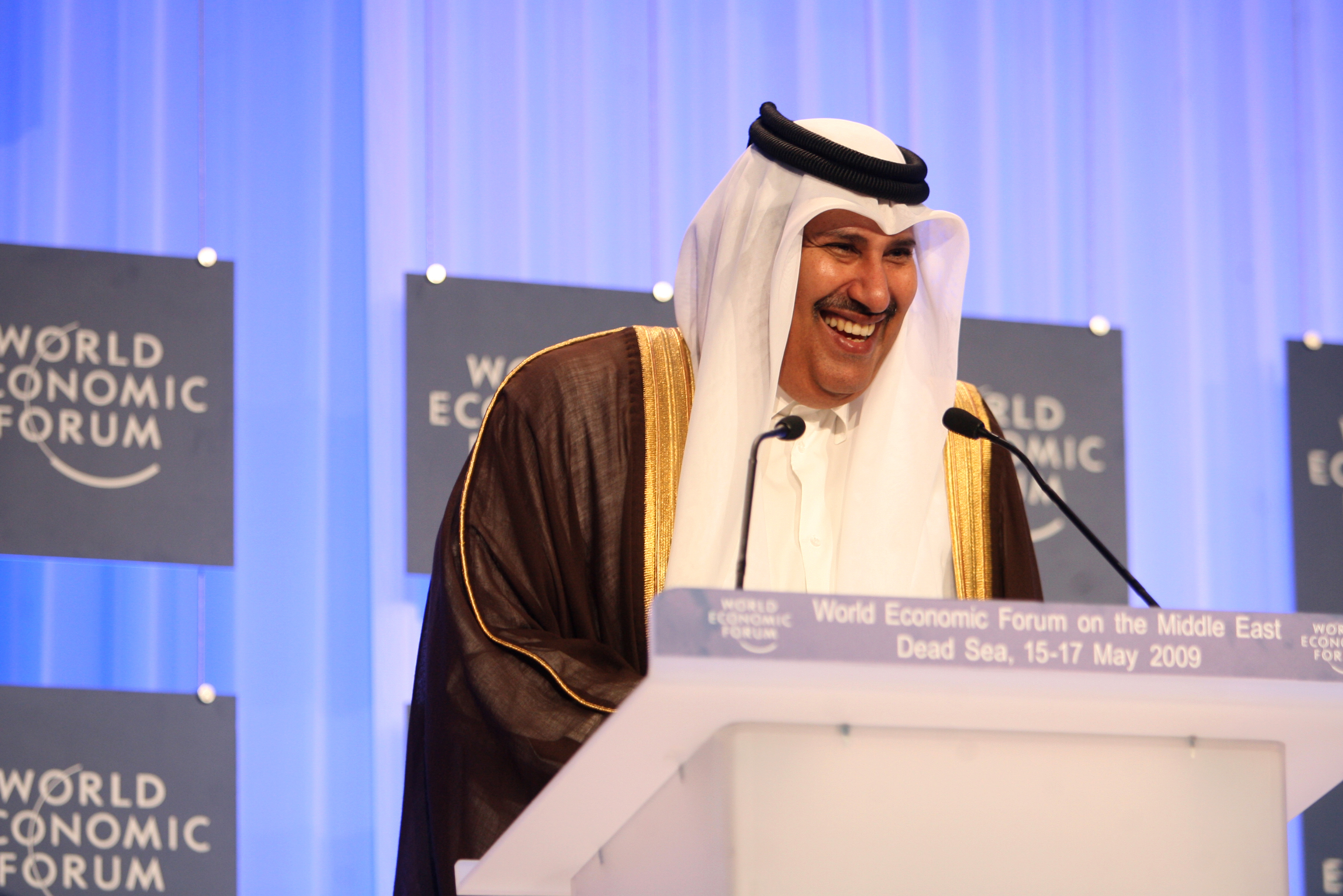
Sheik Hamad bin Jassim bin Jaber Al Thani, former prime minister of Qatar

== Qatar ==
Hamad bin Jassim bin Jaber Al Thani, prime minister from 2007 to 2013, in 2002 acquired three shell companies incorporated in the Bahamas and another in the British Virgin Islands and through them moorage in Mallorca and a $300 million yacht named Al Mirqab. The Panama Papers indicate he owns or owned eight shell companies. Subsequent reporting by Forbes found that Al Thani bought $700 million in Deutsche Bank shares in 2014 through Paramount Services Holdings and in 2015 transferred roughly half the stock to Supreme Universal Holdings, owned by a relative who had left office as emir of Qatar, also in 2013.

== Saudi Arabia ==
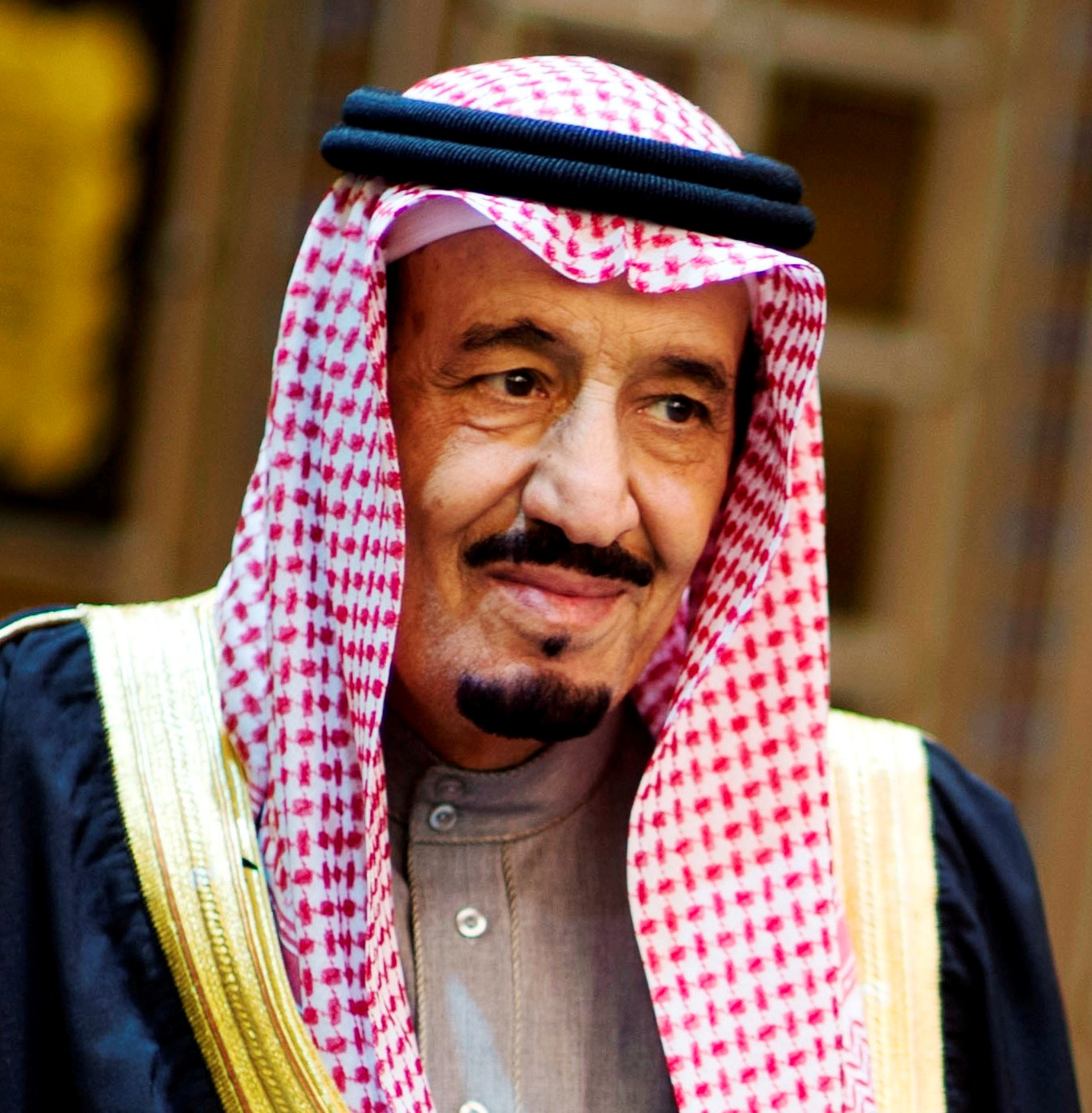
King Salman of Saudi Arabia

King Salman is mentioned in the leaks in relation to two companies based in the British Virgin Islands—Verse Development Corporation, incorporated in 1999, and Inrow Corporation, incorporated in 2002. The companies took out mortgages totaling over US$34 million and purchased properties in central London. His role in the companies was not specified. BVI company Crassus Limited, incorporated in 2004, registered a yacht in London, named Erga after King Salman's palace in Riyadh. The vessel boasts a banquet hall and can comfortably sleep 30. Former Crown Prince Muhammad bin Nayef is also named in the papers.

The Irish Times found a link to Iran-Contra in the Panama Papers, in the persons of one of America's most colourful political donors Farhad Azima and multi-billionaire Adnan Khashoggi, who both employed Mossack Fonseca's services, and were both important figures in Iran-Contra scandal.

The Mossack Fonseca files show Khashoggi appeared as early as 1978, when he became president of the Panamanian company ISIS Overseas S.A. The documents reveal that Fonseca's clients included Sheikh Kamal Adham, Saudi Arabia's first intelligence chief (1963–79), brother-in-law of King Faisal, who was named by a US Senate committee as the CIA's “principal liaison for the entire the Middle East from the mid-1960s through 1979”. Adham controlled offshore companies involved in the B.C.C.I. banking scandal.

== Singapore ==
The Ministry of Finance and Monetary Authority of Singapore said in a statement that "Singapore takes a serious view on tax evasion and will not tolerate its business and financial centre being used to facilitate tax related crimes. If there is evidence of wrongdoing by any individual or entity in Singapore, we will not hesitate to take firm action."

== Sri Lanka ==
Sri Lankan Finance Minister Ravi Karunanayake said his panel will investigate Sri Lankan names that come up in the Panama Papers, as well as the 46 who appear in the 2013 Offshore Leaks, according to the Daily Mail, since earlier leadership apparently did not do so. The country has many large outstanding foreign loans taken out under the administration of former president Mahinda Rajapakse, and the current government recently had to obtain a US$1.5 billion IMF bailout. Rajapakse has denied diverting funds. The current government came to power in January 2016 on an anti-corruption platform.

== Syria ==
Rami Makhlouf, a maternal cousin of Bashar al-Assad, was worth an estimated $5 billion before the Syrian Civil War, and had control of 60% of the economy. He was subject to sanctions by the United States and the European Union, and controlled Syria's oil and telecommunications business. The US Treasury charged that Pangates, a company registered to him, supplied the Assad government with a thousand tonnes of aviation fuel. However, the Makhloufs were able to continue to operate via Panama shell companies, registered in the British Virgin Islands, and so not subject to US law – however, on May 9, 2011, the EU issued its own sanctions, and these were extended by an order in council to the British Virgin Islands in July 2011. Mossack Fonseca decided September 6 to resign from Makhlouf's companies. By then, Makhlouf had already cut ties with his bank. HSBC told the law firm that the Swiss authorities had frozen Makhlouf's accounts, and that "they have had no contact with the beneficial owner of this company since the last 3 months".

== Thailand ==
The Bangkok Post reported that the "Anti-Money Laundering Office (AMLO) is seeking information from its foreign counterparts regarding twenty-one Thai nationals reportedly included in a list of people worldwide using a Panama-based law firm apparently specializing in money laundering and tax evasion." It is not clear why AMLO is investigating only twenty-one. The Panama Papers include at least 780 names of individuals based in Thailand and another 50 companies based in Thailand. Some are foreigners or foreign-owned companies, but 634 individual addresses in Thailand appear in the documents that have surfaced to date, including the CEOs of giant companies Bangkok Land and Phatra Finance.

== Taiwan ==
Investigations by ICIJ's sole East Asian partner CommonWealth Magazine in Taiwan found that at least 2,725 offshore companies had registered addresses in Taiwan. Ninety Taiwanese, including the singer and actor Nicky Wu, were included in the papers. According to a report released by CommonWealth Magazine, Wu used the firm Horizon Sky Technology, Ltd. to co-operate with Hong Kong-based Sun Entertainment Culture Limited (zh).

The publisher concludes that: "Taiwanese companies and individuals are believed to be extensively using offshore shelters to avoid or evade taxes ... after scouring the Panama Papers documents that Mossack Fonseca has not been one of their main conduits. This time, it appears that big Taiwanese banks, law firms and accounting firms did not often use the services of Mossack Fonseca, which does not have a presence in Taiwan. The forty-six Taiwanese brokers that did work with Mossack Fonseca were relatively small-scale consulting firms operating in Greater China. Most of the Taiwanese entities that set up shell companies through the Panamanian law firm were small, unlisted companies or individuals."

== United Arab Emirates ==
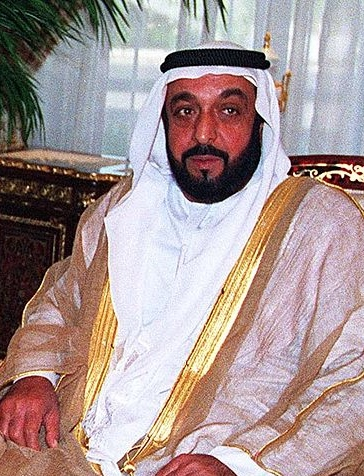
United Arab Emirates President Khalifa bin Zayed Al Nahyan

ICIJ, The Guardian and The Independent have reported that former UAE President Khalifa bin Zayed Al Nahyan owned London real estate worth more than £1.2 billion through a structure of some thirty shell companies Mossack Fonseca set up for him in the British Virgin Islands and administered for him, using them to manage and control the luxury properties in London. By December 2015, Mossack Fonseca held nearly all of the shares in those companies in trust structures on his behalf, with bin Zayed and his wife, son, and daughter the trust beneficiaries.

== See also ==
- Bahamas Leaks
- Mauritius Leaks
- Money laundering
- Offshore Leaks
- Offshore magic circle
- Panama Papers
- Pandora Papers
- Paradise Papers
- Suisse secrets
- Taxation in Bermuda
