= Nanomechanical resonator =

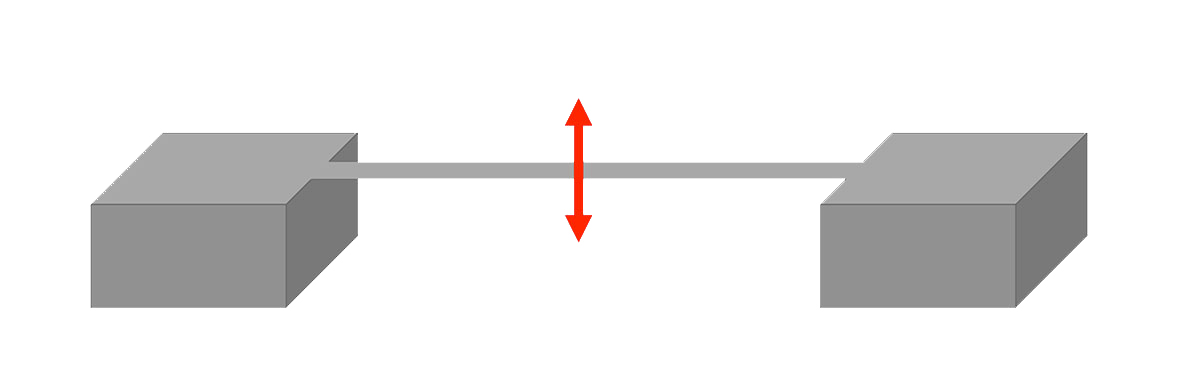
Diagram of a nanomechanical resonator

A nanomechanical resonator is a nanoelectromechanical systems ultra-small resonator that oscillates at a specific frequency depending on its mass and stiffness.

== See also ==
- Quartz crystal microbalance
- Atomic force microscopy
