= Balancing of rotating masses =

Mechanical vibration

The balancing of rotating bodies is the process of minimizing vibration. Heavy industrial machines such as gas turbines and electric generators can cause catastrophic failure, as well as noise and discomfort. In the case of a narrow wheel, balancing simply involves moving the center of gravity to the center of rotation. Both force and couple polygons should be close enough to prevent the effect of centrifugal force in order to be completely balanced. It is important to design the machine parts wisely so that the unbalance is reduced up to the minimum possible level or eliminated.

== Static balance ==
Static balance occurs when the center of gravity of an object is on the axis of rotation. The object can therefore remain stationary, with the axis horizontal, without the application of any braking force. It has no tendency to rotate due to the force of gravity. This is seen in bike wheels where the reflective plate is placed opposite the valve to distribute the center of mass to the center of the wheel. Other examples include grindstones, discs or car wheels. Verifying static balance requires the freedom for the object to rotate with as little friction as possible.

This may be provided with sharp, hardened knife edges, adjusted to be both horizontal and parallel. Alternatively, a pair of free-running ball bearing races is substituted for each knife edge, which relaxed the horizontal and parallel requirement. The object is either axially symmetrical like a wheel or must be provided with an axle. It is slowly spun, and when it comes to rest, it will stop at a random position if statically balanced. An adhesive or clip on weight is securely attached to achieve balance if not balanced correctly.

== Dynamic balance ==
Rotating shaft unbalanced by two identical attached weights, which causes a counterclockwise centrifugal couple Cd that must be resisted by a clockwise couple Fℓ = Cd exerted by the bearings. The figure is drawn from the viewpoint of a frame rotating with the shaft, hence the centrifugal forces.

A rotating system of mass is in dynamic balance when the rotation does not produce any resultant centrifugal force or couple. The system rotates without requiring the application of any external force or couple, other than that required to support its weight. If a system is initially unbalanced, to avoid the stress upon the bearings caused by the centrifugal couple, counterbalancing weights must be added.

This is seen when a bicycle wheel gets a buckled rim. The wheel will not rotate to a preferred position but because some rim mass is offset, there is a wobbling couple leading to a dynamic vibration. If the spokes on this wheel cannot be adjusted to center the rim, an alternative method is used to provide dynamic balance.

The three requirements to correct dynamic imbalance are a means of spinning the object, a frame to allow the object to vibrate perpendicular to its rotation axis and a means to detect the imbalance by sensing its vibrating displacement, vibration velocity or (ideally) its instantaneous acceleration.

If the object is disk-like, weights may be attached near the rim to reduce the sensed vibration. This is called one-plane dynamic balancing. If the object is cylinder or rod-like, it may be preferable to execute two-plane balancing, which holds one end's spin axis steady, while the other end's vibration is reduced. Then the near end is freed to vibrate, while the far end spin axis is fixed, and vibration is again reduced. In precision work, this two plane measurement may be iterated.

Dynamic balancing was formerly the province of expensive equipment, but users with just occasional need to quench running vibrations may use the built in accelerometers of a smart phone and a spectrum analysis application. A less tedious means of achieving dynamic balance requires four measurements: Initial imbalance reading and imbalance reading with a test mass attached on a reference point, then the test mass moves to 120 degrees ahead and again imbalanced. Finally, the test mass moves to 120 degrees behind the reference point. These four readings are sufficient to define the size and position of a final mass to achieve good balance.

For production balancing, the phase of dynamic vibration is observed with its amplitude. This allows one-shot dynamic balance to be achieved with a single spin, by adding a mass of internally calculated size in a calculated position. This is the method commonly used to dynamically balance automobile wheels with tire installed by means of clip-on lead (or currently zinc) 'wheel weights'.

== Unbalanced systems ==
When an unbalanced system is rotating, periodic linear and/or torsional forces are generated which are perpendicular to the axis of rotation. The periodic nature of these forces is commonly experienced as vibration. These off-axis vibration forces may exceed the design limits of individual machine elements, reducing the service life of these parts. For instance, a bearing may be subjected to perpendicular torsion forces that would not occur in a nominally balanced system, or the instantaneous linear forces may exceed the limits of the bearing. Such excessive forces will cause failure in bearings in short time periods. Shafts with unbalanced masses can be bent by the forces and experience fatigue failure.

Under conditions where rotating speed is very high even though the mass is low, as in gas turbines or jet engines, or under conditions where rotating speed is low but the mass is high, as in ship propellers, balance of the rotating system should be highly considered, because it may generate large vibrations and cause failure of the whole system.
