= Uranium metallurgy =

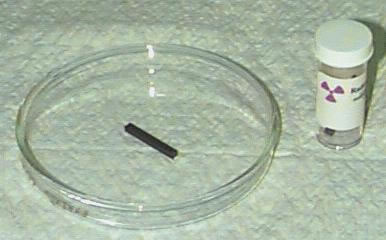
Uranium

In materials science and materials engineering, uranium metallurgy is the study of the physical and chemical behavior of uranium and its alloys.

Commercial-grade uranium can be produced through the reduction of uranium halides with alkali or alkaline earth metals. Uranium metal can also be made through electrolysis of KUF_{5} or UF_{4}, dissolved in a molten CaCl_{2} and NaCl. Very pure uranium can be produced through the thermal decomposition of uranium halides on a hot filament.

The uranium isotope ^{235}U is used as the fuel for nuclear reactors and nuclear weapons. It is the only isotope existing in nature to any appreciable extent that is fissile, that is, fissionable by thermal neutrons. The isotope ^{238}U is also important because it absorbs neutrons to produce a radioactive isotope that subsequently decays to the isotope 239Pu (plutonium), which also is fissile. Uranium in its natural state comprises just 0.71% ^{235}U and 99.3% ^{238}U, and the main focus of uranium metallurgy is the enrichment of uranium through isotope separation.

== See also ==
- Nuclear weapon design#Enriched materials
- Uranium tile

== Sources ==
- Uranium
- Enriched uranium
- Nuclear weapon design
- The technology of mining and metallurgy , retrieved 7 October 2005.
