= List of missiles of Pakistan =

This is a list of missiles used by Pakistan. It includes both offensively-used and defensively-used rockets and missiles, including cruise missiles and ballistic missiles, operated by the Pakistan Army, Pakistan Navy, and Pakistan Air Force.

== Surface-to-surface missiles ==
=== Multiple Rocket Launchers (MLRS) ===
(MLRS) operates under the Army Rocket Force Command of the Pakistan Army
Name	Image	Origin	Manufacturer	Type	Operational Range	Status	Note
Ghazab		Russia	KRL	MLRS	40 km	In service	Based on the Soviet BM-21 Grad. The system can launch POF built Yarmuk rocket and is locally produced under the designation "Ghazab"
PHL-81 "Azar"		China	KRL	MLRS	40 km	In service	Based on the Type 81 Chinese variant of the BM-21 Grad. The locally produced system is designated as the "Azar"
A-100E		China	CALT	MLRS	100 km	In service	
Fatah-I		Pakistan	NESCOM	Guided MLRS	140 km	In service	
Fatah-II		Pakistan	NESCOM	Guided MLRS	450 km	In service	
Fatah-III		Pakistan	NESCOM	Supersonic Cruise Missile	300 km	In service	
Fatah-IV		Pakistan	NESCOM	Subsonic Cruise Missile	750 km	In service	
Fatah-V		Pakistan	NESCOM	Long Range Cruise Missile	1000 km (Expected)	In service	

=== Surface-to-surface ballistic missiles ===
Operated under the Army Strategic Forces Command of the Pakistan Army
Name		Image	Origin	Manufacturer	Type	Operational Range	Status	Note
Tactical Ballistic Missiles (TBM)
Hatf-I	Hatf-I		Pakistan	SUPARCO	Ballistic Missile	70 km unguided	In service	
Hatf-I	Hatf-I A		Pakistan	SUPARCO	Ballistic Missile	100 km unguided	In service	
Hatf-I	Hatf-I B		Pakistan	SUPARCO	Ballistic Missile	100 km inertial guidance	In service	
Nasr			Pakistan	NDC	Ballistic Missile	70 km	In service	
Abdali			Pakistan	SUPARCO	Ballistic Missile	450 km	In service	
Short Range Ballistic Missiles (SRBM)
Ghaznavi			Pakistan	NDC	Ballistic Missile	300 km	In service	
Shaheen-I	Shaheen-I		Pakistan	NESCOM	Ballistic Missile	700 km	In service	
Shaheen-I	Shaheen-I A		Pakistan	NESCOM	Ballistic Missile	1000 km	In service	
Medium Range Ballistic Missiles (MRBM)
Ghauri-I			Pakistan	KRL	Ballistic Missile	1,500 km	In service	
Ghauri-II			Pakistan	KRL	Ballistic Missile	2,000 km	In service	
Ababeel			Pakistan	NESCOM	MIRV, Ballistic Missile	2,200 km	In service	
Shaheen-II			Pakistan	NESCOM	Ballistic Missile	2,500 km	In service	
Shaheen-III			Pakistan	NESCOM	Ballistic Missile	2,750 km	In service	

=== Anti-Ship & Anti-Surface guided missiles ===
Name		Image	Origin	Manufacturer	Type	Operational Range	Status	Note
Ground-Launched operated by the Pakistan Army								
Babur 1	Babur-IA		Pakistan	NDC	Cruise Missile	450 km	In service	
Babur 1	Babur-IB		Pakistan	NDC	Cruise Missile	900 km	In service	
Babur 2			Pakistan	NDC	Cruise Missile	750 km	In service	
Zarb			Pakistan	N/A	Anti-Ship Cruise Missile	300 km	In service	Used by coastal defense units.
Ship-Launched operated by the Pakistan Navy								
Harbah			Pakistan	GIDS	Anti-Ship Cruise Missile	280 km	In service	Used by Azmat-class fast attack craft and other warships.
C-802			China	CASIC	Anti-Ship Cruise Missile	120 km	In service	
C-802A			China	CASIC	Anti-Ship Cruise Missile	180 km	In service	Installed on Zulfiquar-class frigate.
CM-302			China	CASIC	Anti-Ship Supersonic Cruise Missile	280 km	In service	Installed on Tughril-class frigate
RGM-84, Harpoon Block-II			United States	McDonnell Douglas / BDS	Anti-Ship Subsonic Cruise Missile	N/A	In service	
P282 SMASH			Pakistan	MTC	Anti-Ship Ballistic Missile	350 km	In service	
Submarine Launched operated by the Pakistan Navy Submarine Force								
Babur 3			Pakistan	NDC	SLCM	450 km	In service	
Exocet SM-39			France	MBDA	SLCM	50 km	In service	Used by Khalid-class submarine.
UGM-84L, Harpoon Block-II			United States	McDonnell Douglas/BDS	SLCM	124 km	In service	Used by Hashmat-class submarines.

=== Anti-Tank Guided Missile (ATGM) ===
Operated by Pakistan Army
Name	Image	Origin	Manufacturer	Type	Operational Range	Status	Note
Bhaktar Shikan		Pakistan / China	GIDS	Wire-Guided Anti-Tank Missile	N/A	In service	
BGM-71 TOW		United States	RTX	Wire-Guided Anti-Tank Missile	3,750 m	In service	
Kornet-E		Russia	Degtyaryov Plant	Laser-Guided Anti-Tank Missile	8,000 m	In service	
9M119 Svir/Refleks		Soviet Union	Tula KBP	Laser-Guided beam riding Anti-Tank Missile	5,000 m	In service	

== Surface-to-air missiles ==
=== Air Defence Systems ===
Name	Image	Origin	Manufacturer	Type	Variants	Operational range	Status	Note
Operated by the Air Defence Command of the Pakistan Army								
HQ-9		China	CASIC	Long Range	HQ-9P	125 km against fighter jets and aircraft. 25 km against cruise missiles	In service	
HQ-16		China	SAST	Medium Range	LY-80	40 km	In service	
HQ-16		China	SAST	Medium Range	LY-80EV	70 km	In service	
HQ-11		China	CASIC	Short to medium range	FM-3000	30 km against aircraft. 20 km against missiles.	In service	
HQ-7		China	CASC	SHORAD	FM-90	15 km	In service	
Operated by the Air Defence Command of the Pakistan Air Force								
HQ-19		China	CALT / CASIC	Very-long Range/ABM/ASAT	HQ-19E	3000 km	Induction Phase	
HQ-9		China	CASIC	Long Range	HQ-9BE	260–280 km	In service	
HQ-16		China	SAST	Medium Range	HQ-16FE	160 km	In service	
HQ-17		China	CASIC	SHORAD	HQ-17AE	20 km	In service	
Aspide		Italy	MBDA Italy	SHORAD	Spada-2000	25 km	In service	
Crotale		France	Thales Group	SHORAD	Crotale-2000	15 km	In service	
Crotale		France	Thales Group	SHORAD	Crotale-3000	15 km	In service	
Crotale		France	Thales Group	SHORAD	Crotale-4000	15 km	In service	
Operated by Pakistan Navy								
HQ-16		China	SAST	Medium Range	LY-80N	40+ km	In service	Installed on Tughril-class frigates.
RIM-66 Standard		United States	Raytheon	Medium Range	N/A	74 km – 170 km	In service	Installed on Oliver Hazard Perry class.
HQ-7		China	CASC	SHORAD	FM-90N	15 km	In service	Installed on Zulfiquar-class frigates.
HQ-6		China	SAST	SHORAD	LY-60N	18 km	In service	Limited use.
CAMM		UK / Italy	MBDA	Advanced SHORAD	CAMM-ER	45 km	In service	Installed on Babur-class corvettes.

=== Shoulder-fired missiles ===
Operated by Pakistan Armed Forces
Name	Image	Origin	Manufacturer	Type	Variant	Operational range	Status	Note
Operated by Pakistan Army
Anza		Pakistan	GIDS	Man-portable air-defense system	Mk.I	500 m – 6 km	In service	
Anza		Pakistan	GIDS	Man-portable air-defense system	Mk.II	500 m – 6 km	In service	
Anza		Pakistan	GIDS	Man-portable air-defense system	Mk.III	500 m – 6 km	In service	
RBS 70		Sweden	Saab Bofors Dynamics	Man-portable air-defense system	Total 1711 Missiles	250 m – 9 km	In service	The vehicle-mounted application consists of the RBS 70 VLM installed on M113A2 & Mouz APCs.
RBS 70		Sweden	Saab Bofors Dynamics	Man-portable air-defense system	913 Mk 1	250 m – 9 km	In service	The vehicle-mounted application consists of the RBS 70 VLM installed on M113A2 & Mouz APCs.
RBS 70		Sweden	Saab Bofors Dynamics	Man-portable air-defense system	85 Mk 2	250 m – 9 km	In service	The vehicle-mounted application consists of the RBS 70 VLM installed on M113A2 & Mouz APCs.
RBS 70		Sweden	Saab Bofors Dynamics	Man-portable air-defense system	713 Bolide Mk 2)	250 m – 9 km	In service	The vehicle-mounted application consists of the RBS 70 VLM installed on M113A2 & Mouz APCs.
FIM-92 Stinger		United States	General Dynamics	Man-portable air-defense system	FIM-92A	160 m – 8.05 km	In service	
FN-6		China	SAST	Man-portable air-defense system	FN-6	500 m – 6 km	In service	
FN-6		China	SAST	Man-portable air-defense system	FN-16	500 m – 6 km	In service	
Operated by Pakistan Navy
Anza		Pakistan	GIDS	Man-portable air-defense system	Mk.II	500 m – 6 km	In service	In service with Pak Marines and SSG Navy.
FN-6		China	SAST	Man-portable air-defense system	FN-16	500 m – 6 km	In service	
Mistral		France	MBDA France	Man-portable air-defense system		8 km	In service	In service with coastal defense units.

== Air-to-surface missiles ==
Operated by Pakistan Armed Forces
Name	Image	Origin	Manufacturer	Operated by	Type	Operational Range	Status	Note
Ra'ad		Pakistan	Air Weapons Complex	Pakistan Air Force	Air-Launched Cruise Missile	350 km – 550 km	In service	
Ra'ad-II		Pakistan	Air Weapons Complex	Pakistan Air Force	Air-Launched Cruise Missile	650 km	In service	
Taimoor		Pakistan	GIDS	Pakistan Air Force / Pakistan Naval Air Arm	Air-Launched Cruise Missile	600 km	In service	
C-802AK	(Left)	China	CASIC	Pakistan Air Force	Air-Launched Cruise Missile	180 km	In service	
KaGeM V3		Pakistan / Turkey	Baykar / NASTP	Pakistan Air Force	Air-Launched Cruise Missile	150 km	In service	
Burq		Pakistan	NESCOM / GIDS	Pakistan Air Force / Pakistan Army Aviation Corps	Laser-Guided Anti-Tank Missile	8 km	In service	
AGM-114 Hellfire		United States	Lockheed Martin	Pakistan Army Aviation Corps	Laser Guided Anti Armor Missile	11 km	In service	
BGM-71 TOW		United States	RTX	Pakistan Army Aviation Corps	Anti-Tank Guided Missile	3,750 m	In service	
CM-502KG	(Bottom-center)	China	CASIC	Pakistan Army Aviation Corps	Anti-Tank Guided Missile	70 km	In service	
Baktar Shikan		Pakistan / China	GIDS	Pakistan Army Aviation Corps	Anti-Tank Guided Missile	N/A	In service	
MAM-L		Turkey	Roketsan	Pakistan Air Force	Semi Active Laser-Guided Missile	15 km	In service	
MAM-T		Turkey	Roketsan	Pakistan Air Force	Semi Active Laser-Guided Missile	30 – 80 km	In service	
AS-30L		France	Aérospatiale	Pakistan Air Force	Semi-Active Laser homing missile	3 – 12 km	In service	
MAR-1		Brazil	Mectron	Pakistan Air Force	Anti-Radiation Missile	60 km – 100 km	In service	
LD-10		China		Pakistan Air Force	Anti-Radiation Missile	70 km – 100 km	In service	
C-705KD		China	CASIC	Pakistan Air Force	Anti-ship Infrared Homing Missile	140 – 170 km	In service	
CM-400AKG		China	CASIC	Pakistan Air Force	Anti-Radiation Supersonic Cruise Missile	250 km	In service	
AGM-84, Harpoon Block-II		United States	McDonnell Douglas/BDS	Pakistan Air Force / Pakistan Naval Air Arm	Active Radar Homing Guided Missile	220 km	In service	
Exocet AM-39		France	Aérospatiale	Pakistan Air Force / Pakistan Naval Air Arm	GPS / INS Guided Missile	70 km	In service	
AGM-65 Maverick		United States	Raytheon	Pakistan Air Force	Electro-Optical Guided Missile	22 km	In service	

== Air-to-air missiles ==
Operated by Pakistan Air Force
Name	Image	Origin	Manufacturer	Type	Variant	Operational Range	Status	Note
PL-5		China	CAIC	Short-range Infrared Homing	PL-5E	16 – 18 km	In service	Arms the JF-17's.
PL-5		China	CAIC	Short-range Infrared Homing	PL-5EII	16 – 18 km	In service	Arms the JF-17's.
PL-9		China	Luoyang Electro-Optics Technology Development Centre (EOTDC)	Short-range Infrared Homing	PL-9C	22 km	In service	Arms the JF-17's & F-7PG.
PL-10		China	CAIC	Short-range Infrared Homing / Active Radar Homing	PL-10E	20 – 30 km	In service	Arms the JF-17's & J-10CE.
PL-11		China	SAST	Medium-range Semi-Active Radar Homing	PL-11	75 km	In service	Arms the JF-17s.
PL-12		China	Leihua Electronic Technology Research Institute	Medium-range Active Radar Homing, BVR Missile	SD-10A	70 – 100 km	In service	Arms the JF-17's.
PL-15		China	China Airborne Missile Academy (CAMA)	Long-range Active Radar Homing, BVR Missile	PL-15E	145 km	In service	Arms the JF-17's & J-10CE.
PL-15		China	China Airborne Missile Academy (CAMA)	Long-range Active Radar Homing, BVR Missile	PL-15	300 km	In service	Arms the JF-17's & J-10CE.
AIM-7 Sparrow		United States	Raytheon	Medium-range Semi-Active Radar Homing	Unknown	25 – 70 km	In service	Arms the F-16.
AIM-9 Sidewinder		United States	Raytheon	Short-range Infrared Homing	AIM-9B	35 km	In service	Arms the F-16, Mirage 3, Mirage 5 & F-7.
AIM-9 Sidewinder		United States	Raytheon	Short-range Infrared Homing	AIM-9J	35 km	In service	Arms the F-16, Mirage 3, Mirage 5 & F-7.
AIM-9 Sidewinder		United States	Raytheon	Short-range Infrared Homing	AIM-9L	35 km	In service	Arms the F-16, Mirage 3, Mirage 5 & F-7.
AIM-9 Sidewinder		United States	Raytheon	Short-range Infrared Homing	AIM-9P	35 km	In service	Arms the F-16, Mirage 3, Mirage 5 & F-7.
AIM-9 Sidewinder		United States	Raytheon	Short-range Infrared Homing	AIM-9M	35 km	In service	Arms the F-16, Mirage 3, Mirage 5 & F-7.
AIM-120 AMRAAM		United States	Raytheon	Advanced Medium-Range air-to-air missile, BVR Missile	AIM-120C-5	100 km	In service	Arms the F-16.
AIM-120 AMRAAM		United States	Raytheon	Advanced Medium-Range air-to-air missile, BVR Missile	AIM-120D-3	180 km	On order	Arms the F-16.
MAA-1 Piranha		Brazil	Mectron	Short-range Infrared Homing	MAA-1B	12 km	In service	Arms the JF-17's.
R.550 Magic		France	Matra / MBDA	Short-range Infrared Homing	Magic 1	10 km	In service	Arms the Mirage III & Mirage 5.
R.550 Magic		France	Matra / MBDA	Short-range Infrared Homing	Magic 2	20 km	In service	Arms the Mirage III & Mirage 5.
R-Darter		South Africa	Denel Dynamics	Medium-range Active Radar Homing, BVR Missile	--	80 km	In service	Arms the JF-17's.

Operated by Pakistan Army Aviation Corps
Name	Image	Origin	Manufacturer	Type	Operational Range	Status	Note
TY-90	(Right-center)	China	AVIC	Active Radar Homing	8 km	In service	Arms the Z-10ME.

== See also ==
- Pakistani missile research and development program
- List of missiles
- List of missiles by country
