= Samar Mubarakmand =

Pakistani nuclear physicist (born 1942)

Samar Mubarakmand NI HI SI FPAS
- ثمر مبارک مند
- Born: 17 September 1942 (age 84); Rawalpindi, Punjab, then part of British India (now in Punjab, Pakistan)
- Education: St. Anthony's High School
- Alma mater: Government College University; University of Oxford
- Known for: Nuclear deterrence / Atomic program Integrated missile program Experimental Nuclear Physics; Nuclear structure Gamma spectroscopy Fast-neutron reactor
- Spouse: Khalida Samar
- Awards: Nishan-e-Imtiaz (2003); Hilal-e-Imtiaz (1998); Sitara-e-Imtiaz (1992)
- Scientific career
- Fields: Nuclear physics
- Workplaces: Pakistan Atomic Energy Commission; Government College University; Planning Commission; Pakistan Institute of Nuclear Science & Technology
- Doctoral advisor: D. H. Wilkinson

Samar Mubarakmand (Urdu: ثمر مبارک مند; born 17 September 1942) is a Pakistani nuclear physicist, known for his research in gamma spectroscopy and the development of the Charged Particle Accelerator at the Pakistan Institute of Nuclear Science & Technology (PINSTECH).

As of 2026, he is leading the mineral exploration efforts in the Chiniot district, serving as the chairman of the Punjab Mineral Company.

== Early life and education ==
Mubarakmand was born on 17 September 1942, in Rawalpindi in the Punjab Province of British India into a Muslim family that originally hailed from the Hoshiarpur District. He was educated in Lahore and graduated from St. Anthony's High School in 1956.

After passing university entrance examinations, he enrolled at Government College University (GCU), where he studied physics under Tahir Hussain. During university, Mubarakmand was a swimmer and represented GCU at the National Games of Pakistan. In 1960, he graduated with a Bachelor of Science (BSc) in physics, concentrating in experimental physics with a minor in mathematics.

He researched experimental physics under Hussain and built an experimental apparatus for his master's thesis. His thesis included work on gamma‑ray spectrometry, and he conducted an experiment witnessed by nuclear physicist Denys Wilkinson as part of his master's programme. Wilkinson invited Mubarakmand to visit the University of Oxford to pursue further study in experimental physics.

In 1962, Mubarakmand received an Master of Science (MSc) in physics after completing his thesis, Construction of a Gamma-Ray Spectrometer. The same year, he joined the Pakistan Atomic Energy Commission (PAEC) and received a scholarship to study at Oxford, where he joined Wilkinson's group. Mubarakmand helped prepare and commission a 22‑million‑volt particle accelerator. He also studied linear accelerators and, after returning to Pakistan, built one. Besides his studies, he played cricket as a fast bowler for the Oxford University Cricket Club.

During his doctoral studies on nuclear structure at the University of Oxford, Mubarakmand developed and refined a technique for the spectroscopy of fast neutrons released during the nuclear reactions under investigation. This technique has direct applications in conducting cold tests of nuclear devices. In 1966, he completed his doctoral thesis under Wilkinson and was awarded a Doctor of Philosophy (DPhil) in experimental nuclear physics.

== Pakistan Atomic Energy Commission (PAEC) ==
Upon completing his doctoral research in fast neutron spectrometry, Mubarakmand was appointed to head the Diagnostic Group of the Pakistan Atomic Energy Commission (PAEC). Drawing on his experience with high‑energy accelerators, he converted a neutron generator available at PAEC to study nuclear structure and fast neutron scattering.

In 1974, he completed research on fast neutron‑induced reactions and developed experimental techniques for neutron spectroscopy. This work resulted in several publications in the journals Nuclear Physics and Nuclear Instruments and Methods (North‑Holland).

From 1974 to 1977, he served on temporary attachment as director of the Center for Advanced Studies in Physics (CASP) at Government College University, Lahore. During this period, he developed an interest in applications of solid‑state track detectors. In 1976, he presented this work at an international conference at the Max Planck Institute in Munich.

From 1977 to 1980, Mubarakmand conducted research on the use of lasers and on isotope separation in sulphur hexafluoride. He also studied methods of transmitting signals through optical fibres to reduce electromagnetic interference. These studies formed part of the broader development of fibre‑optic technology in Pakistan during that period.

=== 1971 War and Atomic Bomb Project ===
In the 1980s, PAEC was busy developing several designs of nuclear devices and decided that these designs would have to be ratified through cold tests. Mubarakmand was associated with fast neutron spectrometry.

Munir Khan, chairman of the PAEC, selected Mubarakmand as the first choice for head of the Diagnostic Group.

My eyes were set on the mountain in which the test was to be conducted. I experienced a halt in my heartbeat on seeing nothing happening after 32 seconds. But all of a sudden it was a big jolt! We had triumphed....!

— Samar Mubarakmand's describing the blast yield in 1998., Cited source

Several designs of nuclear devices were developed, and their performance was evaluated with a high degree of confidence through cold testing. Many of the tests involved the detection and measurement of fast neutrons emitted in brief bursts lasting less than a microsecond. All developed device designs were subsequently subjected to cold testing and evaluation. In addition, the Diagnostic Group successfully carried out the important task of designing and manufacturing a neutron trigger source based on fusion reactions. This neutron source would trigger a nuclear device in a hot test.

From 1991 to 1994, Mubarakmand headed the Directorate of Technical Development (DTD). During this period, the directorate developed smaller nuclear devices for use with fighter aircraft and other delivery systems, with designs validated through cold testing.

After three years as Director DTD, Mubarakmand was promoted to Director General DTD in 1994. In 1995, he was given the responsibility of Member Technical PAEC, which he held until the year 2000. During the five-year tenure, Mubarakmand, apart from looking after the classified side of the Technical Program of PAEC, also became responsible for the optimal functioning of the centres of Nuclear Medicine, Agriculture, PINSTECH, and New Labs. At New Labs, Mubarakmand and a team of PAEC’s Scientists and Engineers were able to establish and commission Pakistan’s first reprocessing plant for burnt reactor fuel. This led to the production of metallic plutonium at the facility in the year 2000.

Several areas were visited and studied with the help of senior geologists of the PAEC. Chairman Ishfaq Ahmed eventually selected the Chaghai site for conducting Pakistan’s nuclear hot tests. Mubarakmand supervised the installation of diagnostic equipment and other nuclear testing safety infrastructure.

In 2005, Mubarakmand eulogized his memories in an interview with Hamid Mir's Capital Talk television show and said:

"I visited the first weapon-testing laboratories (WTL) at (Chagai District) for the first time in 1981.... When the science experiments were to be conducted, our science teams went there on 20th May, and again on 28th May, in the early morning, the WTL iron-steel tunnels were (electronically) plugged in and the preparation for the tests' experiments were complete, and on 28th May, around 15:15hrs, was the time selected for testings. So, at that time, at around 14:45hrs, some of our high profiled guests arrived to witness the (science) experiments that were soon to be tests, and Qadeer Khan was also one of them.... It was the first visit of his life to any of Chagai's Weapon-testing laboratories. (Abdul Qadeer) came at the invitation of the Chairman of the PAEC, Ishfaq Ahmad, and (Abdul Qadeer) arrived 15 minutes prior to the (science) experiments that were to be conducted..."

— Samar Mubarakmand, commenting on Abdul Qadeer Khan's role in atomic bomb project,

Recalling Munir Ahmad Khan and the PAEC's role in relation to the atomic bomb project priority dispute, Mubarakmand later said that:

"As many as nineteen steps were involved in the making of a nuclear weapon ranging from exploration of uranium to the finished device and its trigger mechanism. The technological and manpower infrastructure for eighteen out of these nineteen steps were provided by PAEC under the leadership of Munir Ahmad Khan who led it for nearly two decades from 1972 to 1991. Today all the major key scientific organizations linked to the country's security like PAEC, the Kahuta Research Labs and the strategic production complex were run and operated by Pakistani professionals produced by the policies of PAEC both under him and Usmani of producing indigenous trained manpower. Pakistan's nuclear capability was confirmed the day in 1983 when PAEC carried out cold nuclear tests under the guidance and stewardship of Munir Ahmad Khan. The tests however, were not publicly announced because of the international environment of stiff sanctions against countries, which sought to acquire nuclear capability...."

— Samar Mubarakmand, Eulogizing Munir Khan's and PAEC's role on the development of the atomic bomb project,

=== Pakistan’s missile program ===
In the 1990s, Mubarakmand worked to advance the space program and led a team of engineers that developed the Shaheen-I missile. He was the founding director of the National Defence Complex (NDC), which initiated work on the Shaheen‑I and garnered support for the program. Funding for the program was secured by the military, and Mubarakmand oversaw the development of the solid-fuel rocket booster.

Initiated in 1987 by the Pakistan Ministry of Defence in response to India's Integrated Guided Missile Development Programme, Pakistan’s spin‑off missile program was further pursued in 1993 under Prime Minister Benazir Bhutto. The Shaheen‑I missile was test‑fired in 1999 by a team of engineers led by Mubarakmand. Subsequently, Shaheen-II and Shaheen-III were test‑fired, with ranges of 2,000 km and 2,750 km, respectively.

Other strategic systems, including Babur and Ghaznavi, were also developed by teams he led. Development of the Babur cruise missile (range ~700 km) proceeded in the same period; multiple boost‑phase and flight‑phase tests evaluated performance and potential roles in national defence strategy. Mubarakmand retired from the NESCOM in November 2007.

In 2008, he joined the Planning Commission of Pakistan, where he advocated for peaceful uses of the space program. In 2009, he announced work on Paksat-1R, the country's first geostationary satellite, which was launched in 2011. The satellite was described as supporting monitoring of agriculture, mineral resources, and weather conditions; he also stated that there were sufficient funds for defence, nuclear, and space programs. It was launched in 2011 from the Xichang Satellite Launch Centre in China. His relations with Dr Abdul Qadeer Khan were often tense over scientific issues.

=== Thar Coal Project ===
In 2013, Mubarakmand assisted the Provincial Government of Balochistan in mineral extraction. He lobbied heavily for the implementation of the Thar coal project initiated by the Provincial Government of Sindh despite strong public criticism by Abdul Qadeer Khan. In 2015, a breakthrough in the Thar coal project was reported by the media. According to Mubarakmand, the Thar coal reserves have been projected to supply power for several decades, subject to development and policy implementation. When speaking to a large crowd at Cadet College Fateh Jang, he said that he had developed a solution to the growing power outage and was now waiting for the government to put it into action.

=== Reko Diq Copper Gold Project ===
In December 2020, the Tethyan Cooper Company (TCC) approached the High Court of Justice in the British Virgin Islands for the enforcement of the $5.97 billion award against Pakistan by the International Centre for Settlement of Investment Disputes (ICSID) in the Reko Diq case.

A senior official revealed that the "misstatement" of Mubarakmand before the Supreme Court tribunal, in which he in 2011 had claimed that the Reko Diq gold mines would fetch Pakistan around $2.5 billion annually, was one of the main reasons behind the Supreme Court's decision on 7 January 2013. On that date, a three-member bench of the apex court, headed by then Chief Justice Iftikhar Muhammad Chaudhry, declared the Chagai Hills Exploration Joint Venture Agreement (Chejva) "illegal, void" and non-binding, causing the ICSID to penalize Pakistan. Mubarakmand projected that Reko Diq and other reserves could generate up to $131 billion over the mine’s lifetime. The tribunal relied on his statement.

== State honors ==
Mubarakmand has been conferred with state honors for his services to the country by the Government of Pakistan. He is the recipient of the Sitara-e-Imtiaz (1992); Hilal-e-Imtiaz (1998); and the Nishan-e-Imtiaz (2003), which is the highest civil honor of Pakistan. Additionally, he is a Fellow of the Pakistan Academy of Sciences (PAS), inducted by Ishfaq Ahmad in 2000.

- Nishan-e-Imtiaz (2003)
- Hilal-e-Imtiaz (1998)
- Sitara-e-Imtiaz (1992)
- PAS Nazir Ahmad Award (2005)
- International Scientist of the Year (2007)
- Life Member, Pakistan Nuclear Society
- Roll of Honour GCU (1962)
- Fellow, Pakistan Mathematical Society (2003)

== Scientific journals and papers ==
=== Research publications ===
- Aspects of a-emission from the bombardment of ^{58}Ni with 14.7 MeV neutrons, by Naeem Ahmad Khan, Samar Mubarakmand and Masud Ahmed, Journal of Nuclear Physics, PINSTECH.
- Cross-section measurements with a neutron generator by Samar Mubarakmand, Masud Ahmad, M. Anwar and M. S. Chaudhry.
- Some characteristic differences between the etch pits due to ^{86}Rn and ^{232} Th α particles in CA80–15 and LR–115 cellulose nitrate track detectors, by Hameed Ahmad Khan, M. Afzal, P. Chaudhary, Samar Mubarakmand, F. I. Nagi and A. Waheed, Journal of Isotopic Radiation, PINSTECH (1977).
- Application of glass solid state nuclear track detectors in the measurement of the ^{+} particle fission cross–section of uranium, by Samar Mubarakmand, K. Rashid, P. Chaudhry and Hameed Ahmad Khan, Methods of Nuclear Instrumentation (1977).
- Etching of glass solid state nuclear track detectors in aqueous solutions of (^{4}NH)^{2}HF, NaOH and KOH, by Hameed Ahmad Khan, R. A. Akbar, A. Waheed, P. Chaudhry and Samar Mubarakmand, Journal of Isotopic Radiation, PINSTECH (1978).

== See also ==
- Pakistan and weapons of mass destruction
- Shaheen (missile)
- Chagai-I
- Chagai-II
- Kirana Hills
