= Shaheen-III =

Pakistani medium-range ballistic missile (MRBM)

- Type: MRBM
- Place of origin: Pakistan

Service history
- In service: 2015–present
- Used by: Pakistan Army (Army Strategic Forces Command)

Production history
- Designer: National Engineering & Scientific Commission (NESCOM)
- Designed: 2003–2013
- Manufacturer: National Engineering & Scientific Commission
- Variants: Ababeel

Specifications (Technical data)
- Length: 19.30 m (63.3 ft)
- Diameter: 1.40 m (4.6 ft)
- Maximum firing range: 2,750 km (1,710 mi)
- Warhead: HE/NE
- Blast yield: >50 kilotons of TNT (210 TJ)
- Engine: Multi-stage
- Transmission: Automatic
- Suspension: WS21200 16WD (with Pakistani military markings)
- Propellant: Solid-fuel
- Operational range: 2,750 kilometres (1,710 mi)
- Guidance system: Inertial, Terminal,
- Launch platform: Transporter erector launcher (TEL), launch pad

The Shaheen-III (شاہین– ۳ ; (Note: شاہین ISO: Śāhīn) lit. Falcon), is a land-based medium-range ballistic missile (MRBM) operated by the Pakistan Army, which first test-fired the weapon on 9 March 2015.

Development began in secrecy in the early 2000s in response to India's Agni-III, Shaheen was successfully tested on 9 March 2015 with a range of 2,750 km (1,710 mi), which enables it to strike all of India and reach deep into the Middle East parts of North Africa. The Shaheen-III, according to its program manager, the Strategic Plans Division, is "18 times faster than speed of sound and designed to reach the Indian islands of Andaman and Nicobar so that India cannot use them as "strategic bases" to establish a second strike capability."

Range of the Shaheen-III missile

The Shaheen program is composed of the solid-fuel system in contrast to the Ghauri program that is primarily based on liquid-fuel system. With the successful launch of the Shaheen-III, it surpasses the range of Shaheen-II— hence, it is the longest-range missile to be launched by the Pakistani military.

Its deployment has not been commented by the Pakistani military but Shaheen-III is currently deemed as operational in the strategic command of Pakistan Army.

== Overview ==
=== Development history ===
Development of a long-range space launch vehicle began in 1999 with an aim of a rocket engines reaching the range of 2,750 km (1,710 mi) to 3,000 km (1,900 mi). The Indian military had moved its strategic commands to east and the range of 2,750 km (1,710 mi) was determined by a need to be able to target the Nicobar and Andaman Islands in the eastern part of the Indian Ocean that are "developed as strategic bases" where "Indian military might think of putting its weapons", according to Shaheen-III's program manager, the Strategic Plans Division (SPD). With this mission, Shaheen-III was actively pursued along with Ghauri-III'.

In 2000, the SUPARCO concluded at least two design studies for its space launch vehicle. Initially, there were two earlier designs were shown in IDEAS held in 2002 and its design was centered on developing a space booster based on the design technologies of the Shaheen-I. Since then, Shaheen owes its existence largely to the joint efforts led by NDC of NESCOM and Space Research Commission.

The Shaheen-III was shrouded in top secrecy and very little information was available to the public, mostly provided in 2002 IDEAS. Majority of the efforts and funding was being made available to Ghauri-III to seek strike in Eastern region of India. In May 2000, the Ghauri-III was cancelled due to its less advance and lack of technological gain. Despite strong advocacy by Abdul Qadeer Khan for the Ghauri-III program made to be feasible, the program was terminated by then-President Pervez Musharraf who made the funding available for Shaheen-III program which was to be led under Samar Mubarakmand.

The Shaheen-III was initially purposed as the space booster for the space program to make it possible for installing the satellite payload applications. In a press conference held in Lahore in 2009, Samar Mubarakmand stated that: "Pakistan would launch its own satellite in April 2011." Although no confirmation or denial of Shaheen program's existence was given by Dr. Mubarakmand, the rumors and speculations yet to be continued for the existence of the program.

After years of speculations, the Shaheen-III was eventually revealed and tested on 9 March 2015 with a 2750 km (1700-mile) range. The Shaheen-III uses the Pakistan-engineered WS21200 transporter erector launcher (TEL) manufactured in China by Wanshan Special Vehicle.

== Testing ==
On 9 March 2015, the ISPR released a press statement notifying the successful testing of the Shaheen-III that was conducted from the southern coast off the Indian Ocean.

Military officials from JS HQ, SPD scientists and engineers, oversaw the launch of the system and witnessed the impact point in the Arabian Sea. Reports summed up by NTI, there had been series of testing's taken place of the rocket engine nozzles before the eventual tests took place in 2015.

On 20 January 2021, the ISPR released a press statement stating that a successful test of Shaheen-III aimed at "revalidating various design & tech parameters of weapon system" was conducted.

On 9 April 2022, the ISPR released a press statement stating that a successful test of Shaheen-III aimed at "re-validating various design and technical parameters of the weapon system" was conducted.

== Analysis ==
=== Strategic prospect ===
Several Pakistani nuclear and military strategists reportedly quoted that the "Shaheen-III has a range greater than that of any other missile system in-service with Pakistan. Earlier testings of Shaheen-III had the maximum range of about 2,500 km, which meant it can reach all parts of India, even the northeastern and eastern frontier.

Air Marshal Shahid Latif, a retired senior commander in the Pakistan Air Force, was reported to have said: "Now, India doesn't have its safe havens any more. It's all a reaction to India, which has now gone even for tests of extra-regional missiles. It sends a [very] loud message: If you hurt us, we are going to hurt you back!".

Mansoor Ahmad, a professor of strategic studies at the Islamabad's Quaid-i-Azam University, stated, "Pakistan's military, however, is not interested in a "tit-for-tat" arms race with India," and speculated that developmental work may be under progress to make missile capable of delivering multiple warheads which would make them harder to defend against. Pakistan would later test the Ababeel missile with this capability.

=== Peace prospect ===
In a views of political scientist, Dr. Farrukh Saleem, the Shaheen-III seems to be a reaction to Integrated Guided Missile Development Program. Dr. Saleem, on the other hand, stressed that: "Pakistan seem to be aiming at competing with India and Pakistan's aims seem to revolve around the creation of a credible deterrence, and a credible deterrence is bound to strengthen strategic stability."

== See also ==
- Pakistan and its Nuclear Deterrent Program
- Medium-range ballistic missile
- Ababeel, a development of the Shaheen-III with an enlarged payload fairing containing a MIRV bus
