= Ababeel (missile) =

Pakistani Ballistic Missile

Ababeel Missile
- Type: MIRV surface-to-surface missile ballistic missile
- Place of origin: Pakistan

Service history
- In service: 2017–Present
- Used by: Pakistan Army (Army Strategic Forces Command)

Production history
- Designed: 2010–2017
- Manufacturer: National Engineering & Scientific Commission (NESCOM)

Specifications (Technical data)
- Height: 21.5 m (71 ft)
- Diameter: 1.80 m (5.9 ft) (Tip), 1.40 m (4.6 ft) (Body)
- Maximum firing range: 2,200 km (1,400 mi)
- Warhead: HE/NE
- Warhead weight: 3-8 MIRVs; 3 Warheads of 500kg each (standard); 5 Warheads of 300kg each 8 Warheads of 185kg each
- Blast yield: >50 kilotons of TNT (210 TJ)
- Transmission: Automatic
- Suspension: WS21200 16WD (With Pakistani military markings)
- Propellant: Solid-fuel
- Guidance system: Inertial, Terminal
- Launch platform: Transporter erector launcher (TEL), Launch pad

Ababeel Missile (Urdu: اَبَابِیل, romanized: abābīl) or the Ababeel Weapon System is an MIRV surface-to-surface medium-range ballistic missile in development by Pakistan. It is "aimed at ensuring survivability of Pakistan's ballistic missiles in the growing regional Ballistic Missile Defense (BMD) environment", in response to the Indian anti-ballistic missile systems.

BBC reported in 2010 that Pakistan is in the advance stages of developing MIRV technology with the help from the Chinese for its missiles.

The National Interest called Ababeel "the Ultimate Nuclear Missile." The missile's stated purpose is to defeat Indian ballistic missile defense systems.

The missile has a length of 21.5 meters and a diameter of 1.7 meters and is designed to carry both conventional and nuclear warheads. It has multiple independently targetable reentry vehicles (MIRV), demonstrating South Asia’s first MIRV payload. It has a maximum range of 2,200 kilometres (1,400 mi).

Some sources suggest that Ababeel is a further development of the Shaheen-III airframe and solid-fuel motors, but with a payload fairing of enlarged diameter to accept the MIRV warhead. The second stage is also lengthened.

The first publicly announced test launch was conducted on 24 January 2017. As of June 2017 no missiles were thought to be operationally deployed.

On 18 October 2023, Pakistan announced it had conducted another test of the missile, referring to it as the "Ababeel Weapon System".

== See also ==
- List of missiles of Pakistan
- MIRV
- Shaheen-III
