= National Engineering & Scientific Commission =

Pakistani aerospace & defence manufacturer

- Trade name: NESCOM
- Type: SOE
- Industry: Aerospace; Defense; Regulatory
- Predecessor: Project Management Organization
- Founded: 2000; 26 years ago
- Founder: Government of Pakistan
- Headquarters: Islamabad, Pakistan
- Area served: Pakistan
- Key people: Dr. Raza Samar (Chairman)
- Owner: Government of Pakistan
- Number of employees: ~16,000 (2008)

The National Engineering & Scientific Commission is a Pakistani national defense contractor and aerospace manufacturer, headquartered in Islamabad, Pakistan.

The NESCOM manages and operates four divisions involved in the national security, and its revenues generated directly from the federal government of the Pakistan. The NESCOM is also a contractor for the National Command Authority and the Ministry of Defence (MoD), in which, the commission provides the management, technical, and operational services to the national defence agencies of Pakistan as their prime contractor.

== History ==
The National Engineering & Scientific Commission (NESCOM) was commissioned to provide management, technical, and operations research services to oversee the funding and development direction of military-led research complexes engaged in the weapons delivery systems and the national defense.

In February 2000, the federal government of Pakistan announced to form a civilian commission together with the establishment of the National Command Authority (NCA), a federal agency to safeguard the national defense through military applications of nuclear science Initially, it was the army-led Project Management Organization (PMO) that was leading the weapons research and development complexes and had no virtual management oversights in other military research complexes. In 2001, the federal government of Pakistan appointed its first civilian chairman to oversee the weapons research and development of military-led complexes.

The NESCOM manages the research output of the army-led National Development Complex (NDC), air force-led Air Weapons Complex (AWC), navy-led Maritime Technologies Complex (MTC) while providing support to the Project Management Organization (PMO).

In early 2000s, the NESCOM proved its operational and management capabilities by successfully managing army's Shaheen program and, since then, has been a prime managing and operating contractor for aerospace and national defense for the government of Pakistan.

Since its establishment, the NESCOM's overarching mission is to promote Pakistan's "proficiencies in nuclear and ballistic missile development and production" with a "focus on developing conventional military hardware for the Pakistani military and export markets."

== Organization ==
The NESCOM is primarily organized to manage and oversee the research output of four weapons development complexes:

- Project Management Organization (PMO) – project management division under the direction of JS HQ.
- National Defence Complex (NDC) – Pakistan Army weapons development complex.
- Air Weapons Complex (AWC) – Pakistan Air Force weapons development complex.
- Maritime Technologies Complex (MTC) – Pakistan Navy weapons development complex.

In addition, the NESCOM has extended managerial partnership with:

- Defence Science and Technology Organization (DESTO) on CBRN defense.
- National Electronics Complex of Pakistan (NECOP) on electronic warfare defense measures.

== Research areas ==
- Aerospace
- Missiles and rockets
- Ammunition
- Naval systems

== Notable projects ==
=== Ballistic Missile Systems ===
- Nasr – solid-fueled hypersonic Tactical ballistic missile with a range of 70 – 90 km.
- Abdali – solid-fueled Short-range ballistic missile with a range of 200 – 450 km.
- Ghaznavi – short-range ballistic missile system with a range of 320 km.
- Shaheen-I – solid-fueledShort-range ballistic missile with a reported range of 900 km. The Shaheen was Pakistan's first solid-fueled missile. The missile project began in 1995, and the development and design were carried out by NESCOM's predecessor, the National Development Complex (NDC).
- Shaheen-IA – an upgraded version of the Shaheen-I with a range of 1000 km. The upgrade was supposedly carried out by NESCOM in the early 2000s and supposedly included a terminal guidance system, improved radar-avoidance capability and stealth features.
- Ababeel – solid-fueled medium-range ballistic missile MIRV capable with a reported range of 2,200 km.
- Shaheen-II – solid-fueled medium-range ballistic missile with a reported range of 2,500 km.
- Shaheen-III – solid-fueled medium-range ballistic missile with a reported range of 2,750 km.

=== Land-based Guided Missile Systems ===
- Babur-I – ground-launched anti-ship and land attack cruise missile with a reported range of 700 – 900 km.
- Babur-II – an upgraded ground-launched anti-ship and land attack cruise missile of Babur-I with a reported range of 750 km.

=== Ship-based guided missile systems ===
- Harbah – ship-launched and ground-launched anti-ship and land attack cruise missile with an estimated range of 280 km.

=== Submarine-based guided missile systems ===
- Babur-III – submarine-launched anti-ship and land attack cruise missile derived from Babur-II with a reported range of 450 km.

=== Air-to-surface guided missile systems ===
- Burq – air-launched laser-guided missile carried on the Burraq UCAV, reported range of 8 to12 km
- Ra'ad – air-Launched Cruise Missile with an original range of 350 km
- Ra'ad-II – an upgraded air-Launched Cruise Missile of Ra'ad reported range of 600 km

=== Air-to-Air Missiles ===
- FAAZ – BVR capable
- Air-to-air missile research – It was reported in November 2001 that the Aerospace Division of NDC was doing "preliminary studies" for developing a new medium range air-to-air missile. The report suggested that the missile may use active radar homing.

=== Guided bombs ===
- H-2 SOW – Precision-guided munition
- H-4 SOW – Precision-guided munition

=== Unguided bombs ===
- 250 kg – Pre-fragmented bomb
- 250 kg Mk.82 – General-purpose bomb
- 500 kg Mk.83 – General-purpose bomb
- 1000 kg Mk.84 – General-purpose bomb
- HAFR-1 – Anti-runway penetration bomb
- HAFR-2 – Anti-runway penetration bomb
- RPB-1 – Anti-runway penetration bomb (possibly modified variants of the Matra Durandal)
- 6 kg, 11 kg – Practice bombs

=== Depleted uranium ammunition ===
- 105 mm anti-tank round – a DU APFSDS anti-tank round developed to be fired by Type 59 tanks (upgraded with 105 mm guns) in service with the Pakistan Army. Reported to have a muzzle velocity of 1,450 m/s and be capable of penetrating 450 mm of rolled homogeneous armour (RHA) at an unspecified range.
- Naiza (125 mm anti-tank round) – a DU APFSDS anti-tank round developed to be fired by T-80UD tanks in service with the Pakistan Army. A model of the round was put on display at the IDEX 2001 exhibition in the United Arab Emirates and it was stated to have a DU long rod penetrator, performance 25% greater than NDC's 105 mm DU round and a saddle-type sabot with re-arranged forward bore-rider for more accurate alignment with the T-80UD's autoloader. Displayed at IDEAS 2002 alongside DU rounds produced by other Pakistani organisations. Reportedly named "Naiza", made compatible with the T-80UD tank and stated to be capable of penetrating 550 mm of RHA.

=== Unmanned aerial vehicles ===
- Burraq – unmanned combat aerial vehicle (UCAV)
- Shahpar – Unmanned aerial vehicle (UAV)

=== Naval systems ===
- Starfish Naval Mine – a naval mine that targets submarines and ships, details on the mine were first released in 2001. Can be deployed by aircraft, ships and submarines. Makes use of solid state electronics. The mine's attack modes are controlled by a microprocessor which uses magnetic, acoustic and pressure sensors to analyse a potential target's signature. Sensors are mounted flush to both ends of the mine's cylindrical (barrel) shape. It is unknown if the mine has a self-destruct mechanism. Weight: 767 kg, warhead: 500 kg HE (PBX charge), storage life: 20 years.
- MSL Advanced Towed Array Sonar (ATAS) – a towed array sonar developed by Maritime Systems Ltd. (MSL) and MTC to replace old systems in service with the Pakistan Navy and for export. Project started during the 1990s, Commodore Sarfraz appointed as program chief. System was designed to cope with Arabian Sea environment and is stated to be superior to foreign systems being offered for export. Expected to be installed on Agosta 70 and Agosta 90B class submarines currently in service with the Pakistan Navy, also being integrated with the Agosta 90B's SUBTICS combat management system, as well as future vessels to be acquired by the Pakistan Navy such as new submarines and corvettes.
- Naval Training Simulator – programmable training system. Simulates maritime sensors and weapon systems of aircraft, warships and submarines under any weather or sea conditions. Installed on the Jalalat II class fast attack craft of the Pakistan Navy.
- Shore-based/ship-based electronic warfare system
- Ship-borne display consoles
