= Shaheen-II =

Medium-range ballistic missile

Hatf-VI Shaheen-II
- Type: MRBM
- Place of origin: Pakistan

Service history
- In service: 2014–Present
- Used by: Pakistan Army: Army Strategic Forces Command

Production history
- Designer: National Engineering & Scientific Commission
- Designed: 2000–2013
- Manufacturer: National Engineering & Scientific Commission

Specifications (Technical data)
- Mass: 23,600 kg (52,000 lb)
- Length: 17.2 m (680 in)
- Diameter: 1.4 m (55 in)
- Maximum firing range: 2,500 km (1,600 mi)
- Warhead: HE/NE
- Warhead weight: 1,230 kg (2,710 lb)
- Blast yield: >40 kilotons of TNT (170 TJ)
- Engine: Two-stage
- Transmission: Automatic
- Suspension: MAZ-547A 12WD (With Pakistani military markings)
- Propellant: Solid-propellant
- Guidance system: Inertial, Terminal
- Accuracy: <350 m (1,150 ft) CEP
- Launch platform: Transporter erector launcher (TEL), launch pad

The Shaheen-II (Urdu:شاهين–اا; Military designation: Hatf-VI, Trans: Target-6), is a land-based medium-range ballistic missile currently deployed in military service with the strategic command of the Pakistan Army.

Designed and developed by the National Engineering & Scientific Commission, the Shaheen-II provides long-range nuclear weapons delivery, and is described by the Pakistani military as a "highly capable missile which fully meets Pakistan's strategic needs towards maintenance of desired deterrence stability in the region."

The National Air and Space Intelligence Center of the United States Air Force estimates that "as of 2017 fewer than 50 Shaheen-II were operationally deployed.

== Description ==
Development and design of the Shaheen-II was influenced by Pakistan's need for surface-based second strike capability in case of the Pakistani military facing the Indian Army in a large-scale conventional war. Since 2000, the United States had prior knowledge of such program and was able to confirm it in 2005, when six-axled-ten-wheel MAZ vehicle was shown in the military barracks.

To Indian defense observers, Shaheen-II is seen as the "backbone of Pakistan's survivability with ground-based second strike capability."

=== Re-entry design ===
The re-entry vehicle carried by the Shaheen-II missile has a mass of between 700 kg (1,500 lb)—1,250 kg (2,760 lb), which includes the mass of a nuclear warhead and a terminal guidance system.

Much of its engineering data, that is acceptable for public release, is provided by the Pakistani military and compiled by the American independent think tanks. This re-entry vehicle is unlike that of the Shaheen I in that it has four moving delta control fins at the rear and small solid-liquid-propellant side thrust motors, which are used to orient the re-entry vehicle after the booster stage is depleted or before re-entry to improve accuracy by providing stabilization during the terminal phase. This can also be used to fly evasive manoeuvres, making it problematic for existing anti-ballistic missile countermeasures to successfully intercept the missile. The Shaheen II warhead may change its trajectory several times during re-entry and during the terminal phase, effectively preventing radar systems from pre-calculating intercept points.

=== Ground-based deterrence ===
The Shaheen-II mobility is transported through is similar to SS-16 RT21 Temp/SS-16 Sinner displayed here, a 12WD MAZ truck.

Due to Pakistan's engineering feat, the American sources leveled serious allegations against China, and often compares the missile to the Chinese DF-11 or DF-25. The Pakistani government has consistently refuted claims of Chinese assistance, maintaining that the Shaheen-II was an indigenous design from 2000. An extensive series of trials and error led to its final deployment in 2014, with the secrecy of the programme preserved through domestic development. Further evidence provided through a press video shown by its designing contractor, NESCOM, at the IDEAS conference in 2004, the missile can achieve "surgical precision". Between 2004–2010, Pakistani contractors committed to series of testing of the Shaheen-II that included its engine, propellent, on-board computers, programming, and vehicle testing.

The re-entry vehicle is also stated to utilize a GPS satellite guidance system to provide updates on its position, further improving its accuracy and reducing the CEP to 200 m (660 ft)—300 m (980 ft). This has led to speculation that Shaheen-II incorporates a satellite navigation update system and/or a post separation attitude correction system to provide terminal course correction, which "may indicate a CEP of much less than 300 m (980 ft)." According to King's College London, "the current capability of Pakistani missiles is built around radar seekers."

== See also ==
Related developments

- Shaheen-I
- Shaheen-III

Related lists

- List of missiles of Pakistan
- Medium-range ballistic missile
