= Shaheen-I =

Pakistani short-range ballistic missile

Hatf-IV Shaheen
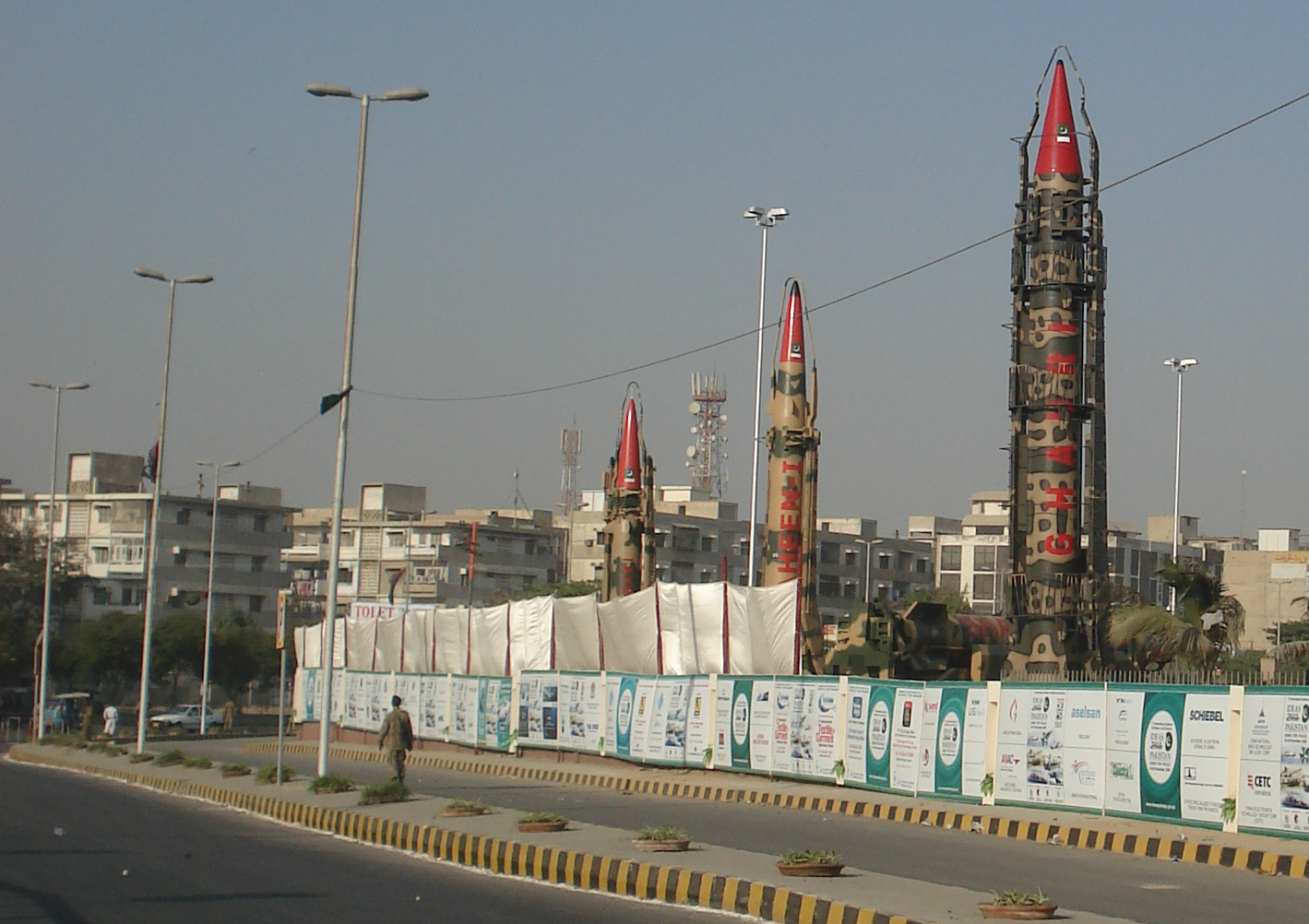
- The Hatf-IV Shaheen (middle) in Karachi, ca. 2008
- Type: SRBM
- Place of origin: Pakistan

Service history
- In service: 2003–Present
- Used by: Pakistan Army: (Army Strategic Forces Command)

Production history
- Designer: National Defence Complex
- Designed: 1995–99
- Manufacturer: National Defence Complex; National Engineering & Scientific Commission
- Variants: Shaheen-I: 700Km; Shaheen-IA: 1000Km

Specifications (Technical data)
- Mass: 9,500 kg (20,900 lb)
- Length: 12.0 m (470 in)
- Diameter: 1.0 m (39 in)
- Maximum firing range: 750 km (470 mi)—900 km (560 mi)
- Warhead: HE/ICM/NE
- Warhead weight: 700 kg (1,500 lb) (Shaheen-I); 1,000 kg (2,200 lb) (Shaheen-IA)
- Blast yield: 35 kilotons of TNT (150 TJ) (Shaheen-I); 40 kilotons of TNT (170 TJ) (Shaheen-IA)
- Engine: Single-stage
- Transmission: Automatic
- Suspension: MAZ-7310 8WD (With Pakistani military markings)
- Propellant: Solid-propellant
- Operational range: 790 km (490 mi)–900 km (560 mi)
- Guidance system: Inertial, Terminal
- Accuracy: <50 m (160 ft) CEP
- Launch platform: Transporter erector launcher (TEL), launch pad

The Shaheen-I (Urdu: شاہين-ا; Military designation: Hatf–IV, Translit.: Target-4), is a land-based short-range ballistic missile designed and developed by the National Defence Complex and National Engineering & Science Commission.

The system is currently deployed in military service with strategic commands of the Pakistan Army as Hatf-IV, and it is dedicated and named after a species of Falcon found in the mountain ranges of Pakistan.

== Description ==
=== Codename ===
The JS HQ officially adopted the codename of the missile as "Hatf–IV. It has been reported that it was Prime Minister Nawaz Sharif who suggested the name "Shaheen" by taking a cue from philosopher Iqbal's poetic symbol Shaheen Falcon. After being test fired in 1999, JS HQ officially codenamed the missile as "Hatf–IV Shaheen. Though its variants are now known as Shaheen-I and Shaheen-IA.

=== Shaheen 1 ===
The Shaheen-I is a nuclear weapons-delivery capable and short-range ballistic missile with a range of 750 km (470 mi); it is propelled by two-stage solid-fuel rocket motor. The Shaheen-I is said to be extremely accurate and precise with Pakistani military data stating that its CEP is between 25 m (82 ft)–50 m (160 ft). This is partly due to a post-separation attitude correction system.

This system would allow the missile to modify its trajectory, improving accuracy and, along with the stealthy warhead shaping, giving some capability to evade missile defence systems. It is based on terminal guidance system technology, which improves warhead accuracy by firing small thrusters to adjust the warhead's trajectory and uses satellite navigation systems to help find the target. Such systems would allow the Shaheen to be used against strategic targets without requiring a nuclear warhead to ensure the target's destruction.

=== Shaheen 1A ===
The Shaheen-1A is a strategic nuclear weapon delivery-capable system that was first test fired at Air Force's Flight Test Range on 7 April 2012. Initially, the ISPR and the American media identified this missile as medium-range ballistic missile, but the Pakistani military confirms that it is a short-range missile with extended range.

No data had been shared by the military that led the speculations about the missile's capabilities. However, a civilian analyst on military affairs in Islamabad reportedly noted that this missile could be equipped with warheads designed to evade missile defense systems. The speed of the Shaheen 1A also provides an extremely high impact speed for nearby targets, enabling it to avoid any anti-ballistic missile defenses that may develop in the immediate region. A European diplomat in Islamabad mentioned that the Shaheen-1A missile seems to have an improved ability to strike at its targets. It also has a more powerful engine, which means that it travels at scramjet speeds and can strike at longer distances than Shaheen-1.

On 25 April 2012, the ISPR revealed more information about the missile, noting that the weight is approximately 10,000 kg, slightly heavier than its predecessor and can carry a single 1000 kg warhead. In addition, the Shaheen IA primarily contains sophisticated automated refueling and advanced stealth technology features that were not present in its previous version to avoid detections from radars. All three Shaheen missiles, Shaheen I, Shaheen 1A and Shaheen II are reportedly equipped with the latest PSAC (Post-Separation Attitude Correction) system. This is a feature which consists of small thrusters that can adjust the warhead trajectory for greater accuracy and evading anti-ballistic missile defence systems. The features of the missile could also serve as a testbed of features which could be implemented on the yet to be deployed Shaheen III. Shaheen-1 A (Hatf IV), with a range of 900 km, was test-fired on 17 November 2014.

== Operational history ==
Development on Shaheen program began in 1995 and the program went to National Development Complex bureau of the National Engineering and Scientific Commission (NESCOM). The program was put under Dr. Samar Mubarakmand– a nuclear physicist and a fluid dynamicist who delegated the program to country's scientists and engineers. Necessary funding for the program were secured by the military, and the development on rocket engine and its eventually testing began to be utilized by the SUPARCO.

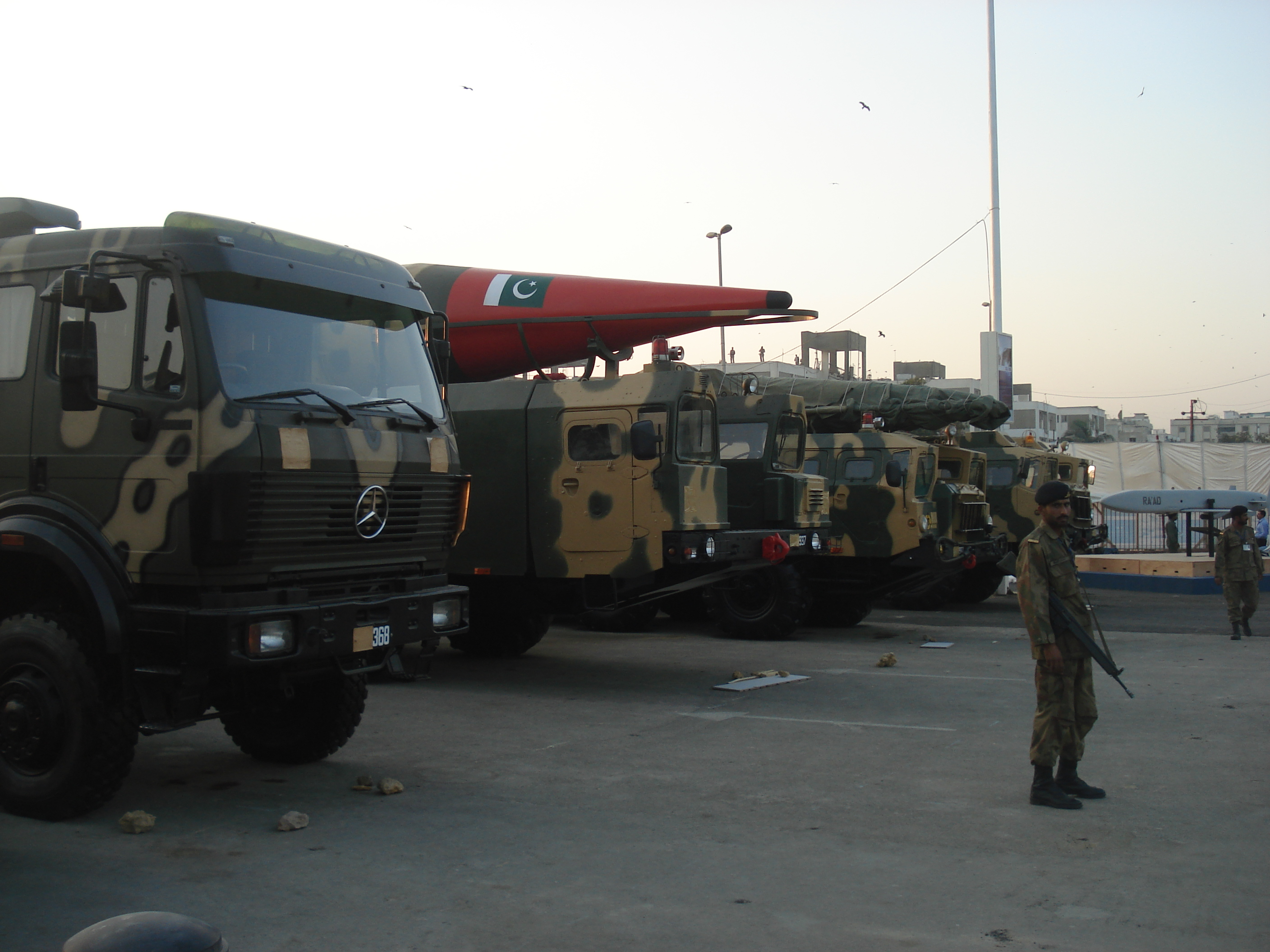
The transport vehicles of Shaheen-I, visible with Pakistani military markings, ca. 2008.

In the memoirs of scientists who worked on the program maintained that "Shaheen was a very difficult program and the development of this system has given maximum accuracy– a 100% capability of destroying its target." The program's original goal was to developed a supersonic missile that it would be impossible for any missile defense system could intercept it. Solid-fuel systems for the guided missiles are very difficult to develop and Pakistani scientists closely monitored the Indian development of the Agni-II missile. The Space Research Commission continued to modifies the designs, and repeatedly tests the Solid-fuel rocket motors on multiple occasions.

The Shaheen-I was test fired on 15 April 1999 by a joint team of NDC and SUPARCO led under Dr. Samar Mubarakmand from the Sonmiani Test Range, which was termed as "highly successfully". At the height of military standoff with India in 2002, another test took place and it was quoted by Information minister Nisar Memon as "part of technical requirements" and unrelated to the military confrontation in Kashmir. On 8 October 2003, the Shaheen-I was again [test fired for a third time from an undisclosed location, as the ISPR stated: "The test is part of the ongoing series of tests of Pakistan's indigenous missile systems."

The Shaheen-I and Shaheen-IA are transported with Pakistan-reverse engineered former Soviet MAZ-7310 military trucks with visible Pakistani military markings since 2003. Another was tested on 8 May 2010 The Shaheen 1A was test fired on 25 April 2012. On April 10, 2013, Pakistan tested another Shaheen 1A.

== See also ==
- Ballistic missile
- Solid fuel rocket
- NESCOM
- Pakistan and weapons of mass destruction

Related developments

- Shaheen II
- Shaheen III

Related lists

- List of missiles
