= Ra'ad (air-launched cruise missile) =

Pakistani air-launched cruise missile

Hatf-VIII Ra'ad
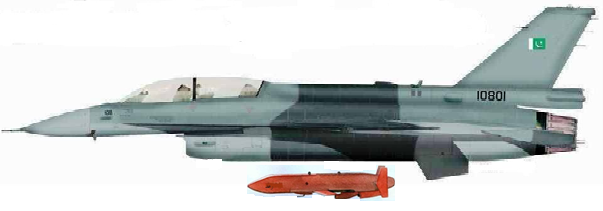
- The Hatf-VIII Ra'ad on a Pakistan Air Force's F-16D platform, artist impression.
- Type: ALCM
- Place of origin: Pakistan

Service history
- In service: 2012–Present
- Used by: Pakistan Air Force: Air Force Strategic Command

Production history
- Designer: National Engineering & Scientific Commission (Guidance/controls); Air Weapons Complex (Warhead design/assembly)
- Designed: 1998–2007
- Manufacturer: Air Weapons Complex
- Variants: Ra'ad II

Specifications (Technical data)
- Mass: 1,100 kg (2,400 lb)
- Length: 4.85 m (15.9 ft)
- Diameter: 0.50 m (20 in)
- Maximum firing range: 550 km (340 mi)
- Warhead: ICM/HE/NE
- Warhead weight: 450 kg (990 lb)
- Blast yield: 5 kilotons of TNT (21 TJ)—12 kilotons of TNT (50 TJ)
- Engine: Turbojet
- Payload capacity: 450 kg (990 lb)
- Operational range: 350 km (220 mi)–550 km (340 mi)
- Flight altitude: Terrain-following
- Maximum speed: ≤0.8 Mach. (980 km/h (610 mph))
- Guidance system: Inertial, Terminal
- Accuracy: 3.0 m (9.8 ft) CEP
- Launch platform: F-16AM/BM, Mirage-IIIR
- Transport: Combat aircraft

Ra'ad (Urdu: رعد, lit. 'Thunder'), military designation Hatf-VIII Ra'ad ('Target-8 Thunder'), is a Pakistani subsonic, standoff air-launched cruise missile (ALCM) jointly designed and developed by the National Engineering & Scientific Commission (NESCOM) and Air Weapons Complex.

It is deployed in the military service of Pakistan Air Force as Hatf-VIII, and has provided Pakistan with aerial nuclear deterrence.

== Development ==
Design and development of the Ra'ad began in 1998 with the program being delegated to National Engineering & Scientific Commission (NESCOM) that worked with Pakistan Air Force's engineering laboratory—Air Weapons Complex.

Not much has been known about the development of the program since it was designed and engineered in secrecy with military leading the program. Pakistan's engineering feat on designing the cruise missiles attracted the Western sources leveled allegations on China on collaboration and later placing blame on apartheid South Africa, which was strongly refuted former program manager General Mirza Aslam Beg, crediting to scientists for achieving this feat.

== Technical design ==
Codenamed as Ra'ad (lit. Thunder), the design engineering and its control system is developed by the NESCOM while weapon guidance, warhead design, and engine design was undertaken by the Pakistan Air Force's Air Weapons Complex. The Ra'ad features uses principles of stealth to avoid enemy detection, and is verified to carry tactical NE warheads at 350 km (220 mi). According to Pakistani military, the Ra'ad flies with subsonic speed at low altitude and follows terrain with high maneuverability.

In Pakistani military deployment, the Ra'ad has a unique military identification as Hatf-VIII (lit. Target-8) with mission for precision attacks on high value targets including command centers, radars, surface-to-air missile launchers, ballistic missile launchers and stationary warships. The second derivative of the Ra'ad is deployed as Ra'ad-II, which has an extended range of 600 km (370 mi).

The Ra'ad can carry 450 kg (990 lb) ammunition load with estimated blast yield of 5 kilotons of TNT (21 TJ)—12 kilotons of TNT (50 TJ).

== Operational history ==
=== Data acquisition and validation ===
On 25 August 2007, the Inter-Services Public Relations (ISPR) announced the first test of the Ra'ad. On 8 May 2008, a second test for validation was conducted when a military footage showed the Ra'ad being launched from the Pakistan Air Force's Mirage-IIIR. A third test was carried out on 29 April 2011, also from a Mirage-IIIR platform. The fourth test was carried out on 30 May 2012; a fifth test of the missile was carried out on 2 February 2015. A seventh test was carried out on 19 January 2016.

The Pakistan Air Force chose the Mirage-IIIR as its platform as opposed to F-16A/B to avoid American objections despite it being widely understood that PAF's F-16A/B are also capable Ra'ad launch platforms. Though initial tests have been conducted from a PAF's Mirage IIIR, there is potential to integrate this missile with other platforms such as the JF-17.

With the development and deployment of the Hatf-VIII Ra'ad, it has provided Pakistan with aerial nuclear deterrence to penetrate Indian Air Force defenses and its air force disparity.

== Raad II ==
A Ra'ad-II version of the missile was revealed on Pakistan parade day in 2017, with increased range of 600 km.

== See also ==
Related developments

- Babur (cruise missile)

Similar missiles

- AGM-158 JASSM – American low observable air-launched cruise missile
- KALCM Cheonryong – South Korean air-launched cruise missile
- TAURUS KEPD 350 – German/Swedish air-launched cruise missile
- SOM (missile) – Turkish air-launched cruise missile
- Storm Shadow – Franco-British cruise missile

Related lists

- List of missiles
- List of missiles by country
