= Babur (cruise missile) =

Pakistani land- & sea-launched cruise missile

Babur Missile
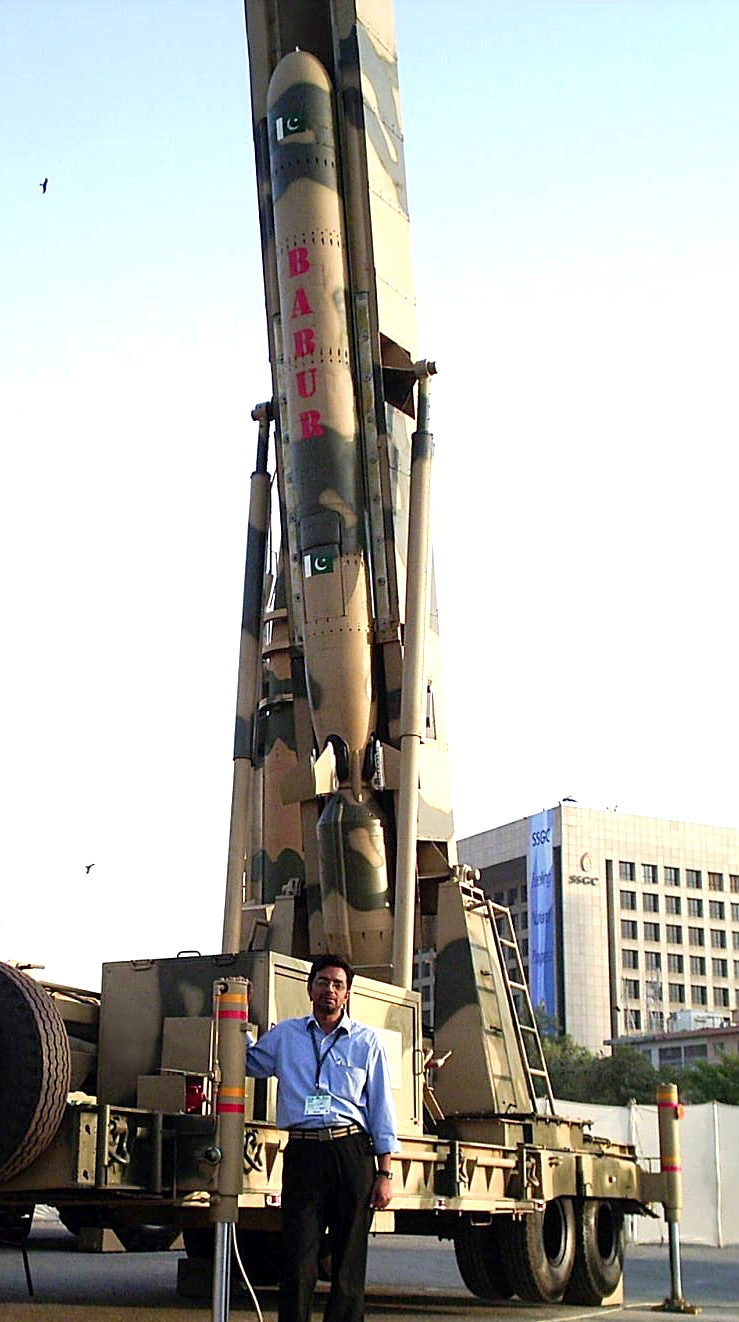
- Babur on display at IDEAS 2006
- Type: GLCM/SLCM/AshM

Service history
- In service: 2010–Present
- Used by: Pakistan Army (Army Strategic Forces); Pakistan Navy (Navy Strategic Forces)

Production history
- Designer: National Defence Complex
- Designed: 1998–2008 (GLCM); 2001–2018 (SLCM)
- Manufacturer: National Defence Complex
- Developed from: BGM-109 Tomahawk
- Variants: See variants

Specifications (Technical data)
- Mass: 1,500 kg (3,300 lb)
- Length: 6.2 m (20 ft)
- Diameter: 0.52 m (20 in)
- Wingspan: 2.50 m (8.2 ft)
- Maximum firing range: 900 km (560 mi)
- Warhead: HE/NE
- Warhead weight: 450 kg (990 lb) – 500 kg (1,100 lb)
- Blast yield: 5 kilotons of TNT (21 TJ) – 12 kilotons of TNT (50 TJ)
- Engine: Turbojet
- Transmission: Automatic
- Suspension: WS2500 10WD
- Propellant: Liquid-propellant (jet engine); Solid-propellant (booster)
- Operational range: Babur-I: 700 km (430 mi); Babur-IA: 450 km Babur-II: 750 km (470 mi); Babur-III: 450 km (280 mi; 240 nmi); Harbah: 700 km (430 mi; 380 nmi); Babur-IB: 900 km (560 mi); Harbah export variant: 290 km (180 mi; 160 nmi)
- Flight altitude: Terrain-following
- Maximum speed: 0.7 Mach. (subsonic); 990 km/h (620 mph)
- Guidance system: INS, TERCOM/DSMAC, GPS, GLONASS, Terminal,
- Accuracy: 20 m (66 ft) CEP
- Launch platform: Transporter erector launcher Cruise-missile submarine
- Transport: TEL, Horizontal launch tube (HLT)

The Babur (Urdu: بابر; Military designated: Hatf-VII, Translit: Target–7) is an all-weather, subsonic cruise missile developed by the National Defence Complex (NDC) based on reverse-engineered copies of U.S. BGM-109 Tomahawk missiles recovered by Pakistani intelligence after a 1998 U.S. strike in Afghanistan. Babur entered military service with the Pakistan Army in 2010; subsequent variants evolved into a submarine-launched missile, which saw its deployment with the Pakistan Navy in 2018.

According to the Pakistani military, a SLCM-variant of Babur has provided Pakistan a much desired and long-sought "credible sea-based second-strike capability, augmenting existing strategic deterrence."

== Development history ==
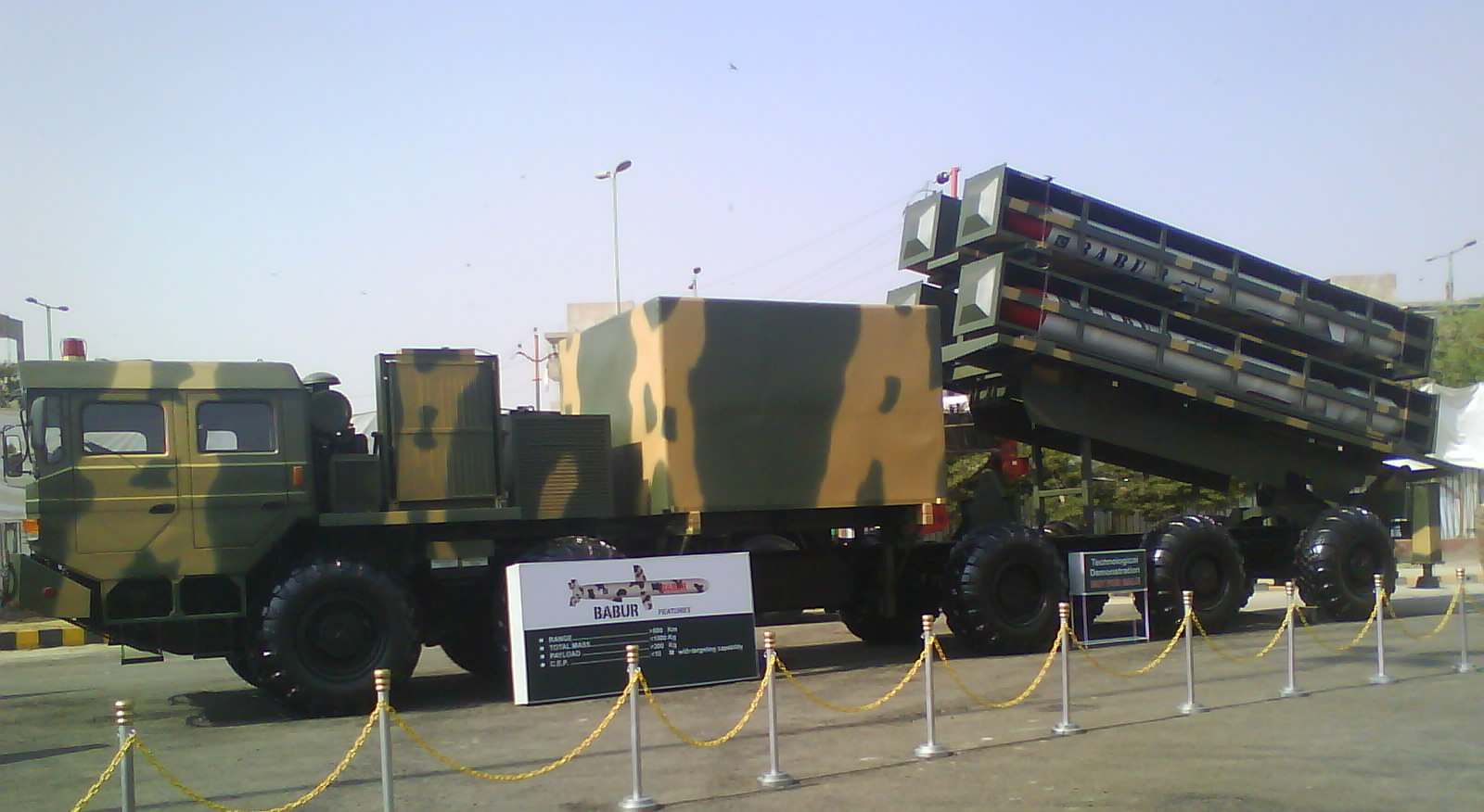
A Pakistan-engineered WS2500 TEL, displaying four cruise missiles at the IDEAS in 2008 in Karachi.

Development on Babur began in 1998. At that time, India was establishing a missile defense program that included the acquisition of the S-300 Grumble from Russia and Patriot PAC-3 systems from the United States.

The missile is codenamed after Babur, the first Mughal emperor.

These developments prompted Pakistani war strategists to pursue cruise missile technology that could evade and penetrate Indian defenses in the event of the Pakistani military losing ground against a hypothetical approaching Indian Army.

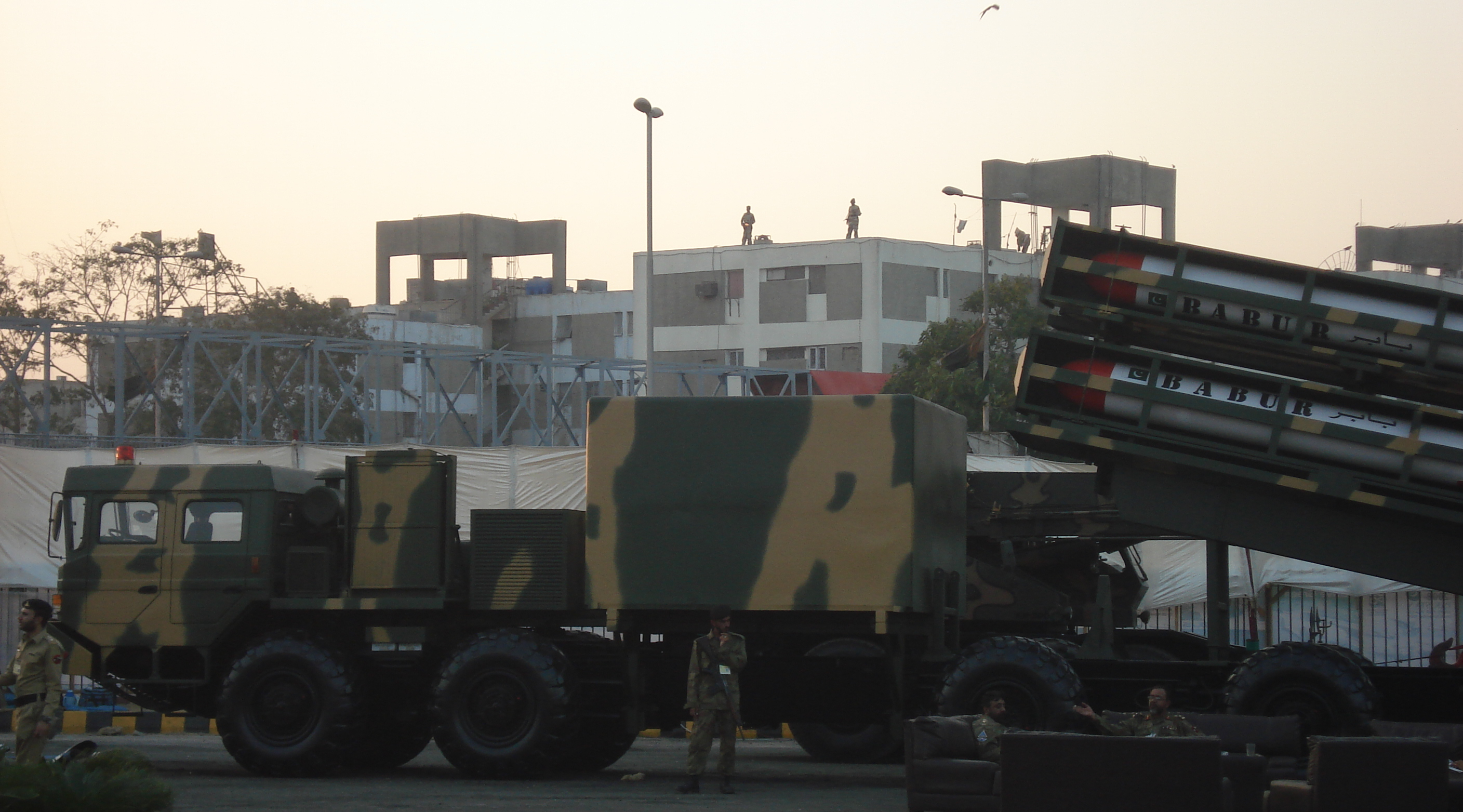
A TEL system displaying the ground-launched cruise missile in Karachi.

In 2005, Pakistan's test of Babur reportedly surprised the United States intelligence community. U.S.-based analysts leveled serious allegations against China of helping Pakistan, pointing out the similarities of the missile to the Chinese DH-10 and American BGM-109 Tomahawk. In 2012, former program manager Gen. Mirza Aslam Beg denied the U.S. allegations of Chinese help, crediting Pakistani scientists as having developed the technology. However in 2020, former Prime Minister Nawaz Sharif (who was Prime Minister in 1998) confessed that Pakistani scientists had in fact simply reverse-engineered the Tomahawk missile to make the Babur missile, when one fell as an unexploded ordnance in Pakistan's territory during the cruise missile attacks of Operation Infinite Reach in Afghanistan.

== Design ==
The Babur's airframe is made up of a tubular fuselage, with a pair of folded wings attached to the middle section and the empennage at the rear along with the propulsion system. Propelled by a jet engine (turbojet), the Babur has a maximum speed of approximately 550 mph. Launched from ground-based mobile transporter erector launchers (TELs), the Babur can be armed with both conventional and nuclear warheads and has a reported range of 750 km (470 mi). On launch, a booster provides additional thrust to accelerate the missile away from the launch vehicle. After the launch the wings unfold, the booster rocket is jettisoned and the jet engine started.

Babur's guidance system reportedly uses a combination of inertial navigation systems (INS), terrain contour matching (TERCOM) and GPS satellite guidance. Pakistan claims the missile has a high degree of maneuverability and can utilize it's TERCOM to help the missile avoid enemy radar detection by utilizing terrain masking, improving the chances of penetrating enemy air defence systems undetected. Future software and hardware updates could include the European Union's GALILEO and China's BeiDou Navigation Satellite System.

Pakistan has been converting and engineering its traditional Agosta-90B class submarines into cruise-missile submarines. However, enabling Babur being launched from a submarine was difficult for Pakistan because the Agosta-class submarines (both 70A and 90B) of Pakistan Navy do not have vertical launching system. Babur is designed to be cold launched horizontally through torpedo tubes in the absence of vertical launch systems. This enables the weapons to be kept in knockdown assembly form. Babur-III has a range of 450 km and can be used as a second-strike capability.

== Operational history ==
On 12 August 2005, Pakistan publicly announced that it had successfully test-fired a nuclear-capable cruise missile with a range of 500 km. The missile was launched from a land-based transporter erector launcher (TEL).

On 22 March 2007, Pakistan test-fired an upgraded version of the Babur with an extended range of 700 km.

On 6 May 2009, Pakistan conducted another test-firing but did not announce the event until 9 May 2009, citing political reasons.

On 28 October 2011, Pakistan successfully test-fired its Babur cruise missile which has a range of 700 km. A special feature of this launch was the validation of a new multi-tube missile launch vehicle (MLV) during the test. The three-tube MLV enhances manifold the targeting and deployment options in the conventional and nuclear modes.

On 6 June 2012, Pakistan conducted a successful test-fire of the Babur. A new variant of the missile, termed Babur-1B, was test fired on 14 April 2018.

On 14 December 2016, Pakistan conducted a successful launch of an enhanced version of the Babur II missile. Enhancements include upgraded aerodynamics and avionics where now the missile is able to accurately hit targets without the aid of GPS, and also target sea-based targets as well land based targets.

On 9 January 2017, Pakistan conducted a successful launch of the Babur III missile from an underwater mobile platform. On 29 March 2018, Pakistan reported that the missile had again been successfully tested.

On 11 February 2021, Pakistan conducted successful launch of Babur-1A cruise missile having upgraded avionics and navigation systems and capability to hit the ground based and sea based surface targets with the range of 450 km.

On 21 December 2021, Pakistan conducted a successful test of an enhanced range version of the Babur-1B that had a range of more than 900 km.

== Variants ==
=== Babur-I ===
Initial variant developed with the range of 700 km.

- Babur-IA: Enhanced avionics and navigation systems with a range of 450 km.
- Babur-IB: Enhanced range variant which can hit targets more than 900 km.

=== Babur-II ===
The second variant of the Babur missile series, it boasts an enhanced range of 750 and was developed to hit ground and naval targets without using a GPS.

=== Babur-III ===
Submarine launched nuclear variant with a range of 450 km. On 9 January 2017, Pakistan conducted a successful launch of the Babur-III missile from an underwater mobile platform, with a targeted range of 450 km (280 mi); Babur-III can carry nuclear warheads and serves as Pakistan's second-strike capability for the sea-based deterrence of the nuclear triad. On 29 March 2018, Pakistan Navy conducted another successful test for validation and assurances.

- Harbah: During the same time, the Pakistan Navy revealed the Harbah, which is an anti-ship missile non-nuclear version of Babur. The ISPR, media wing of the Pakistan Armed Forces, reported that the missile was test fired on 3 January 2018 from PNS Himmat, an Azmat-class missile boat.

== See also ==
Related developments

- Ra'ad (air-launched cruise missile)

Similar missiles

- Tomahawk – (United States)
- CJ-10 (missile) – (China)
- Hyunmoo-3 – (South Korea)
- NASM-MR – (India)
- Nirbhay – (India)

Related lists

- List of missiles
- List of missiles by country
