= Harbah (cruise missile) =

Ground-launched and ship-launched anti-ship cruise missile

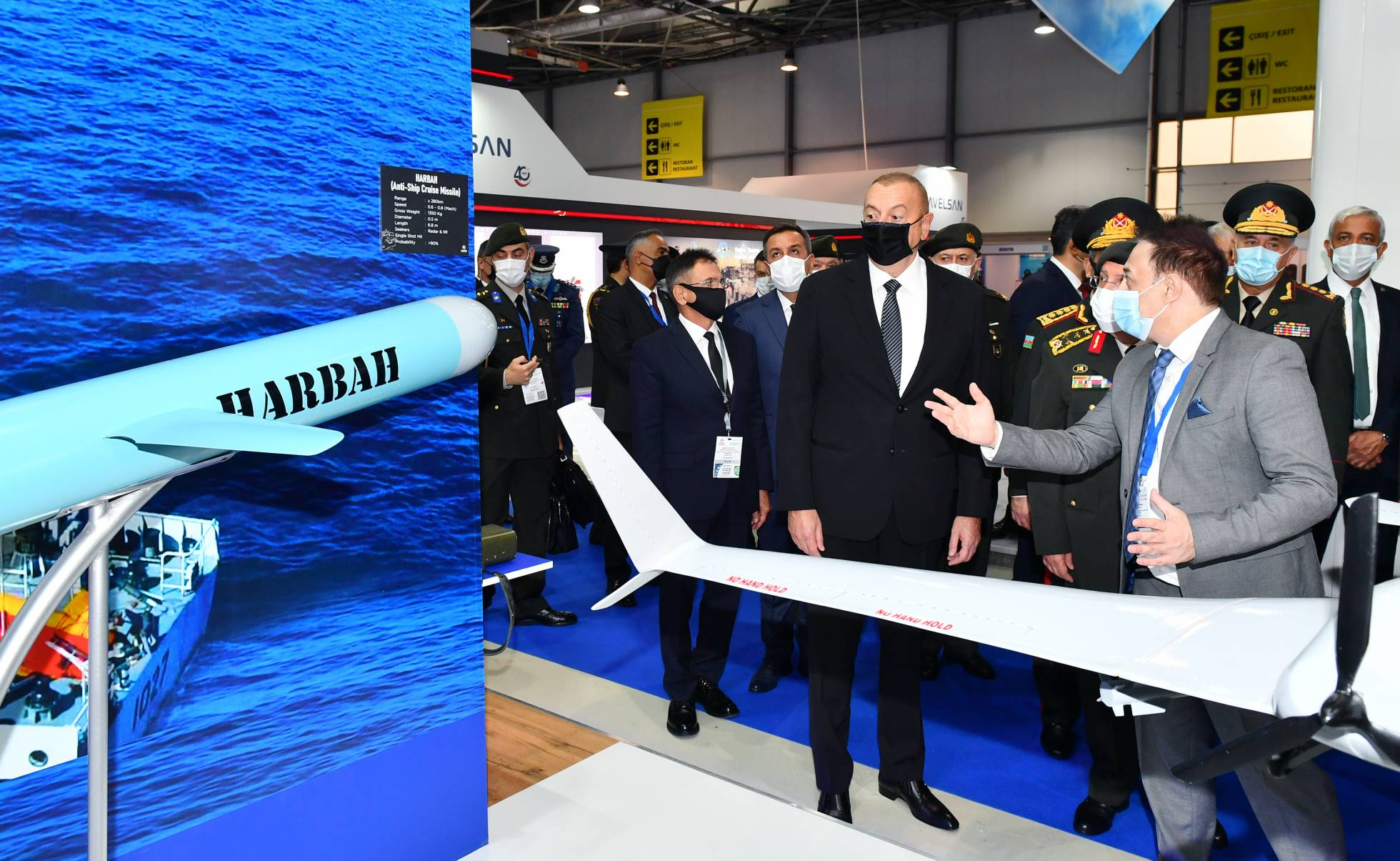
- Type: Cruise missile Surface-to-surface missile
- Place of origin: Pakistan

Service history
- In service: Since 2018
- Used by: Pakistan Navy

Production history
- Designer: National Development Complex; Maritime Technologies Complex
- Manufacturer: GIDS
- Developed from: Hatf-VII
- Variants: Harbah; Harbah-NG

Specifications
- Mass: 1,350 kg (2,980 lb)
- Length: 6.8 m (22 ft)
- Diameter: 0.5 m (1.6 ft)
- Warhead: Fragmentation or armour-piercing warhead
- Propellant: JP-8 Liquid fuel
- Operational range: 280 km (170 mi)
- Flight altitude: Sea skimming
- Maximum speed: Mach 0.6-0.8
- Guidance system: GLONASS; DSMAC camera Infrared homing INS; Radar homing SatNav
- Accuracy: >=10 m CEP
- Launch platform: Warships; Land-based TEL

The Harbah (Urdu: حَرْبَہ, lit. 'Weapon'), is a Pakistani medium-ranged all-weather turbojet powered anti-ship subsonic cruise missile that can be launched from ships, submarines & Transporter erector launchers. It is developed by Global Industrial Defence Solutions at NDC facility.

== Development history ==
The Harbah is reportedly a version of the Babur-III ship/submarine-based cruise missile. Initially, the Babur family of land attack missiles were entirely ground-launched. That changed in 2017 when the Babur-III version was fired from an underwater submarine. Therefore, it is possible that Harbah uses a truncated/smaller airframe making it possible for submarine tubes and ship-based launch canisters to carry the missile. It was later revealed that the Harbah was developed to address the requirements of the Pakistan Navy for a cost-effective and indigenous anti-ship & land attack missile. During the development, engineers had to reportedly limit its range owing to Pakistan's commitment to MTCR policies.

The Harbah was first test-fired in 2018 from PNS Himmat during which it successfully struck a decommissioned ship target. It was first showcased to the international market in 2022 at Doha during the DIMDEX exhibition.

=== Design ===
The Harbah is similar in design to the Babur family of cruise missiles. Its modular design allows it to be fitted with a wide array of warheads, guidance systems and extended range capabilities.

In case of the Harbah-NG variant, its guidance suite consists of a combined navigation system of GPS/GNSS and INS coupled with a Digital Scene Matching Area Correlator (DSMAC) camera. Moreover, it uses a terminal-stage seeker for anti-ship applications, which can optionally be an infrared seeker or Active radar homing system.

== Variants ==
- Harbah: Base model.
- Harbah-NG: Export-oriented version with improved sub-systems and extended range.

== Operators ==
=== Current ===
- Pakistan
  - Pakistan Navy
    - Azmat-class fast attack craft

=== Potential ===
- Qatar: In talks with GIDS to locally produce the missile.

== See also ==
- CX-1 Missile Systems – (China)
- Future Cruise/Anti-Ship Weapon – (France, Italy, United Kingdom)
- YJ-12 – (China)
- Boeing X-51 Waverider – (United States)
- RATTLRS – (United States)
- ASM-3 – (Japan)
- Yun Feng – (Taiwan)
- NASM-MR – (India)

== External media ==
- Harbah-NG Anti-Ship Cruise Missile
