= Maritime Technologies Complex =

Weapons development complex for Pakistan Navy

- Founded: 2001; 25 years ago
- Country: Pakistan
- Branch: Pakistan Navy
- Type: Research and development
- Role: Military science and technology
- Part of: Joint Strategic Planning, JS HQ
- Garrison/HQ: Islamabad, Pakistan
- Nickname: MTC

Commanders
- Director-General: R-Admn. Kamran Ahmed

The Maritime Technologies Complex (reporting name: MTC) is a corporate research and development complex for the Pakistan Navy. The complex was established in 2000 by the Pakistan Navy. It is located in Islamabad and has a research institute based in Karachi, Sindh.

The Maritime Technologies Complex is a naval weapons development complex where the programmatic guidance is directed by the navy, but the complex is managed and operated as a division under the civilian contract of National Engineering & Scientific Commission (NESCOM).

== Overview ==
The Maritime Technologies Complex (MTC) is a research and development complex for the Pakistan Navy but it managed and operated under the civilian contract awarded to the National Engineering & Scientific Commission (NESCOM). In early 2002, the Maritime Technologies Complex collaborated army's National Defence Complex (NDC) working on the explosives engineering technologies and assisted in developing the sophisticated naval mines and other area denial measures.

The complex also worked with private defense contractors in designing and developing the advanced towed array sonar to identify and capture the acoustic or radar signatures of the enemy submarines in the Indian Ocean.

The MTC closely worked with China State Shipbuilding Corporation in designing the Azmat-class fast attack craft for Pakistan Navy's specifications and standards. The MTC also worked with Turkey in designing the Babur-class warships for Pakistan Navy's specifications and standards. In 2020, it was reported that the complex had been working on rocket engine development for navy's missile program.

In 2016, the MTC was listed as export-controlled sanction by the U.S. government for its alleged involvement in Pakistan's missile program.
