= M113A2 Firefighting Vehicle =

The M113A2 Firefighting Vehicle was a US Army prototype of a M113 armoured personnel carrier (APC) modified to carry a system for dispensing fire suppressant liquid to combat petrochemical fires encountered on the battlefield. Only one vehicle was built and the system did not go into production.

== Overview ==
Following the 1990-1991 Gulf War where the coalition forces experienced difficulties travelling through Kuwaiti oil fields after the retreating Iraqi army set fire to the well heads, the US Army Material Command (AMC) and Tank Automotive Command (TACOM) initiated a project to produce and evaluate an armoured vehicle specifically designed to combat large hydrocarbon and petrochemical fires typically encountered on the battlefield.

The M113A2, a modernised version of the ubiquitous M113 APC which has been in service with US military forces since the early 1960s, was chosen as a platform for the project, as its expansive interior was considered ideal for mounting a self-contained firefighting system, and its armour would provide the crew with protection not only from fires but also from enemy weapons fire.

The vehicle was not expected to put the whole fire out; instead, its purpose was to create a temporary "fire lane" through which other vehicles and troops could pass. Instead of just water, the system would employ fire suppressant liquid which would temporarily prevent the burning petroleum products from re-igniting; five to six minutes was considered optimal "burnback" time.

== Design ==
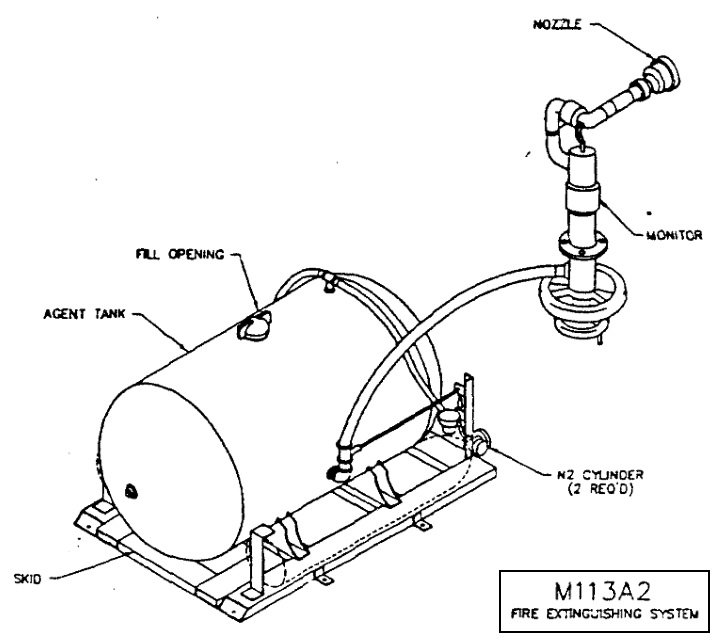
Fire extinguishing system as fitted to M113A2 Firefighting Vehicle

An M113A2 was modified to carry an Amerex Corporation fire suppression system, mounted on a removal skid to be located in the vehicle's rear cargo space, which could be fitted or removed by a forklift after minimal modifications to the vehicle.

Welded to the skid was a tank which could hold 250 US gallons (946 litres) of mixed water/fire suppressant, to be delivered to an externally mounted deluge gun at between 200 and 240 psi. The tank was fitted with a 4" (101.6mm) cap on the top for easy refilling and a drainage valve was located on the bottom. The fire suppressant liquid was pressurised by two 220 cubic foot (6.23 m^{3}) nitrogen or compressed air cylinders operating at 2,000 psi, which would deliver the suppressant at 150 to 200 gallons per minute. Replacement of the propellant cylinders and refilling the water and fire-suppressant tank took 7 to 10 minutes. Fitting the skid in the cargo cabin necessitated the removal of the personnel heater system and the rear-facing seat on the commander's station. The skid was bolted to the vehicle's floor plate.

A single water monitor was located on the front of the vehicle's top deck near the commander's cupola in place of the antenna cover. The crew would operate the monitor from inside the vehicle by remote control, with closed-circuit television cameras (CCTV) fitted externally to the vehicle to aim the nozzle. Testing revealed the original controls were difficult to use and were replaced with a simple lever system that allowed 160 degrees of horizontal movement and -15 to +45 degrees of vertical movement.

The fire suppression system added 1,220 lb (550 kg)) empty weight to the vehicle, and around 3,300 lb (1,500 kg) with the 250 gallon tank full.

== Testing ==
Testing was carried out between 12 and 22 February 1992 at Tyndall Air Force Base, Florida, using personnel from the Fire Protection and Crash Rescue Research Branch of the US Air Force Engineering Service Centre (AFESC/RDCF).

To simulate a large hydrocarbon fire anticipated in combat operations a trench 96 feet by 10 feet with a 15 inch high berm was dug into clay and filled with water; 250-500 gallons of JP-4 aviation fuel was poured onto the water and set alight. It was originally calculated that with the 250 gallon tank the water monitor could suppress a fire lane 10 feet (3 m) wide and 100 feet long; however, testing revealed it could only create a lane up to 70–80 feet (21–24 m) long under ideal conditions, less if the fire suppressant liquid was delivered into the wind. Different suppressants were tested including Pryrocap B-136, Hurri-Safe, Powdered Viscous Foam (PVF), Aqueous Film Forming Foam (AFFF) foam (MIL-F-24835C), Phirex, and Acu-Lite-F; AFFF (6% mix) was found to be the most successful suppression agent. Sea water (trucked in specifically for the test) was used during testing as this was expected to be the typical water source in real-world applications.

Without the CCTV cameras in use, the monitor operator could only use the vehicle's standard vision periscopes, and in this scenario they were often unable to accurately direct the stream. An alternative procedure was for the operator to don a fire-resistant suit and operate the monitor manually through the vehicle's hatch; as this was found to be the most successful method of operating the monitor it was recommended that it would be adopted as standing operating procedure (SOP), even though it would result in increased risk to the exposed crew member.

Although the tests were deemed an overall success the system was not put into production; the modifications were removed from the test vehicle which was then returned to regular service.

== Similar Vehicles ==
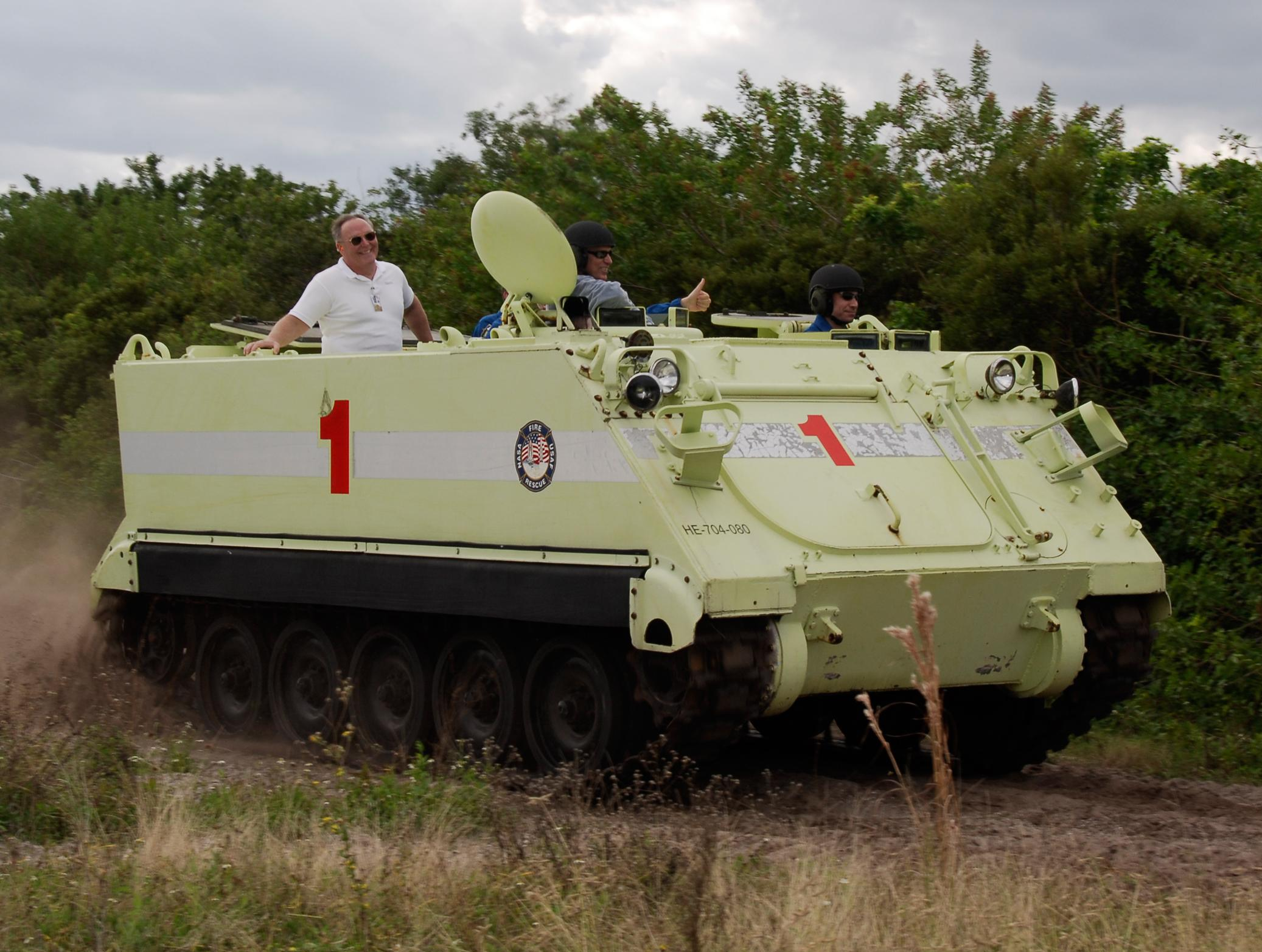
M113 Arnoured Rescue Vehicle used by the KSC Fire Department, Florida

M113s and variants such as the M548 are used by various fire departments and private companies around the world as firefighting vehicles, often employed to combat forest fires where terrain makes access for regular firefighting appliances difficult.

From the early 1960s through to 2013 NASA operated four (4) M113 Armoured Rescue Vehicles at the Kennedy Space Center; however, these vehicles only transported firefighters and emergency rescue personnel and were not equipped with any built-in fire fighting or suppression systems.

In 2017 MythBusters star Jamie Hyneman created the 'Sentry', a prototype firefighting vehicle from a surplus M548A1 Tracked Cargo Carrier, which can be either crewed or remotely operated.

The Danish army fitted out at least one M113 as a firefighting vehicle for use in training areas and shooting ranges. A 1,500 L (400 US gal) water tank with heater is mounted in the rear occupying most of the cargo area. A single water monitor is located on the top deck near the commander's cupola, with a pump driven either by a hydraulic or petrol engine. The vehicle is operated by a 2 man crew. As at January 2021, it is not known if this vehicle is still in service.
