= International Defence Exhibition and Seminar =

Pakistani defence exhibition

IDEAS International Defence Exhibition and Seminar
- Dates: November
- Frequency: Biennial: Even years
- Locations: Karachi Expo Centre, Karachi
- Country: Pakistan
- Established: 2000; 26 years ago
- Most recent: 2024
- Next event: 2026
- Attendance: 52,000 at the last occurrence
- Website: ideaspakistan.gov.pk

The International Defence Exhibition and Seminar, more commonly referred to as IDEAS, is a defence sector event, held biennially, in Pakistan. Since its inception by President Pervez Musharraf in 2000, it has grown to include more than 54,000 trade visitors, 290 delegates members (from 43 countries), 133 national exhibitors and 294 exhibitors from around the world as of IDEAS 2016.

The Pakistan government attaches a high level of importance to IDEAS; despite the fact that it attracts a large number of delegates, it is seen as a vehicle for facilitating their own indigenous arms trade. The level of political involvement has been known to reach the highest echelons, with President Asif Ali Zardari personally inviting the Amir of Kuwait Sheikh Sabah Al-Ahmad Al-Jaber Al-Sabah to the event in 2008 in order to boost the chances of Pakistan's export of its indigenously developed Al-Khalid main battle tanks.

The Defence Export Promotion Organisation, or simply DEPO, is the government agency responsible for the success and organization of IDEAS. Typically, they outsource some elements of the exhibition production to private companies. From 2000 to 2006, Pegasus Consultancy Private Limited organized the event. However, after the 2010 conference was canceled due to catastrophic floods that hit Pakistan late that year, the contract for the event production was awarded to Badar Expo Solutions. Assessing the event's growth since its inaugural occurrence in 2000, Prime Minister Yousaf Raza Gillani declared at the 'soft launch' for IDEAS 2012 that the exhibition had become a "mega event" in just eleven years and had achieved global recognition. IDEAS is held biennially at the Karachi Expo Center with participation from around the world.

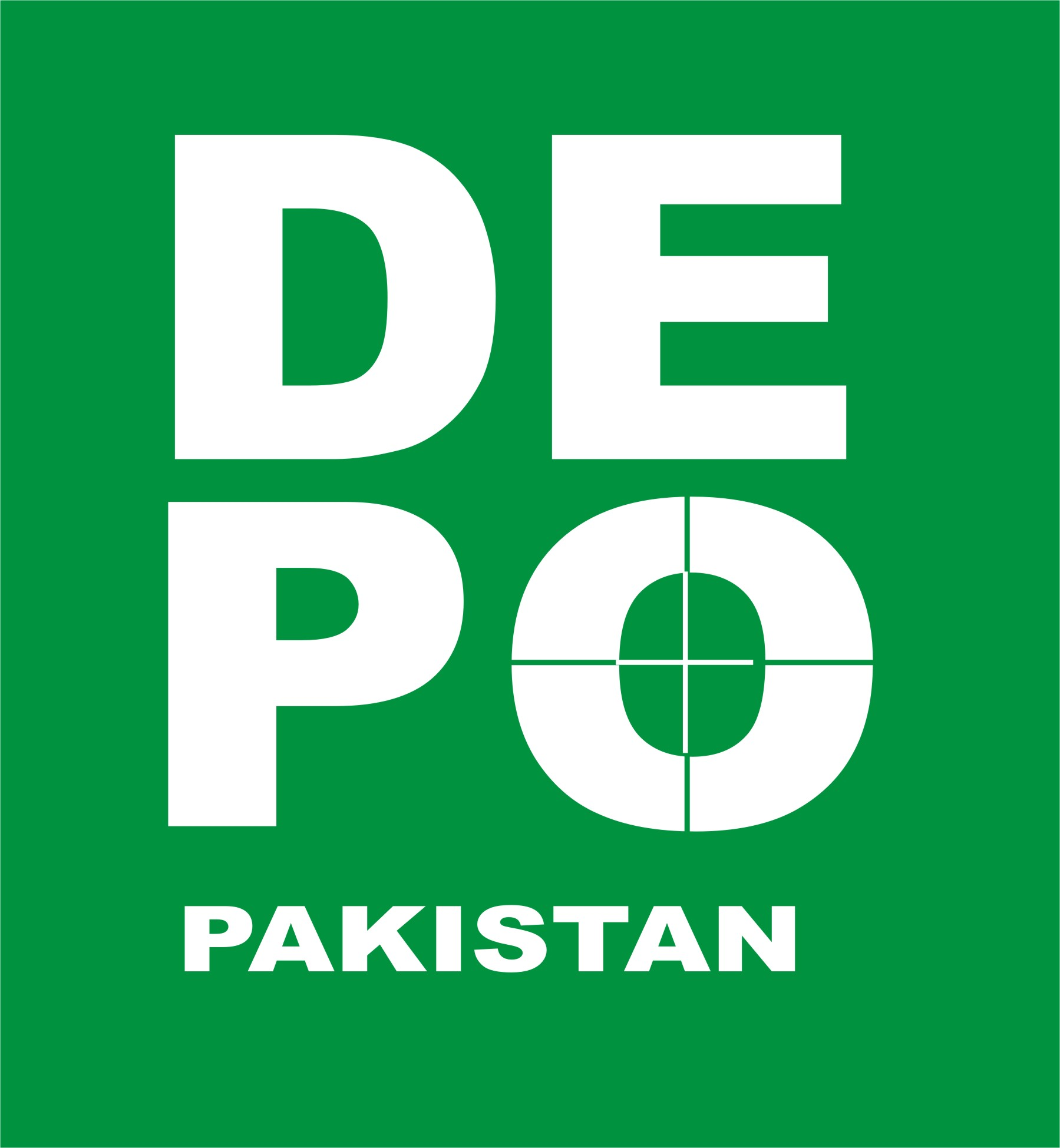

== History of the event ==
=== IDEAS 2000 ===
The brainchild of the then Chief Executive of Pakistan, Pervez Musharraf, the first ever Tri-Service Defence Exhibition and the largest International Event of its kind in Pakistan, ‘IDEAS 2000’ was held at the EXPO Centre in Karachi in November 2000.

Mr. Mohammad Rafiq Tarar, President of Islamic Republic of Pakistan, attended the event as Chief Guest. Service Chiefs of Pakistan Navy and Airforce were also present at the event.

There are delegates from 35 countries, with a combined procurement budget of over US$20 billion.

=== IDEAS 2002 ===
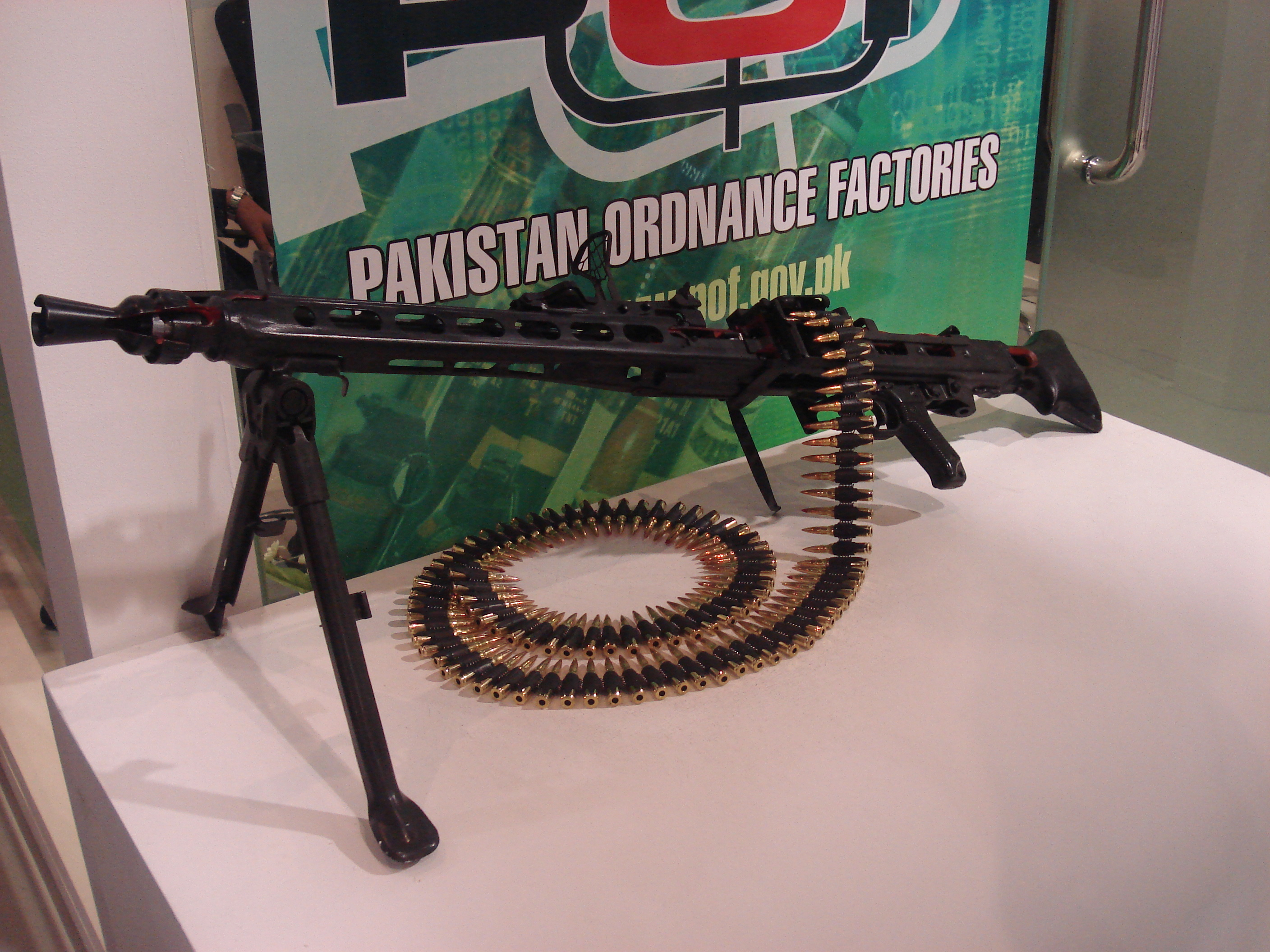
The Rheinmetall MG 3 machine gun, produced under license by Pakistan Ordnance Factories (POF), on display at IDEAS

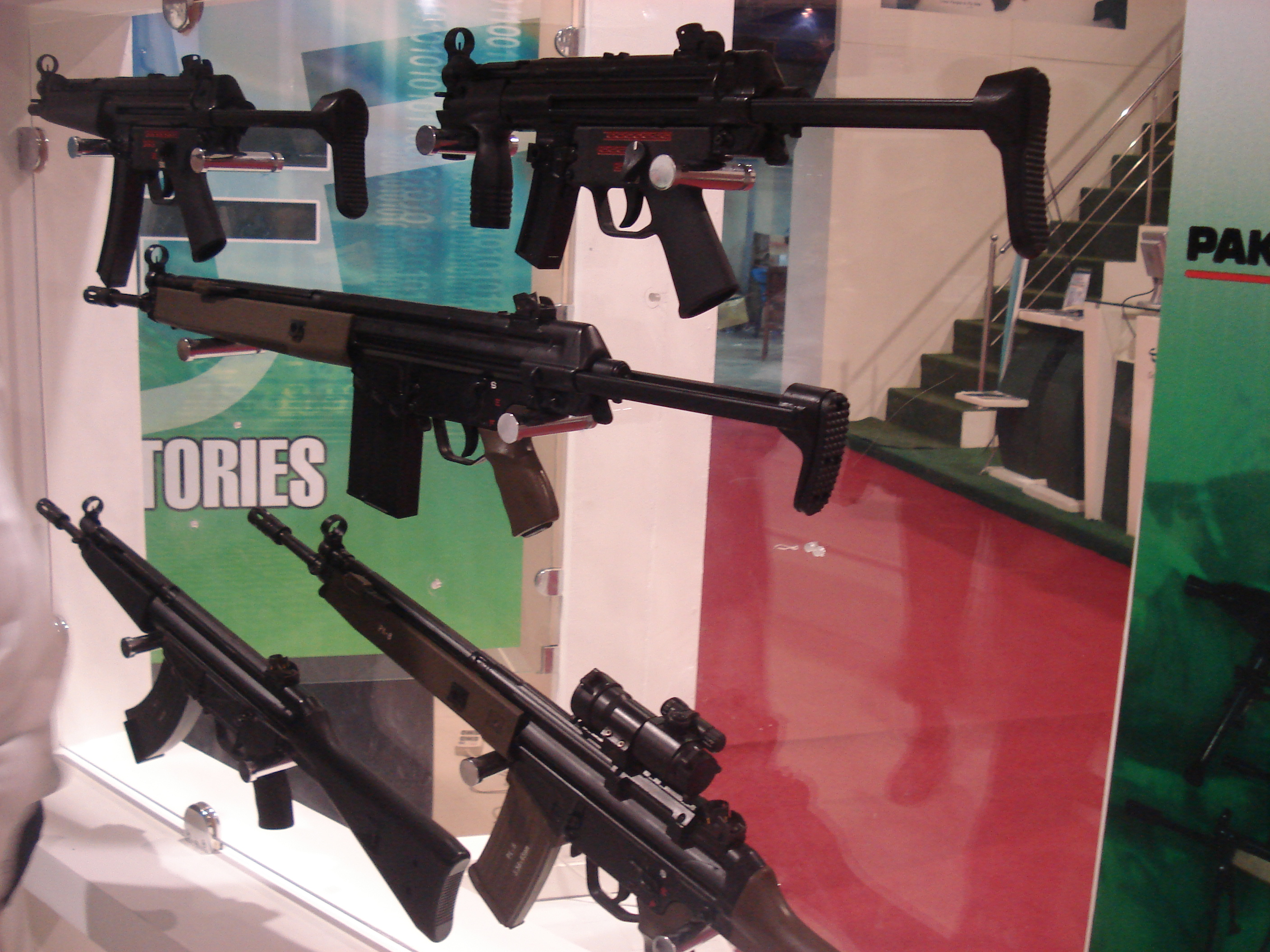
Several HK MP5 and HK G3 variants produced by POF on display at IDEAS

Occurring on 16–19 September 2002 at the Karachi Expo Centre, the seminar element of the conference had expanded by this point to include, over two days, the following themes: "Asian Security Scenario" and "The Asian Defence Market". The principal officer in charge of the event was Major General Syed Ali Hamed, then Director General of DEPO, who expected to receive 1500 attendees. The event was launched again by President Pervez Musharraf.

In its second year the event had attracted wide international interest with General Hamid reporting to Dawn newspaper that exhibitors from China, Turkey, France, Russia, Italy, Romania, Ukraine, United Kingdom, USA, UAE and Saudi Arabia were expected to attend.

By 2002, IDEAS was being touted as the largest commercial event in the history of Pakistan with 45 official delegations from 30 countries attending and 110 exhibition stands from 25 countries.

In his speech, President Musharraf said the seminar would go a long way in shortening the technological gap between developed and developing countries especially with regards to defence production and preparedness, he welcomed the international delegates: "Their presence positively reflect[ing] the standing that Pakistan holds in the world as well as the excellent relations that it enjoys with a host of nations."

=== IDEAS 2004 ===
There was full representation from the Pakistan Armed Forces with all of the Service Chiefs in attendance, and even though India had attempted to curtail US sales to Pakistan, there was a sizeable presence from American companies including from Lockheed Martin and Raytheon.

=== IDEAS 2006 ===
By 2006 IDEAS was an established biannual international defence expo, it used the tag line (still in use today) of "Arms for Peace" and had matured to announce defence contracts as a major feature of the programme. 226 companies attended the exhibition of which 148 were non-Pakistani.

The first contract to be announced was the co-production of arms and ammunition with Germany and the Republic of Korea and was disclosed by the Chairman of Pakistan Ordnance Factories (POF) Lt General Syed Sabahat Hussain."

Aside from this, Dr Samar Mubarakmand from Pakistan's National Engineering and Scientific Commission (NESCOM) also announced MoUs with undisclosed African and Muslim states of $50 million, adding to NESCOM's existing export deals worth $500 million over the last three years with no transfer of technology necessary.

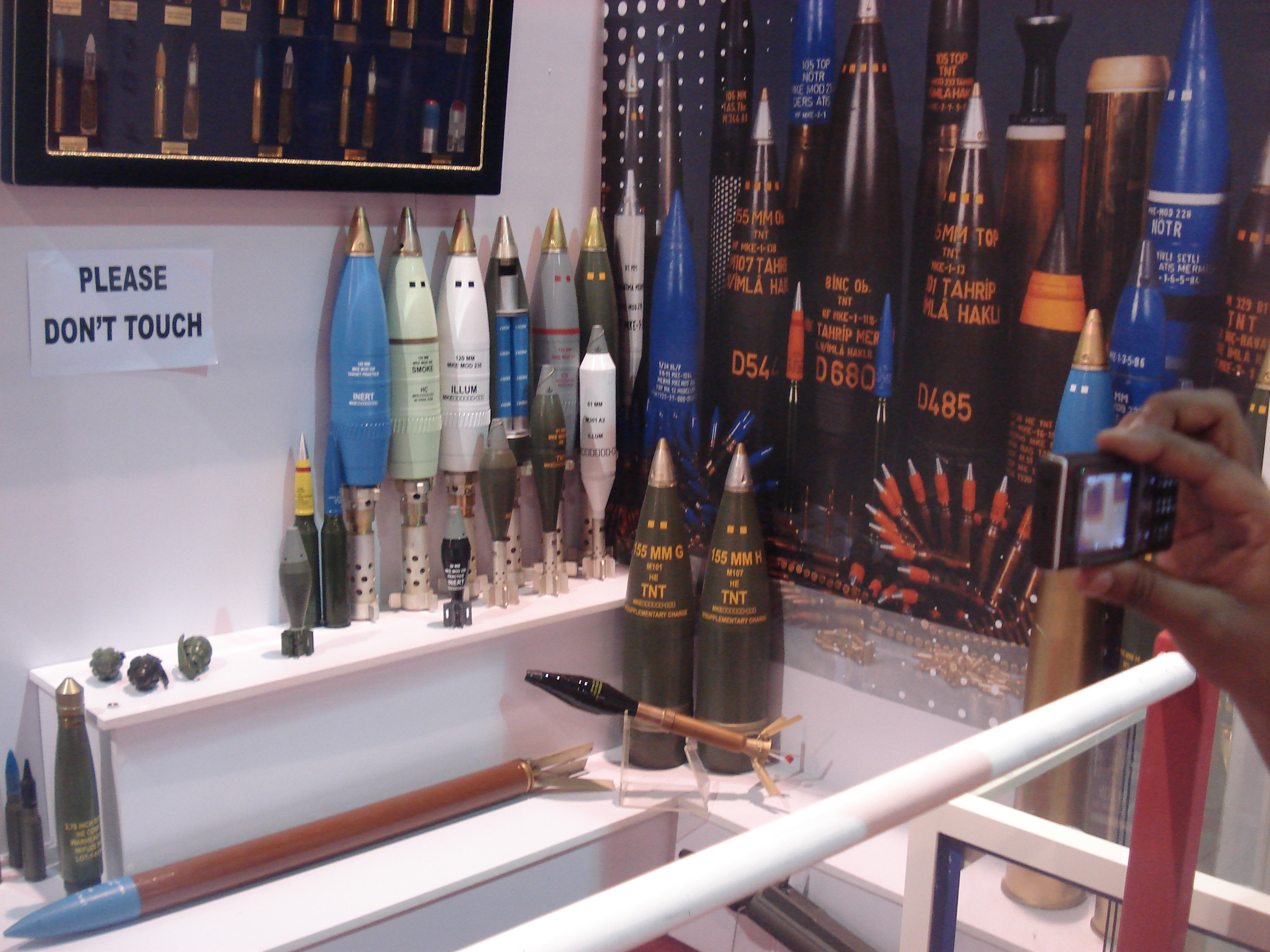
A variety of grenades, artillery shells, mortar shells and other ammunition produced by Pakistan Ordnance Factories, on display at IDEAS

According to the Pakistani News Service an "extensive media coverage was made with over 2,200 articles, editorials and news items published worldwide in leading newspapers and industry magazines."

=== IDEAS 2008 ===
Gaining momentum from the previous exhibition in 2006, General Farooq also reported three months prior to the exhibition to be held at the Karachi Expo Centre on 24–28 November that 92% of exhibition space had already been sold. And unlike the previous four exhibitions, which offered free entry to the expo element of the event, a fee would be levied of $25 per person.

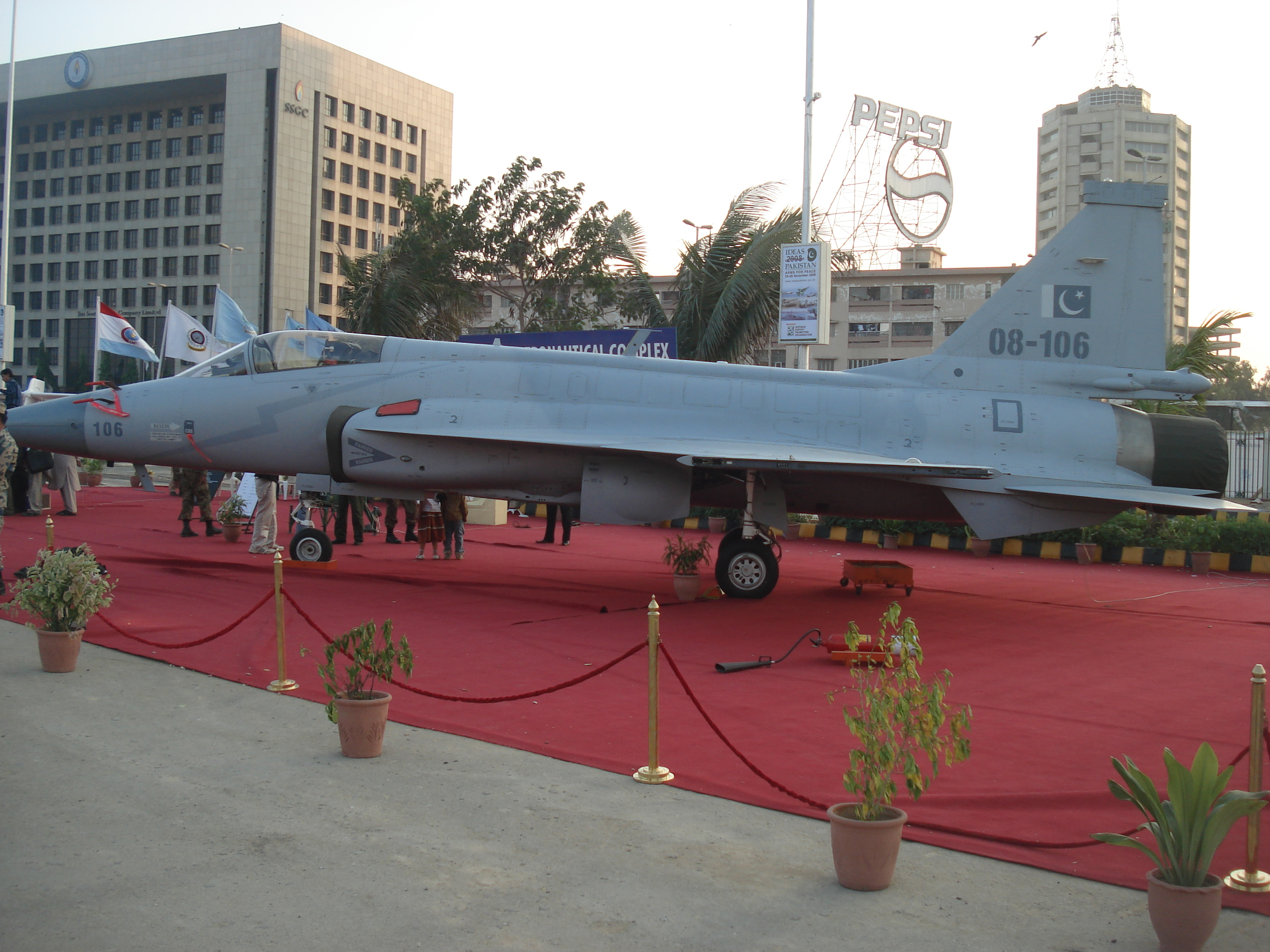
JF-17 Thunder Aircraft at IDEAS 2008

The Prime Minister's address was centred on terrorism and extremism, its negative effects on the perception of Pakistan and the motives of terrorists to destabilise Pakistan's economy. He concluded that IDEAS, with its great many exhibitors, was proof that the terrorists were not having the diverse effect they would hope for. Other notable attendees included: Sindh Governor Dr Ishratul Ebad Khan, Chief Minister Syed Qaim Ali Shah, Chief of Army Staff General Ashfaq Parvez Kayani and the State Minister for Defence Abdul Qayoom Khan Jatoi.

=== IDEAS 2010 ===
On 15 October 2010, the Director General of DEPO issued a statement cancelling IDEAS, citing "devastating floods that effected 22 million people and resulted in loss of valuable lives and property" as the reason.

Despite cancellation of the event exhibitors were guaranteed their deposit refunds and offered, should they wish to exhibit in 2012, the same rates as provided in 2010.

=== IDEAS 2012 ===
On 15 September 2011, 11 months after the previous IDEAS was cancelled due to force majeure The event, planned at the Karachi Expo Centre on 7–11 November, will see an enlarged seminar aspect focusing on tri-services military collateral, equipment and security services.

A 'soft-launch' for IDEAS 2012 was held at the Pakistan National Council of Arts in Islamabad on 30 March. Importantly, the event resumed IDEAS tradition of full government support with the proceedings inaugurated by Prime Minister Syed Yusuf Raza Gilani; Senior Minister for Defence Production and Industries Chaudhry Pervaiz Elahi; Federal Minister for Defence, Chaudhry Ahmad Mukhtar; Federal Minister for Information and Broadcasting, Dr. Firdous Ashiq Awan; Chairman of the Joint Chiefs of Staff Committee, General Khalid Shahmeem Wynne; the Chief of Army Staff, General Ashfaq Parvez Kayani; and the Chief of Air Staff, Air Chief Marshal Tahir Rafique Butt amongst many other ministers, diplomats and Industry representatives.

The DG DEPO, stated that the exhibition would be bigger in size than ever before and according to Associated Press of Pakistan, with still eight months until the event launches, 60 percent of the space allocated for IDEAS 2012 had been booked with Turkey, China, Germany and France booking larger spaces to display their defence equipment. Khan also predicted that over 2000 weapons systems would be on display that year.

Prime Minister Gilani underscored the exhibition's core tenet by stating that Pakistan would continue to "develop its military potential to guarantee peace with honor and dignity." According to The Nation, he highlighted that the country had significantly enhanced its indigenous capabilities for manufacturing sophisticated weapon systems and equipment. IDEAS 2012 marked a notable resurgence, with a total of 209 exhibitors participating, including 74 from Pakistan and 135 from the international community.

=== IDEAS 2014 ===
IDEAS 2014 was held in November, 2014.

=== IDEAS 2016 ===
IDEAS 2016 was held from 22 to 25 November 2016 and the event was organized by DEPO (Defence Export Promotion Organization) whereas it was inaugurated by Prime Minister of Pakistan Mian Muhammad Nawaz Sharif on DAY ONE and President of Pakistan Mamnoon Hussain attended the strategic seminar as Chief Guest held on evening of 1st day (22 November) at Moven Pick Hotel Karachi.

The event was heavily attended by local as well as international delegations from more than 43 countries. IDEAS 2016 witnessed 293 International Exhibitors, 133 National Exhibitors and 54,000 trade visitors. Under the command of DG DEPO Major General Agha Masood Akram, event was organized by various officers from all three services including Brig Waheed Mumtaz as Director Coordination, Brig Shahid as Director Foreign Delegation, Commodore Muhammad Tariq as Director Navy, Air Commodore Muhammad Tahir as Director Export Promotion Services, Colonel Fahim Imtiaz Abbassi as Colonel Coordination and Major Ejaz Ahmed Bhatti as GSO-2 IDEAS.

The event was conducted with full support of armed forces of Pakistan, Government of Sindh and under the overall umbrella of Ministry of Defence Production with Mr Rana Tanveer Hussain as Minister.

=== IDEAS 2018 ===
IDEAS 2018 was held in November, 2018.

=== IDEAS 2020 ===
IDEAS 2020 was scheduled to be held from 24 November to 29 November 2020, however, it was cancelled due to the COVID-19 pandemic.

=== IDEAS 2022 ===
IDEAS 2022 was held from November 15 to November 19, 2022, at the Karachi Expo Center. It featured 218 national exhibitors and 314 international exhibitors, covering a total area of 12,600 square meters (135,600 square feet). The exhibition spanned four days and attracted approximately 51,000 trade visitors.

=== IDEAS 2024 ===
IDEAS 2024 was held from 19 November to 22 November 2024 at Karachi Expo Center, Sindh.

Attendees came from 55 countries, including the United States, Russia, China, Turkey, Iran, Italy, the United Kingdom, and Azerbaijan to visit the four-day show, according to the Inter-Services Public Relations (ISPR).

The exhibition, organised biennially by the Defence Export Promotion Organization (DEPO) in Pakistan, continued from 19 November to 22 November 2024.

Pakistan showcased its domestically produced Haider Main Battle Tank (HMBT) and a new medium-altitude long-endurance GIDS Shahpar-II drone, as well as Al-Khalid and Al-Zarrar tanks and the PAC MFI-17 Mushshak trainer aircraft.
