= National Defence Complex =

Weapons research complex of the Pakistan Army

- Active: January 1993–Present
- Country: Pakistan
- Branch: Pakistan Army
- Type: Research and development
- Role: Military science and technology
- Part of: Joint Strategic Planning, JS HQ
- Garrison/HQ: Fateh Jang, Punjab
- Nickname: NDC
- Website: Senate on NDC; NTI on NDC

Commanders
- Director-General: Maj-Gen. Ejaz Mirza

The National Defence Complex (reporting name: NDC) is a foundational weapons research and development complex for the Pakistan Army, headquartered in Fateh Jang, Punjab.

Development guidance comes directly from the army's field evaluation but the complex is managed and operated as a division under the civilian contract of National Engineering & Scientific Commission (NESCOM). Its current director-general is Major-General Ejaz Mirza.

== History ==
The foundation of the National Defence Complex was a product of secret and decades-long endeavor to address the weapons delivery of nuclear discharges from the Pakistan Air Force's fighter jets. Initially in 1993, the NDC was established as a civilian weapons development complex to take over the physical production of the earliest nuclear warhead after the designs and engineering calculations were computed and concluded by the R Block and the Special Development Works (SDW).

The air force's Air Weapons Complex (AWC) led the guidance and the greatly assisted the NDC in understanding the aerodynamics and conducted several successful tests of designs with the AWC while the PAF practiced the toss bombing method between 1988 and 1995. In 1995, the NDC was mission was indefinitely moved towards the aerospace environment and it worked on the missile development when the Hatf Program (lit. Target) was initiated by Prime Minister Benazir Bhutto. The NDC was the prime contractor for leading the Shaheen missile program with Pakistan Army as its customer, and began its pioneering studies in rocket engine development for Shaheen, Ghaznavi, and Abdali secret projects. During this time, the DU ammunition were produced and revealed in 2001 at the International Defence Exhibition in UAE.

In 2001, the NDC was moved from the civilian leadership and military leadership as a means to centralizing the missile weapons program. Although, the National Engineering & Scientific Commission (NESCOM) is the civilian provider of management and technical services, the NDC is, however, led by the active-duty high ranking army officer. As of current, Major-General Ejaz Mirza, commissioned in the Regiment of Artillery, has been serving the Director-General of National Defence Complex.

== Research, development and production ==
=== Missiles ===
- Air-to-air missile research – It was reported in November 2001 that the Aerospace Division of NDC was doing "preliminary studies" for developing a new medium range air-to-air missile. According to the report no full scale hardware had yet been built but investigations by NDC engineers into various design approaches were ongoing. The report stated that suggested that the missile may use active radar homing.
- Babur
- Nasr
- Shaheen-I
- Shaheen-II

=== Depleted uranium ammunition ===
- 105 mm anti-tank round – a DU APFSDS anti-tank round developed to be fired by Type 59 tanks (upgraded with 105 mm guns) in service with the Pakistan Army. Reported to have a muzzle velocity of 1,450 m/s and be capable of penetrating 450 mm of rolled homogeneous armour (RHA) at an unspecified range.
- Naiza (125 mm anti-tank round) – a DU APFSDS anti-tank round developed to be fired by T-80UD tanks in service with the Pakistan Army. A model of the round was put on display at the IDEX 2001 exhibition in the United Arab Emirates and it was stated to have a DU long rod penetrator, performance 25% greater than NDC's 105 mm DU round and a saddle-type sabot with re-arranged forward bore-rider for more accurate alignment with the T-80UD's autoloader. Displayed at IDEAS 2002 alongside DU rounds produced by other Pakistani organisations. Reportedly named "Naiza", made compatible with the T-80UD tank and stated to be capable of penetrating 550 mm of RHA.

=== Other ===
- Starfish naval mine – a naval mine that targets submarines and ships, details on the mine were first released in 2001. Can be deployed by aircraft, ships and submarines. Makes use of solid state electronics. The mine's attack modes are controlled by a microprocessor which uses magnetic, acoustic and pressure sensors to analyse a potential target's signature. Sensors are mounted flush to both ends of the mine's cylindrical (barrel) shape. It is unknown if the mine has a self-destruct mechanism. Weight: 767 kg, warhead: 500 kg HE (PBX charge), storage life: 20 years.

== See also ==
- National Engineering and Scientific Commission
- United States Army Research Laboratory— United States Army facility with similar mission
