= Nuclear explosive =

Explosive device not necessarily for military use

A nuclear explosive is an explosive device that derives its energy from nuclear reactions. Almost all nuclear explosive devices that have been designed and produced are nuclear weapons intended for warfare.

Other, non-warfare, applications for nuclear explosives have occasionally been proposed. For example, nuclear pulse propulsion is a form of spacecraft propulsion that would use nuclear explosives to provide impulse to a spacecraft. A similar application is the proposal to use nuclear explosives for asteroid deflection. From 1958 to 1965 the United States government ran a project to design a nuclear explosive powered nuclear pulse rocket called Project Orion. Never built, this vessel would use repeated nuclear explosions to propel itself and was considered surprisingly practical. It is thought to be a feasible design for interstellar travel.

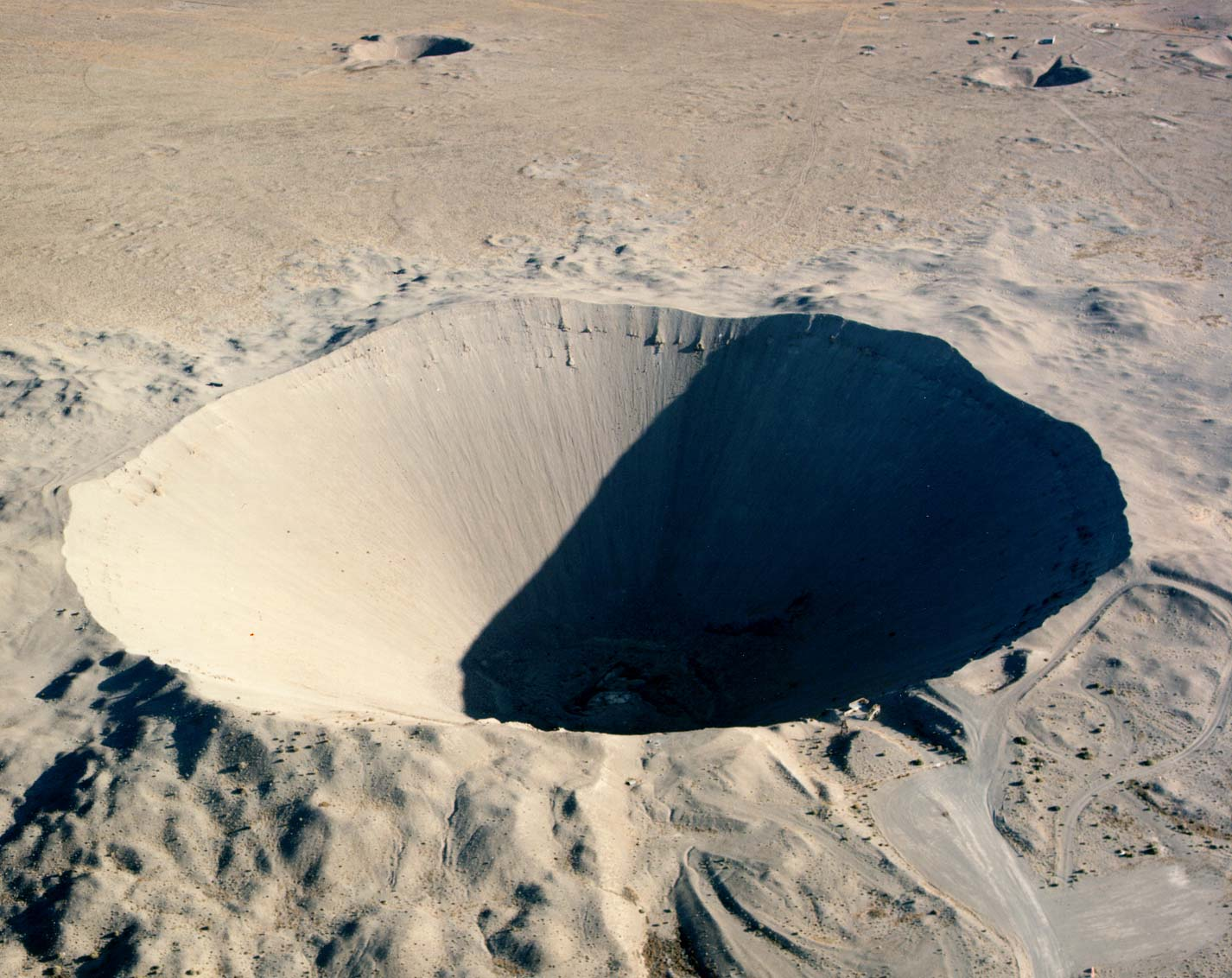
The 1962 Sedan nuclear test formed a crater 100 m (330 ft) deep with a diameter of about 390 m (1,300 ft), as a means of investigating the possibilities of using peaceful nuclear explosions for large-scale earth moving.

Nuclear explosives were once considered for use in large-scale excavation. A nuclear explosion could be used to create a harbor, or a mountain pass, or possibly large underground cavities for use as storage space. It was thought that detonating a nuclear explosive in oil-rich rock could make it possible to extract more from the deposit, e.g. note the Canadian Project Oilsand. From 1958 to 1973 the U.S. government exploded 28 nuclear test-shots in a project called Operation Plowshare. The purpose of the operation was to use peaceful nuclear explosions for moving and lifting enormous amounts of earth and rock during construction projects such as building reservoirs. The Soviet Union conducted a much more vigorous program of 122 nuclear tests, some with multiple devices, between 1965 and 1989 under the auspices of Program No. 7 – Nuclear Explosions for the National Economy.

As controlled nuclear fusion has proven difficult to use as an energy source, an alternate proposal for producing fusion power has been to detonate nuclear fusion explosives inside very large underground chambers and then using the heat produced, which would be absorbed by a molten salt coolant which would also absorb neutrons. The 1970s PACER (fusion) project investigated fusion detonation as a power source.

Failure to meet objectives, along with the realization of the dangers of nuclear fallout and other residual radioactivity, and with the enactment of various agreements such as the Partial Test Ban Treaty and the Outer Space Treaty, has led to the termination of most of these programs.
