= Terminal guidance =

Guidance system in missiles

In the field of weaponry, terminal guidance refers to any guidance system that is primarily or solely active during the "terminal phase", just before the weapon impacts its target. The term is generally used in reference to missile guidance systems, and specifically to missiles that use more than one guidance system through the missile's flight.

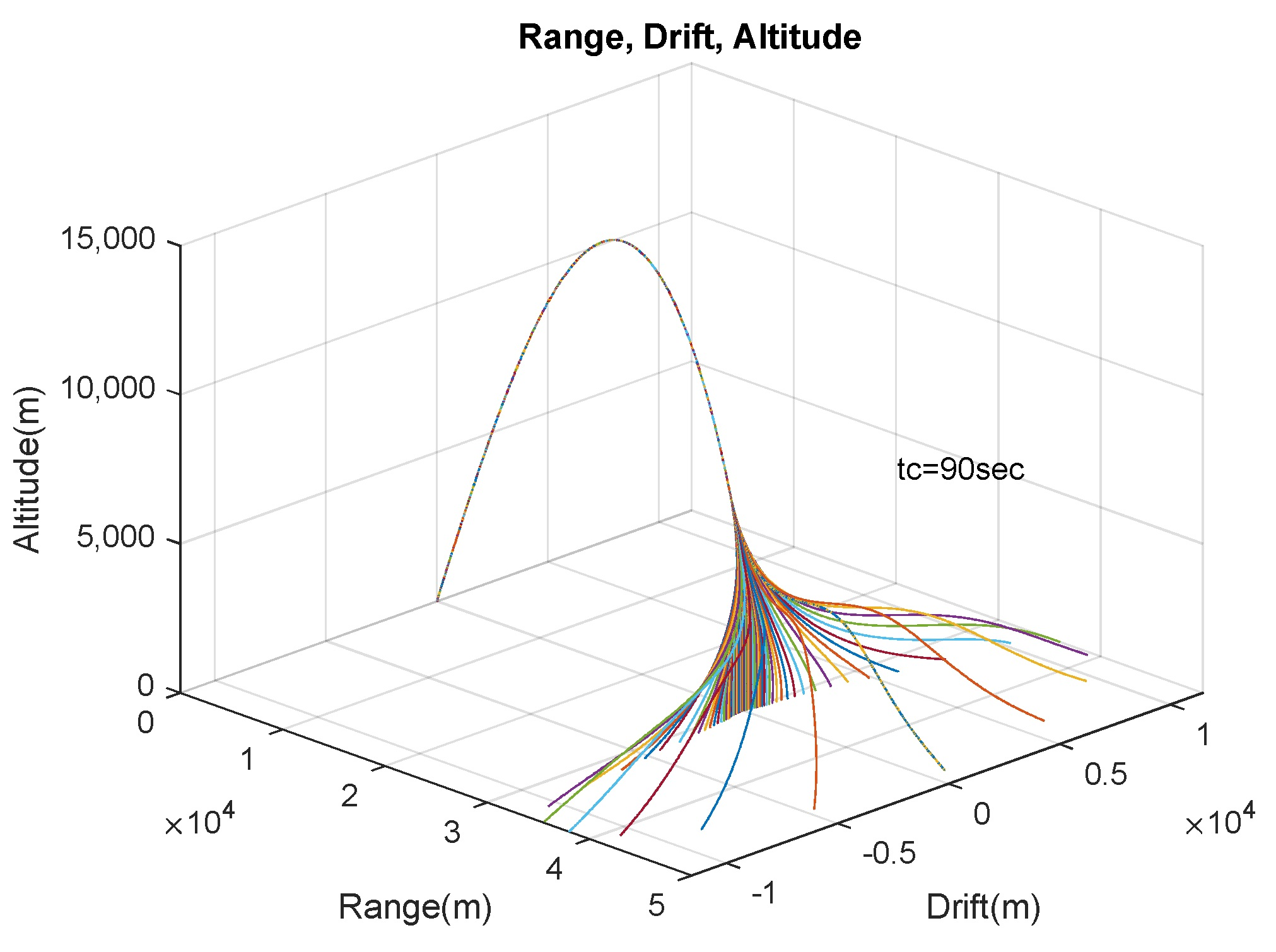
Computer simulation of artillery rocket using GPS trajectory correction fuze in the terminal phase

Common examples include long-range air-to-air missiles that use semi-active radar homing (SARH) during most of the missile's flight, and then use an infrared seeker or active radar homing once they approach their target. Similar examples include surface-to-air missiles, anti-ballistic missiles, and some anti-tank missiles.

== Concept ==
Radar beams are cone-shaped, spreading out from the diameter of the antenna at a characteristic angle that is a function of the size of the antenna and its wavelength. This means that as one moves away from the radar, its accuracy continues to degrade while the signal grows weaker. This makes it difficult to use the radar signal itself as the guidance signal, a system known as beam riding, except for very short-range engagements.

However, the signal being reflected off the target also forms a cone shape centred on the target, but with a much greater spread angle. This leads to one of the most common types of radar-based missile guidance, semi-active radar homing, or SARH. This places a small receiver in the nose of the missile that listens for the signals reflected off the target, and therefore grows more accurate and powerful as the missile approaches the target.

However, after launch the target return is at a minimum. While the launch platform may have no trouble picking up the signal from a distant target, the much smaller antenna in the missile may not be receiving enough of a signal to properly track. In these cases, some other form of guidance is used to get the missile into the range where the signal is stronger. Examples would be radio control (command guidance) or inertial guidance systems, which fly the missile closer to the target. In this role, these are known as "midcourse guidance" systems.

In practice, terminal guidance systems are often optical or active radar systems, in an effort to greatly increase accuracy. These systems often have many times the accuracy of solutions like SARH, but operate only at short ranges, on the order of a few kilometers. Missiles that are designed to operate entirely within the range of these sorts of systems, like heat seeking missiles, do not use the term "terminal guidance" because they use the same guidance system throughout their flight.

== See also ==
- Countermeasure
- Precision bombing
- Precision-guided munition
- Guided bomb
- Guidance system
- Proximity fuze
- Proximity sensor
- Artillery fuze
- Magnetic proximity fuze
- Missile
