= Salim Mehmud =

Pakistani rocket scientist and nuclear engineer

- Born: Uttar Pradesh British India
- Citizenship: Pakistani
- Education: University of Punjab; Oak Ridge Institute for Science and Education; Oak Ridge National Laboratory
- Known for: Pakistan's Space Program and missile technology
- Awards: Sitara-e-Imtiaz (1990); French Medal for Aeronautics (1989)
- Scientific career
- Fields: Nuclear Engineering
- Workplaces: Space and Upper Atmosphere Research Commission (SUPARCO); National Aeronautics and Space Administration (NASA); Pakistan Atomic Energy Commission (PAEC); Defence Science and Technology Organization (DESTO); Ministry of Communications of Pakistan (MCP); Argonne National Laboratory
- Doctoral advisor: Dr. William "Bill" Nelson

Salim Mehmud, also known as Salim Mehmood, is a Pakistani rocket scientist and nuclear engineer. Mehmud worked in the Apollo Program for NASA. He is a former chairman of Space and Upper Atmosphere Research Commission (SUPARCO). He also served as chief scientist at the Defence Science and Technology Organization.

== NASA career ==
Mehmud, who was working at an Oak Ridge National Laboratory as a nuclear engineer, was asked by Dr. Ishrat Hussain Usmani to go to the Pakistani Embassy in Washington, D.C., and meet professor Abdus Salam along with fellow nuclear engineer Tariq Mustafa. After a formal meeting, the engineers were personally asked by Salam to join NASA.

Mehmud and Mustafa were assigned to conduct research in space and rocket technology. They at first declined Salam's offer and vowed to work for Pakistan's nuclear program, according to an interview by CNBC Pakistan. However, at Salam's insistence, Mehmud and Mustafa flew to Greenbelt, Maryland, on a Douglas DC-6, where they visited the Goddard Space Flight Center and examined American advances in rocket technology. According to Mehmud, rocket science was more challenging than it seemed. After the visit, Mustafa and Mehmud agreed to work for NASA.

== Role in the development of NASA's solid rockets ==
Mehmud and Mustafa joined NASA in 1961. Mehmud was trained at the Goddard Space Center in rocket technology. He was one of the earliest pioneers of Nike-Cajun and Judi-Dart, solid fuel propellent based rockets. He closely collaborated with NASA scientists and engineers in the development of solid fuel sounding rockets during the 1960s.

== SUPARCO career and chairman ==
In 1961, Mehmud joined SUPARCO, the National Space Agency of Pakistan, at the request of Salam. He was immediately transferred to SUPARCO's rocket fabrication laboratory. Mehmud was one of the distinguished members of SUPARCO's team who launched the Satellite Launch Vehicle technology based-Rehbar-I under the direction of Air Cdre. dr. Wladysław Józef Marian Turowicz. He then was sent back to NASA, where he specialised in satellite and rocket technology. He then travelled with Turowicz to the United States where both had studied and conduct research in space and rocket technology. Mehmud went back to Pakistan, where he carried out his research in rocket science and satellite launch vehicles under the Turowicz's supervision. Along with Turowicz, was responsible for installing the launch pads and computer facility at the Sonmiani Flight Test Range.

On 15 December 1980, with the support of PAEC Chairman Munir Ahmad Khan, President of Pakistan General Zia appointed Salim Mehmud as chief executive officer of SUPARCO and asked him to submit necessary recommendations for the upgrade of SUPARCO to the status of a full-fledged commission.

=== Hatf missile program ===
In 1980, he was made the chairman of SUPARCO with the support of Pakistan Atomic Energy Commission chairman Munir Ahmad Khan. He successfully convinced General Zia to set up funds for SUPARCO. Zia, who was a strong advocate for the space program, allowed SUPARCO to develop indigenous satellite capabilities. During the 1980s, he started the Hatf Missile Program and was its principal figure and scientist. Under his leadership on 23 March 1989, on the Republic Day of Pakistan, SUPARCO, along with Engineering Research Laboratories, publicly tested the Hatf Missile.

=== Design of Hatf ===
The Hatf-I, the first derivative, was designed as a highly mobile, tactical system. The missiles are said to have been derived from the second-stage of the French Eridan missile system. Due to difficulty in acquiring the technology needed for satellite development in the 1980s, the first derivative of the Hatf missile is designed with zero or no satellite guidance. It can be considered an artillery rocket. It is ground mobile and can be launched from a transporter erector launcher (TEL).

=== Badr satellite program ===
In 1984, Salim Mehmud quickly launched the Badr satellite program. The development and the construction of Badr-1, Pakistan's first domestically-built digital communication satellite, was started. A small team of SUPARCO scientists and engineers who had studied and trained at the University of Surrey were the part of the university's UO-9, UO-11 and UO-22 hamsat miniature satellite development and program, began the development of the satellite. Mehmud then briefed General Zia and suggested launching the satellite from the Pakistani Satellite Launch Vehicle (SLV). However, having found difficulties in SLV-required technology, the idea of the Pakistani SLV was postponed and later was cancelled. Mehmud retired from SUPARCO in 1989 as a chief scientist and was transferred to Defence Science & Technology Organisation (DESTO). In 1990, Badr-1 was launched via Long March 2E rocket from Xichang Satellite Launch Center.

== Research papers ==
- Pakistan's Space Programme, by Salim Mehmud, published as a part of Space Policy in August 1989.
- Pakistan and Earth Observation System, by Salim Mehmud.
- Pakistan and Geostationary satellites, by Salim Mehmud
