= Badr-B =

Pakistani earth observation satellite

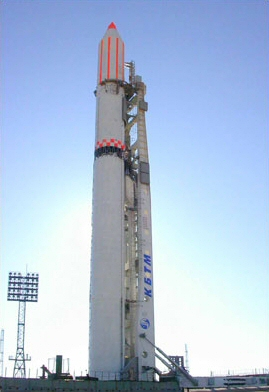
- Badr-B atop a Zenit-2 rocket, before the launch
- Mission type: Earth Observation Satellite; Earth science
- Operator: SUPARCO
- COSPAR ID: 2001-056C
- SATCAT no.: 27003
- Website: www.suparco.gov.pk/pages/badrb.asp
- Mission duration: 2 years

Spacecraft properties
- Manufacturer: SUPARCO; Space Innovations Limited; Rutherford Laboratory
- Launch mass: 68.5 kilograms (151 lb)

Start of mission
- Launch date: 10 December 2001, 17:18:57 UTC
- Rocket: Zenit-2
- Launch site: Baikonur 45/1

Orbital parameters
- Reference system: Geocentric
- Regime: Sun-synchronous
- Eccentricity: 0.0018975332
- Perigee altitude: 986.0 kilometres (612.7 mi)
- Apogee altitude: 1,014.0 kilometres (630.1 mi)
- Inclination: 99.7 degrees
- Period: 105.0 minutes
- Epoch: 10 December 2001, 12:19:00 UTC

The Badr-B (Urdu: بدر-۲; also known as Badr-II, meaning Full Moon-2) was Pakistan's second spacecraft and the first Earth observation satellite launched into Sun-synchronous orbit on 10 December 2001 at 09:15 by SUPARCO — Pakistan's national space agency. Badr-B was a microsatellite, weighing approximately 70 kg, and contained a computerized system to conduct studies on gravity gradients. Badr-B was a research satellite to explore the upper atmosphere and the near space, carrying a large array of instruments for geophysical research.

The Badr-B payload was equipped with several CCD cameras, compact dosimeter, a telemetry system, charge detector and a temperature control unit. It is intended to complete and update the Islamabad Mission Control Center (IMCC) and to test the remote sensing CCD instruments.

== Launch history ==
The Badr-B project was launched by SUPARCO in 1992, following the success of the Badr-I in 1990. The programme was funded by Science Ministry and the construction of the programme was completed in Instrumentation Laboratories in Karachi. The United Kingdom's Space Innovations Limited, plc (SIL) also joined this programme in 1993 as it had constructed the instrumentation of this satellite. The Badr-B satellite mass was about 30% larger than the Badr-I. Most of the equipment was developed at the DESTO and the spacecraft designing took place in Instrumentation Laboratories in Karachi. Space Innovations Limited took contributed technical assistance required for assembling the Badr-B. A Mission control center was established at Islamabad where several supercomputers and its systems were installed by Space Innovations Limited. In 1995, a computer system and the system software was designed and installed by Pakistan Software Export Systems (PSES) while COMSATS helped installing the large computer screen at the Islamabad mission control center. Overall, the work on Badr-B was completed in 1996 by SUPARCO and it was originally planned to launch from Tilla Launch Complex but it was objected as the country had no launch facility at that time. The CCD cameras were developed by the Rutherford Appleton Laboratory (RAL) who took the interest in the development of the Badr-B in 1995.

Badr-B was developed in 1996 but the delay of Russian space-rocket put the satellite on hold for more than 4 years. Abdul Qadeer Khan unsuccessfully attempted to launch the satellite from the Sonmiani Launch Complex using Ghauri-1missile as the transportation vehicle which was denied by the government at that time. In 2001, the Air Force Strategic Command flew the Badr-B to Kazakhstan where it was launched from Baikonur Cosmodrome on 10 December 2001 abroad a Ukrainian Zenit-2 rocket.

== Design ==
The economic cost of the Badr-B is not publicly known but it is estimated to be more costly than the first satellite, Badr-I. For its design, the Badar-B is far more complex and sophisticated than the first satellite. The external body of the Badr-B is made of Space grade Aluminium alloy with a total mass of 70 kg. Badr-B was launched in a Sun-synchronous orbit of 1050 km with an earth orbital period of 106 minutes. Badr-B is a cube with side dimensions of 510 mm x 510 mm x 465 mm and a gravity gradient vector system to stabilize the satellite to its mission control centre. A typical orbital and terminal pass over to country's space orbit entry would last between 10 and 15 minutes.

Badr-B internal structure was made of space qualified aluminum T-6 alloy. The gallium arsenide (GaAs) solar arrays were used to provide and generate the electronic power during the sunlit periods. The nickel cadmium (NiCd) batteries stored power for use during the eclipse periods. Earth pointing single axis stabilization was achieved by the use of a 6 m gravity gradient boom with a trip mass of 4 kg.

== Launch plans and site selections ==
The SUPARCO set its deadline to launch the satellite in 1994 but, due to the satellite being upgraded time passed and SUPARCO lost the space orbital entry slot. SUPARCO then planned to Badr-B in 1995 or as early of 1996 but did not materialize the plan. By 1996, Badr-B was completed and was ready to launch but due to upcoming elections in 1997, the plan was put on hold. Since SUPARCO had no launch complex, it began to hold talks with China and Russia at the lowest rate. In 1998, following the restrictions applied on Pakistan after it had conducted atomic tests (See Chagai-I and Chagai-II), SUPARCO was unable to launch the satellite, therefore putting the satellite in storage.

Delaying of the satellite's launch programme further frustrated the scientific community, therefore, Government of Pakistan launched the work on Shaheen-III and Ghauri-III expendable rockets in 1998. In 2001, senior scientist Abdul Qadeer Khan approached the Pakistan Government to receive permission to launch the satellite from either Tilla Launch Complex or Sonmiani Launch Complex. However, then-CMLA General Pervez Musharraf denied the request of Khan.

In 2001, the Pakistan Academy of Sciences held the physics and mathematics conference on astrophysics in Pakistan where scientists from all over the country were invited to come to Nathiagali. In a media interview given at Nathiagali, Abdul Qadeer Khan maintained that, "Pakistan has very robust nuclear I.R.B.M. system which can launch geostationary orbiting satellites. All Pakistan has to do is to erase Delhi or Calcutta from the target and point it towards the sky. Instead of Hydrogen bombs and Atomic bombs, the missiles can easily carry a payload of an 80 kg satellite into the sky". Astrophysicist Shahid Kureshi also argued that [IRBM] missiles have very robust and effective electronics and computer system, the [SLV]s used the similar technology. Taking part in this discussion, Nuclear physicist Pervez Hoodbhoy believed that "If we [Pakistan] can launch a missile up to a range of 1,500 km, why not build an [SLV] that can launch low-atmosphere satellites?".

Abdul Majid, an astrophysicist, countered the pressure in a media interview in 1999 given to Dawn Newspapers, and in his own words, Majid summed up that, "with Meteor-3M (a Soviet satellite), other four satellites one each from [Pakistan], Malaysia, Morocco and the United States are to be mounted on the bigger Russian rocket. It was only the Pakistan's Badr-B satellite which had met the deadline set by the Russians. The deadline was in April. All the other satellites failed to meet the deadline".

== Launch and mission ==
After receiving criticism from the scientific society, the SUPARCO succeeded in a talks held with Russian Federal Space Agency on a possible low rates. The PAF's Air Force Strategic Command flew the satellite on C-130 Hercules to Kazakhstan. The Badr-B was taken to Baikonur Cosmodrome along with Russian satellites which were also stored for the final assembly. The Badr-B, along with Soviet built Meteor-3M, was installed at the Zenit-2 expandable rocket. A high level delegation of SUPARCO headed by Major-General Raza Hussain arrived at the Baikonur Cosmodrome to witness the launch. At 17:18UTC, the Badr-B was launched along with Meteor-3M with an ascending node time of about 09:15.

== Experiments ==
The Badr-B conduct four major on-board experiments, including taking the snap shots of Earth images, and data storage and forwarding to its mission control center. The Badr-B also used the radiation dosimeter to measure the exposure of Sun's ionizing radiation and, also used to study the electromagnetic field of Earth. The Badr-B also conduct studies on charge battery when it is exposed to Solar flare and forwarded Solar winds. Expected results were sent to its mission control center in Islamabad.

== Achievements ==
Overall, the Badr-B was an ambitious project that was intended to learn and developed the low-cost EOS satellites, and to build the infrastructure for larger satellites. The Badr-B also gave the scientists occasion to understand the usage of technology for Earth imaging by using the CCD sensors; it also helped the scientists study the impact of solar flares on the environment of Earth. The Badr-B stimulated the research on astrophysics and astro-particle physics that have encouraged the scientific community to continue their research on peaceful uses of space.

However, its achievements were undermined after SUPARCO had lost the orbital slot in four consecutive years. The scientific community apprehended the delay in satellite launch could lead to loss of the country's orbital slot. In 2002, SUPARCO began to conduct further studies and launched the more ambitious and complex project which formed the basis derivatives of PRSS; later this programme was integrated with Pakistan's Space Vision 2040 propramme. Under the Space Programme 2040, the Badr-B was replaced with more complex and technologically advance high-resolution satellite PRSS-O1, which was launched in 2018.

== NASA links ==
- NSSDC, National Space Science Data Center. "NASA: BADR-2". National Space Science Data Center. NASA.
- NSSDC ID, International Designator. "Badr-B Description". NASA.
