= Chronology of Pakistan's rocket tests =

Chronology of rocket tests by SUPARCO, Pakistan

The chronology of Pakistan's rocket tests entails the series of sounding rocket launches conducted by the Space & Upper Atmosphere Research Commission (SUPARCO) aimed at advancing Pakistan's space program. These launches were instrumental in developing high-altitude rockets, fostering scientific exploration, and providing invaluable data for research in physics and atmospheric sciences.

Commencing in 1962 and continuing until its partial termination in 1972, SUPARCO successfully launched over 200 sounding rockets. These missions were pivotal in studying the upper atmosphere, including investigations into temperature gradients, wind velocities, and atmospheric density.

An important milestone in Pakistan's space exploration history was the successful launch of Rehbar-I, signifying the nation's pioneering role among developing countries, the Islamic world, and South Asia. Ranking third in Asia, this achievement underscored Pakistan's growing prominence in the field of space exploration.

Originally conceived as a SUPARCO initiative, the space mission program remains active to this day. Over time, various aerospace authorities and institutions, both domestically and through international collaborations, have assumed roles in advancing Pakistan's space capabilities. Since the late 1980s, the focus has shifted towards research and development, with an emphasis on ballistic missile testing alongside continued scientific exploration.

== Spaceflight by year ==
| Rocket launch | Launch Date | Mission | Institutional authority | Launch site | Outcomes | Derived from |
|---|---|---|---|---|---|---|
| Rehbar-I | June 7, 1962; 14:45 GMT | Aeronomy | SUPARCO | Flight Test Range | Level 1; Success | Nike-Cajun |
| Rehbar-II | June 11, 1962; 14:50 GMT | Aeronomy | SUPARCO | Flight Test Range | Level 1; Success | Nike-Cajun |
| Rehbar-3 | March 18, 1964; 14:50 GMT | Aeronomy | SUPARCO | Flight Test Range | Level 1; Success | Judi-Dart |
| Rehbar-4 | January 12, 1966; 12:30 GMT | Aeronomy | SUPARCO | Flight Test Range | Level 2; Success | Judi-Dart |
| Rehbar-5 | January 26, 1966; 12:18 GMT | Aeronomy | SUPARCO | Flight Test Range | Level 2; Success | Judi-Dart |
| Rehbar-6 | February 16, 1966; 04:30 GMT | Aeronomy | SUPARCO | Flight Test Range | Level 2; Success | Judi-Dart |
| Rehbar-7 | January 26, 1966; 12:18 GMT | Aeronomy | SUPARCO | Flight Test Range | Level 2; Success | Judi-Dart |
| Rehbar-15 | May 3, 1967; 14:29 GMT | Aeronomy | SUPARCO | Flight Test Range | Level 1; Success | Centaure |
| Shahpar-1 | May 5, 1967; 14:29 GMT | Test Mission | SUPARCO | Flight Test Range | Level 1; Success | Dragon |
| Rehbar-16 | May 7, 1967; 14:30 GMT | Aeronomy | SUPARCO | Flight Test Range | Level 1; Success | Centaure |
| Rehbar-17 | March 23, 1968; 19:04 GMT | Aeronomy | SUPARCO | Flight Test Range | Level 1; Success | Centaure |
| Shahpar-2 | March 29, 1968; 19:20 GMT | Test Mission | SUPARCO | Flight Test Range | Level 1; Success | Dragon |
| Rehbar-18 | April 3, 1968; 05:38 GMT | Aeronomy | SUPARCO | Flight Test Range | Level 1; Success | Centaure |
| Rehbar-19 | February 9, 1969; 13:46 GMT | Aeronomy | SUPARCO | Flight Test Range | Level 2; Failure | Centaure |
| Rehbar-20 | February 13, 1969; 13:48 GMT | Aeronomy | SUPARCO | Flight Test Range | Level 2; Failure | Centaure |
| Rehnuma-1 | March 31, 1969; 14:18 GMT | Aeronomy | SUPARCO | Flight Test Range | Level 1; Partial Success | Centaure |
| Rehnuma-2 | June 16, 1969; 14:34 GMT | Aeronomy | SUPARCO | Flight Test Range | Level 2; Success | Judi-Dart |
| Rehnuma-3 | July 20, 1969; 14:30 GMT | Aeronomy | SUPARCO | Flight Test Range | Level 2; Success | Judi-Dart |
| Rehnuma-4 | July 30, 1969; 14:45 GMT | Aeronomy | SUPARCO | Flight Test Range | Level 2; Success | Judi-Dart |
| Rehnuma-5 | August 15, 1969; 14:30 GMT | Aeronomy | SUPARCO | Flight Test Range | Level 2; Success | Judi-Dart |
| Rehnuma-6 | September 10, 1969; 14:30 GMT | Aeronomy | SUPARCO | Flight Test Range | Level 2; Success | Judi-Dart |
| Rehnuma-7 | October 22, 1969; 13:50 GMT | Aeronomy | SUPARCO | Flight Test Range | Level 2; Success | Judi-Dart |
| Rehnuma-8 | November 19, 1969; 13:10 GMT | Aeronomy | SUPARCO | Flight Test Range | Level 2; Success | Judi-Dart |
| Rehnuma-9 | November 20, 1969; 13:50 GMT | Aeronomy | SUPARCO | Flight Test Range | Level 2; Success | Judi-Dart |
| Rehnuma-10 | December 17, 1969; 13:10 GMT | Aeronomy | SUPARCO | Flight Test Range | Level 2; Success | Judi-Dart |
| Rehnuma-11 | December 31, 1969; 13:50 GMT | Aeronomy | SUPARCO | Flight Test Range | Level 2; Success | Judi-Dart |
| Judi-Dart 1 | January 14, 1970; 13:00 GMT | Aeronomy | SUPARCO | Flight Test Range | Level 2; Success | Judi-Dart |
| Judi-Dart 1 | January 14, 1970; 15:15 GMT | Aeronomy | SUPARCO | Flight Test Range | Level 2; Success | Judi-Dart |
| Judi-Dart 1 | January 14, 1970; 14:00 GMT | Aeronomy | SUPARCO | Flight Test Range | Level 2; Success | Judi-Dart |
| Judi-Dart 1 | February 11, 1970; 13:30 GMT | Aeronomy | SUPARCO | Flight Test Range | Level 2; Success | Judi-Dart |
| Judi-Dart 2 | March 11, 1970; 14:30 GMT | Aeronomy | SUPARCO | Flight Test Range | Level 2; Success | Judi-Dart |
| Judi-Dart 2 | March 11, 1970; 14:30 GMT | Aeronomy | SUPARCO | Flight Test Range | Level 2; Success | Judi-Dart |
| Rehbar 21 | March 27, 1970; 00:00 GMT | Aeronomy | SUPARCO | Flight Test Range | Level 2; Success | Nike-Cajun |
| Rehbar 22 | March 28, 1970; 15:45 GMT | Aeronomy | SUPARCO | Flight Test Range | Level 2; Success | Nike-Cajun |
| Judi-Dart 2 | March 28, 1970; 00:00 GMT | Aeronomy | SUPARCO | Flight Test Range | Level 2; Success | Judi-Dart |
| Judi-Dart 1 | April 15, 1970; 14:45 GMT | Aeronomy | SUPARCO | Flight Test Range | Level 2; Success | Judi Dart |
| Judi-Dart 1 | April 15, 1970; 13:45 GMT | Aeronomy | SUPARCO | Flight Test Range | Level 2; Success | Judi Dart |
| Judi-Dart 1 | June 17, 1970; 14:50 GMT | Aeronomy | SUPARCO | Flight Test Range | Level 2; Success | Judi Dart |
| Judi-Dart 1 | July 15, 1970; 15:05 GMT | Aeronomy | SUPARCO | Flight Test Range | Level 2; Success | Judi Dart |
| Judi-Dart 1 | October 21, 1970; 15:45 GMT | Aeronomy | SUPARCO | Flight Test Range | Level 2; Success | Judi Dart |
| Judi-Dart 1 | November 25, 1970; 13:14 GMT | Aeronomy | SUPARCO | Flight Test Range | Level 2; Success | Judi Dart |
| Judi-Dart 1 | December 30, 1970; 14:50 GMT | Aeronomy | SUPARCO | Flight Test Range | Level 1; Success | Judi Dart |
| Rehbar-23 | April 7, 1972; 14:20 GMT | Ionosphere Mission | SUPARCO | Flight Test Range | Level 1; Success | Centaure |
| Rehbar-24 | April 8, 1972; 14:18 GMT | Ionosphere Mission | SUPARCO | Flight Test Range | Level 1; Success | Centaure |
| Shahpar-3 | April 28, 1972; 00:18 GMT | Test Mission | SUPARCO | Flight Test Range | Level 1; Success | Centaure |
| Hatf-I | October 20, 1989; 00:00 GMT | Test Mission | SUPARCO | Flight Test Range | Success | |
| Abdali-I | March 3, 2007 | Test mission | SUPARCO | Flight Test Range | Success | |
