= Space Vision 2040 (Pakistan) =

Space program of SUPARCO, Pakistan

The Space Programme 2040 is a satellite development and launch initiative undertaken by SUPARCO, Pakistan's national space agency. The program aims to replace the country's existing Badr satellite series and establish a new fleet of satellites.

The program's timeline spans from 2011 to 2040, during which SUPARCO has planned to launch five geostationary (GEO) satellites and six low Earth orbit (LEO) satellites. The first satellite under this program, PakSAT-1R, was successfully launched on August 11, 2011, from the Xichang Satellite Launch Center in China. The primary objectives of the Space Programme 2040 are to advance satellite technology, promote socio-economic development, conduct scientific research, and develop military capabilities.

The program received official approval from Prime Minister Yousaf Raza Gillani in July 2011, with funding allocated in the 2011 Pakistan fiscal year budget.

== Remote sensing satellites ==
Prior to the Space Programme 2040, SUPARCO had successfully launched the Badr-II satellite in 2001. Badr-II was Pakistan's first low Earth orbit (LEO) satellite and was launched from the Baikonur Cosmodrome by Russia's Roscosmos.

A key component of the Space Programme 2040 was the development and launch of six remote sensing satellites. SUPARCO aimed to launch its first remote sensing satellite, the PRSS-1, in 2018.

- PRSC-EO1
- PRSC-S1
- PRSC-EO2
- PRSC-S2
- PRSC-O3
- PRSC-S3

The satellites that have launched:

- PRSC-S1
- PRSC-EO1
- PRSC-EO2
- PRSC-EO3

== Communications satellites ==
The Paksat-IR satellite marked a historic milestone in Pakistan's space program. Launched on August 11, 2011, at 9:17 PM (PKT), it was the first geostationary (GEO) satellite to be deployed as part of the Space Programme 2040. The satellite was carried into orbit by a Long March 3E rocket from the Xichang Satellite Launch Center in China's Sichuan province.

The GEO satellites that are under development or proposed are listed below:

- Paksat-MM1R
- Paksat-MM2
- Paksat-II

The satellites that have launched:

- Paksat-MM1R

== Electro-Optical Observation satellites ==
The following Satellites have been launched:

- PAUSAT-1 satellite
- PRSC-EO1 satellite
