= List of space facilities =

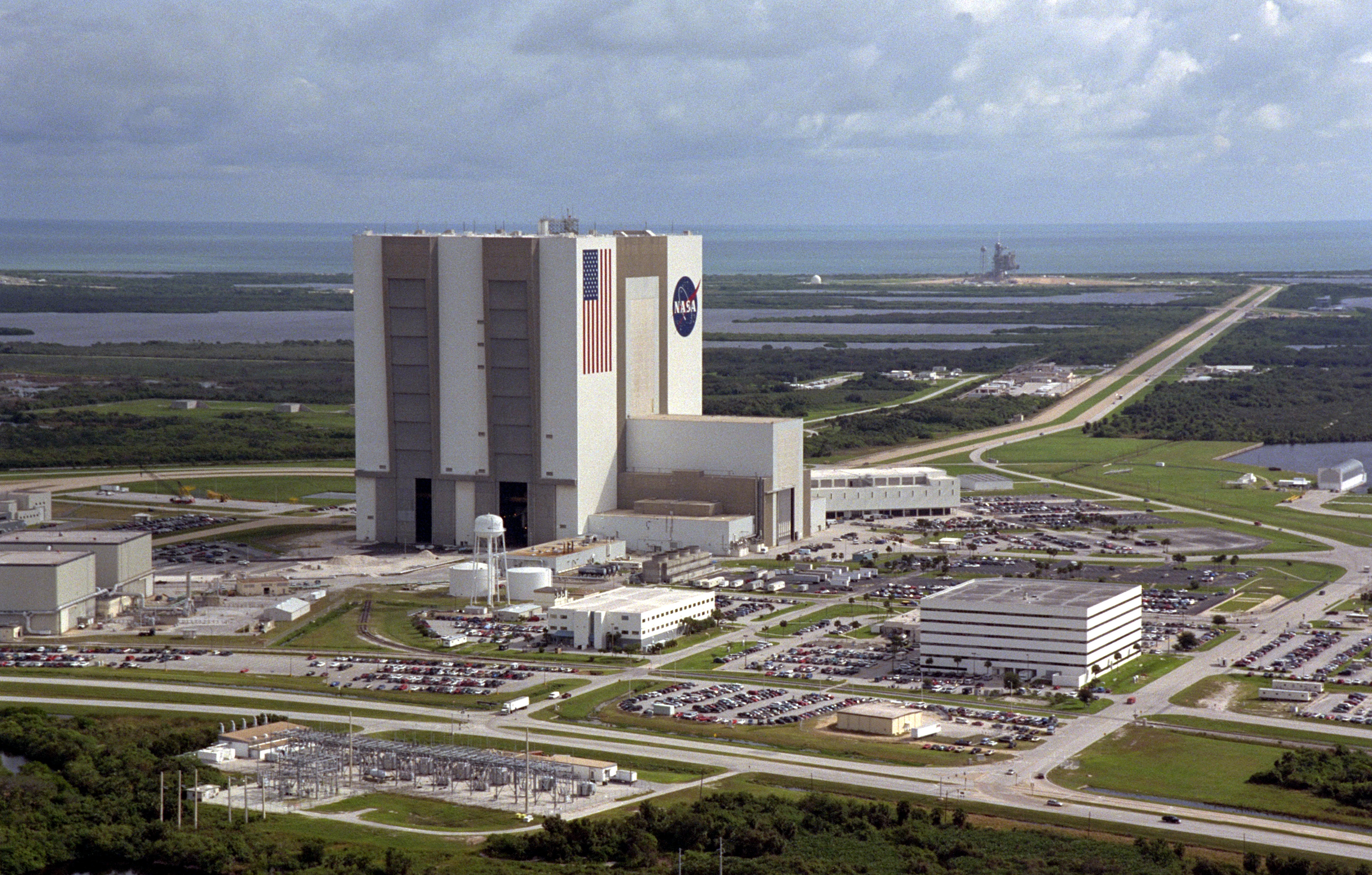
The Kennedy Space Centre

Below is a list of space facilities by country.

== Algeria ==
- Algerian Space Agency

== Brazil ==
- Alcântara Space Center
- Barreira do Inferno Launch Center
- Space Operations Center

== Belgium ==
- Liege Space Center
- Euro Space Center

== Canada ==
- John H. Chapman Space Centre
- Telus World of Science, Edmonton

== Germany ==
- European Space Operations Centre
- German Space Operations Center
- Hubble European Space Agency Information Centre
- European Astronaut Centre

== France ==
- Toulouse Space Centre
- Guiana Space Centre
- Cannes Mandelieu Space Center

== India ==
- Vikram Sarabhai Space Centre
- Space Applications Centre
- Satish Dhawan Space Centre
- U R Rao Satellite Center
- ISRO Propulsion Complex

== Italy ==
- Broglio Space Center

== Japan ==
- Uchinoura Space Center
- Tanegashima Space Center

== Kazakhstan ==
- Baikonur Cosmodrome

== South Korea ==
- Naro Space Center
- Rokaf HQ Space Center

== Netherlands ==
- European Space Research and Technology Centre

== Norway ==
- Andøya Space Center
- Norwegian Space Centre

== Philippines ==
- Mabuhaysat Subic Space Center
- Mabuhaysat Zamboanga Space Center

== Pakistan ==
- Sonmiani Spaceport
- Satellite Ground Station (SUPARCO)

== Russia ==
- Babakin Space Centre
- Plesetsk Cosmodrome
- Svobodny Cosmodrome
- Titov Main Test and Space Systems Control Centre
- Vostochny Cosmodrome

See also: Baikonur Cosmodrome (Kazakhstan)

== Sweden ==
- Esrange Space Center

== United Arab Emirates ==
- Mohammed bin Rashid Space Center

== United Kingdom ==
- National Space Centre
- Surrey Space Centre
- Harwell Science and Innovation Campus
- Jodrell Bank Observatory

== United States ==
- Goddard Space Flight Center
- John C. Stennis Space Center
- Kennedy Space Center
- Lyndon B. Johnson Space Center and Space Center Houston
- Marshall Space Flight Center

== See also ==
- List of launch complexes
