= Tariq Mustafa =

Pakistani mechanical engineer

Dr. Tariq Mustafa
- Born: 1934 (age 91–92); Faisalabad, Pakistan
- Citizenship: Pakistan
- Education: Government College Lahore, University of London, University of Greenwich
- Known for: Pakistan Space and Nuclear Program; Modernization of defense research and production Modernization and privatization of public sector industries Founding of the Pakistan Paralympic Movement; Participating in science and religion discourse
- Awards: Tamgha-e-Imtiaz (Medal of Distinction) 1963 Honorary Commander, Pakistan Navy (1973) Honorary D.Sc - University of Greenwich, United Kingdom (2013)
- Scientific career
- Fields: Mechanical Engineering, Nuclear Engineering and Space Technology
- Workplaces: Pakistan Atomic Energy Commission (PAEC); United States Atomic Energy Commission (USAEC); United Kingdom Atomic Energy Authority(UKAEA); Centre National d'Études Spatiales (CNES); National Aeronautics and Space Administration (NASA); Space and Upper Atmosphere Research Commission (SUPARCO); Royal Arsenal Woolwich (United Kingdom)

Dr. Tariq Mustafa (born 1934) is a Pakistani mechanical engineer with a first class honors degree from London University specializing in nuclear and space technology. He led the establishment of Pakistan's space and rocket technology program and subsequently served in the Government of Pakistan as Federal Secretary of the Ministries of Defense Production, Science and Technology, Public Sector Industry, Petroleum and Natural Resources and Privatization. He is the founder and current Chairperson of Pakistan's National Paralympics Committee (PNPC), President of the South Asian Paralympics Committee and Vice President of the Asian Paralympic Committee. His lifelong interests are reason, revelation and the future of humanity. He has been active in discourse about science and religion and is the author of The Case for God - Based on Reason and Evidence, not Groundless Faith. In September 2015, he was appointed as a member of the Governing Council of the Institute for Religion in the Age of Science (IRAS).

== Education ==
Dr. Tariq Mustafa is a graduate of University of London where he received his Bachelor of Science (B.S.) in mechanical engineering with first class honours while also doing an engineering apprenticeship at the Royal Arsenal in Woolwich. He also received an Honorary DSc from University of Greenwich in 2013. In 1956, he joined the United Kingdom Atomic Energy Authority and did his post-graduate research in the field of nuclear technology and nuclear power studies. In 1957, Tariq Mustafa attended the first international Reactor School at the United Kingdom Atomic Energy Research Establishment Harwell. Subsequently, he participated in the first international power reactor operations course at Calder Hall, UK. Tariq Mustafa was selected in 1957 by Nobel Laureate Abdul Salam to join the Pakistan Atomic Energy Commission. He was then selected for a Fellowship to the Oak Ridge National Laboratories of the U.S. Atomic Energy Commission.

== Space career ==
In 1961, Tariq Mustafa was appointed to lead the team to establish Pakistan's first rocket range in Sonmiani (Baluchistan) and the launching of the Rehbar-1 and Shahpar series of rockets after receiving training at the Wallops Island range and Goddard Space Flight Center of NASA. On 7 June 1962 at 1953 hours, Pakistan launched its first solid-fuel rocket into space. Later, Tariq Mustafa worked closely with Prof. Abdul Salam and Dr. I.H. Usmani (Chairman PAEC) and led the effort to obtain rocket manufacturing technology from France and established rocket manufacturing plants near Mauripur, Karachi.

He was the pioneer of Nike-Cajun and Judi-Dart, a solid fuel propellent based rocket. He closely collaborated with NASA scientists and engineers in the development of solid fuel sounding rockets during the 1960s, particularly the Judi-Dart Sounding Rocket Program. He associated with NASA's missile and space rocket program under the mutual agreement with the SUPARCO.

== Government and Public Service ==
During his 36-year career he has widely travelled to over fifty countries. He retired from the government of Pakistan in 1994 as a Senior Federal Secretary. Since then, he has devoted himself to the international discourse on Science and Religion and authored a book, Case for God - Based on Reason and Evidence, not Groundless Faith and has been a regular participant in several conferences related to this field.

From 1989 to 1990, he served as the chairman, Board of Governors of the Asia Pacific of Technology Transfer (APCCT) ESCAP.

After retirement, from 1995 to 1997 he was appointed as a World Bank Advisor on Privatization to Pakistan and then World Bank Advisor on Technology, where one of his most significant contribution was leading a successful outcome of the highly charged privatization of the Kot Addu thermal power plant, Asia's largest and most contentious privatization of the time as it was vehemently opposed by the labor unions

Since 1998 he has served as the President of the Pakistan Paralympics Committee, President of the South Asian Paralympics Committee and Vice President of the Asian Paralympics Committee. Under his stewardship, Pakistan has participated in the International Paralympic Games in Athens (2004), Beijing (2008), London (2012) as well as Asian and Regional games in which Pakistan team won over 55 medals, including 18 Gold medals

On acknowledgement of his services in the field of atomic energy, space technology and his work in the promotion of the Paralympics movement, the University of Greenwich awarded Tariq Mustafa an Honorary D.Sc. (Doctorate of Science) in July 2013

== Awards ==
- Tamgha-e-Imtiaz (Medal of Distinction), 1963
- Honorary Commander, Pakistan Navy (1973)
- Honorary D.Sc. - University of Greenwich, United Kingdom (2013)

== Publications ==
=== Bibliography ===
- Revelation: Criteria to Evaluate the Authenticity (2008)
- The Case for God: Based on Reason and Evidence (2009)
- The Future of Humanity.

=== Research papers ===
- Selected Articles The Case for God
- Danish Cartoon Controversy
- Newsweek- The God Debate
- Talk- Islamic Wedding
- The Way Out- Bin Laden
