= Pakistani missile research and development programme =

Pakistan technology initiative, established 1985

Hatf Programme
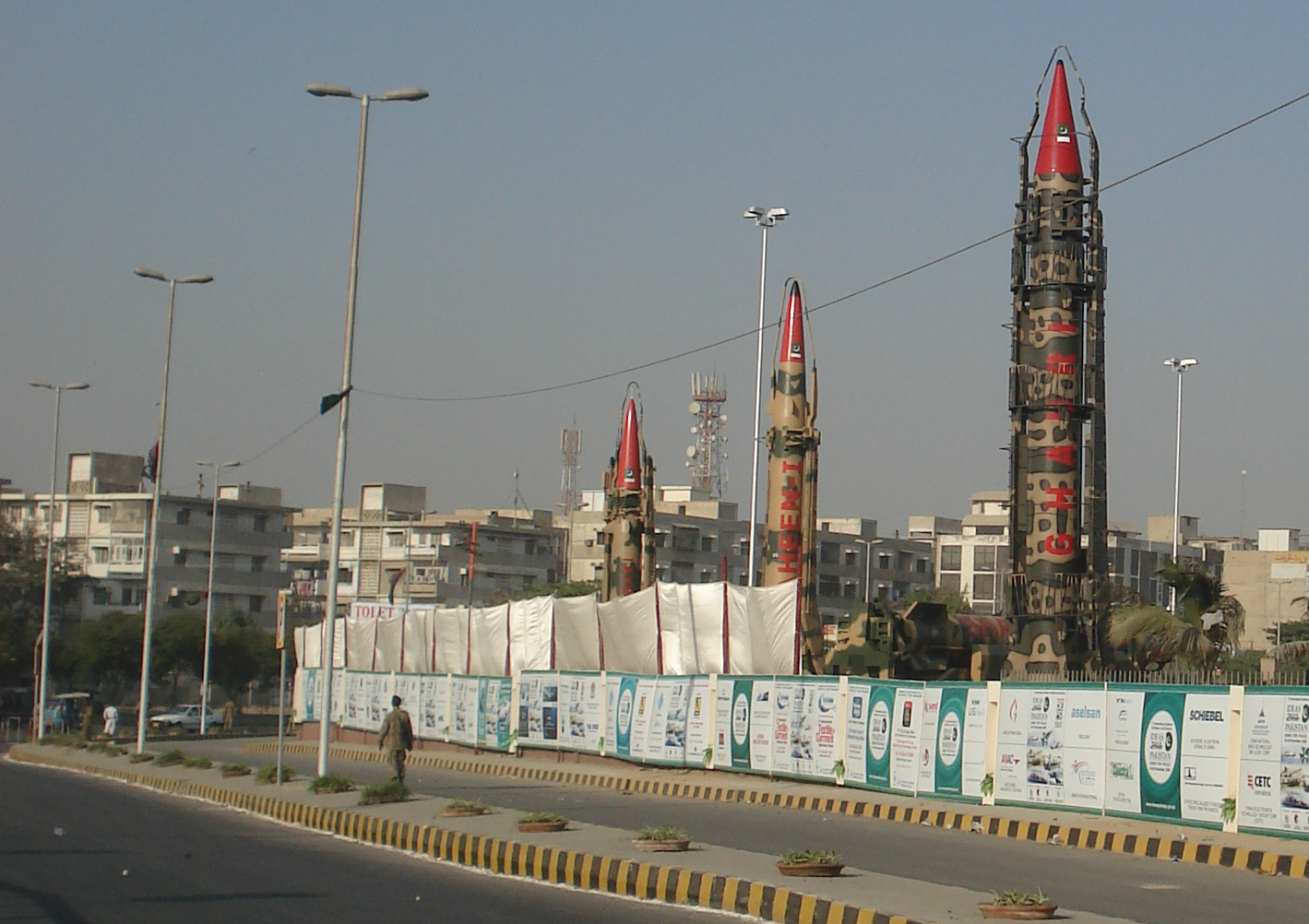
- The missile systems developed as part of the Hatf programme mounted on TEL with Pakistani military markings in display at the IDEAS in Karachi, 2008.
- Commercial?: No
- Type of project: Operational R&D
- Founder: Ministry of Defence (MoD)
- Country: Pakistan
- Established: 1985
- Budget: Classified

The Hatf Programme (Urdu: حتف, romanized: ḥāṯaʿf, lit. 'Target') was a classified programme by the Ministry of Defence (MoD) of Pakistan for the comprehensive research and development of guided missiles. Initiatives began in 1986-87 and received support from Prime Minister Benazir Bhutto in direct response to India's equivalent programme in 1989.

The Hatf programme was run by the Ministry of Defence, although policy guidance came directly from the Joint Staff Headquarters of the Pakistan Armed Forces.

== Programme overview ==
In 1985–87, planning and initiatives for the programme began in response to India's revealed missile programme. General M. A. Beg, then-army chief, hastily launched the programme, intending it to be led by SUPARCO.

The programme's feasibility proved more challenging than the nuclear weapons programme due to inadequate funding and a lack of focus on control systems and aerodynamics education. India, with existing knowledge based on Russian rockets, was already ahead in missile technology, developing its own independently. Furthermore, the Missile Technology Control Regime (MTCR), formed in 1987, hindered Pakistan's efforts to acquire programme components.

The Ministry of Defence eventually took over the Hatf programme, delegating it to its weapons laboratories and agencies to collaborate with SUPARCO. In 1989, India successfully test-fired its first variant of the Prithvi missile, which it had been developing independently since 1983. That same year, the SUPARCO test-fired the Hatf, which Prime Minister Benazir Bhutto immediately declared a success. However, the U.S. military dismissed the results, considering the missile an "inaccurate battlefield missile."

Under Prime Minister Benazir Bhutto, the Hatf programme was aggressively pursued to address the missile gap with India. The Benazir Bhutto government negotiated engineering education and training on rockets with China and later North Korea. Pakistani military officials documented that Pakistan made substantial cash payments to China and North Korea through its State Bank to acquire practical knowledge in aerospace engineering, controls engineering, programming and space sciences.

Despite constraints and limitations, the Hatf programme was made feasible, and former Prime Minister Benazir Bhutto is described as the "political architect of Pakistan's missile technology" by Emily MacFarquhar of the Alicia Patterson Foundation. In 2014, former Prime Minister Yousaf Raza Gillani acknowledged Benazir Bhutto's contribution, stating, "Benazir Bhutto gave this country the much-needed missile technology."

The programme eventually expanded and diversified with the successful development of cruise missiles and other strategic-level arsenals in the early 2000s.

=== Reports of ICBM Development Targeting Continental United States ===
According to a report published by Foreign Affairs magazine, Pakistan is advancing efforts to develop a nuclear-capable intercontinental ballistic missile (ICBM) capable of reaching the continental United States. If confirmed, such a development would represent a major leap in Islamabad’s strategic capabilities and could potentially alter its classification in U.S. strategic assessments, formally designating Pakistan as a nuclear adversary. The report underscores growing international concern over the trajectory and scope of Pakistan’s missile research and development programme.

=== Codenames ===
The Pakistani military issued a single military designation series, Hatf (Trans. Target), for all of its surface-to-surface guided ballistic missiles. This designation was selected by the research and development committee at the Army GHQ of the Pakistan Army, which provided policy guidance to the programme. In Turkish, "Hatf" means "Target" or "Aim point" and refers to the sword of Muhammad, which was believed to never miss its target.

The unofficial names, such as Ghauri, Ghaznavi, and Abdali, were codenames for developing projects assigned to defence contractors. These names were derived from historical figures involved in the Islamic conquest of South Asia. The contractors were issued the project names after the Turkish nomads invaded India from the historical region of Greater Khorasan.

Hatf Programme Overview
Military designation	Codename	Role	Deployment	Unit	Branch
Hatf-I	Hatf	SRBM	1992	Army Strategic Forces Command	Pakistan Army
Hatf-II	Abdali	SRBM	2002	Army Strategic Forces Command	Pakistan Army
Hatf-III	Ghaznavi	SRBM	2004	Army Strategic Forces Command	Pakistan Army
Hatf-IV	Shaheen	SRBM	2003	Army Strategic Forces Command	Pakistan Army
Hatf-V	Ghauri	MRBM	2003	Army Strategic Forces Command	Pakistan Army
Hatf-VI	Shaheen II	MRBM	2011	Army Strategic Forces Command	Pakistan Army
Hatf-VII	Babur	GLCM; SLCM	2011; 2018	Army Strategic Forces Command; Naval Strategic Forces Command	Pakistan Army; Pakistan Navy
Hatf-VIII	Ra'ad	ALCM	2012	Air Force Strategic Forces Command	Pakistan Air Force
Hatf-IX	Nasr	SRBM	2011	Army Strategic Forces Command	Pakistan Army

=== Tactical missile development ===
The Hatf-I (English tr.: "Target") was the first project developed under this programme in 1987. Deployed by the Pakistan Army, the Hatf-I is a short-ranged ballistic missile system developed by SUPARCO. The system was seen as direct competition with India's Prithvi system.

Despite claims of success by the Pakistani administration, the Pakistani military admitted that the missile system's inaccuracy led to the programme's shelving until 2000 when it finally entered military service. Western assessments believed this system to be influenced directly by American and French space rockets studied by SUPARCO as part of its original civilian space programme.

Lessons and experiences gained from the Hatf-I eventually led to the design and development of the Nasr in 2011, which is widely believed to be a delivery system for small tactical nuclear weapons. The short-ranged system is exclusively designed and deployed for the Pakistan Army.

=== Short–medium range development ===
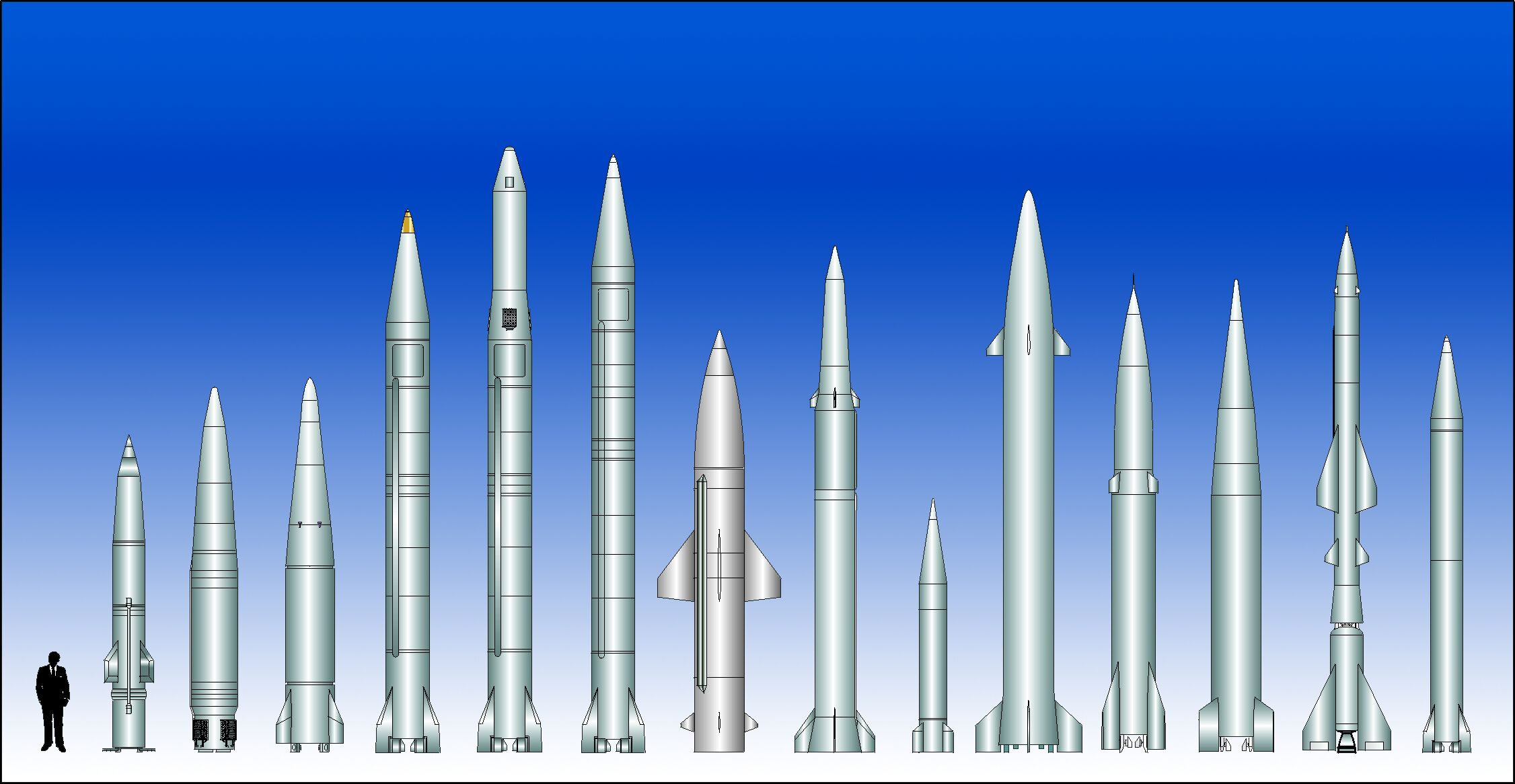
Comparison by MDA of India and Pakistan's short-range systems.

The Zia administration acquired Soviet Scud technology from the former Afghan National Army, but it provided little benefit to the country's scientists in understanding short-range missile systems. In 1993, the Benazir Bhutto government began secretly procuring the DF-11 from China. While the Chinese short-range missile was not nuclear weapons delivery capable, attempts to reverse engineer its delivery mechanism failed.

In 1995, Pakistan initiated a programme to develop short-range missiles based on a solid fuel platform, with China providing technological assistance and education in aerospace and controls engineering. To address the deployment limitations of the M-11, the Abdali programme was designed and implemented by the SUPARCO in 1995, while the Ghaznavi programme was delegated to the National Defence Complex, deriving from M-11 designs. The Ghaznavi's rocket engine, tested in 1997, was a significant breakthrough.

During this time, the Shaheen programme was pursued and developed by the National Defence Complex (NDC). Despite facing technological setbacks the Shaheen programme continued to evolve, producing its first prototype in 1999. The programme proved sustainable, producing improved variants. The Ababeel was developed with MIRV capability to counter India's missile defence.

The Hatf programme diversified into liquid-fuel technology, with KRL as its lead. The technology for this programme came directly from North Korea, with support from the Benazir Bhutto administration. Pakistani military admissions confirm that the Finance ministry under Benazir Bhutto paid significant amounts of cash to North Korea to facilitate the transfer of North Korean scientists to Pakistani universities for teaching aerospace engineering. Originally based entirely on the Rodong-1, the Ghauri programme, designed under the guidance of North Korean engineers, took its first flight in 1998 but failed due to engine failure and a flawed design.

After the first flight failure in 1998, North Korean engineers were removed from the programme, forcing KRL to work on reverse engineering and redesign the entire weapon system. With assistance from the DESTO and NDC, the first missile, Ghauri-I, was made for deployment in 2004.

=== Cruise missile technology ===
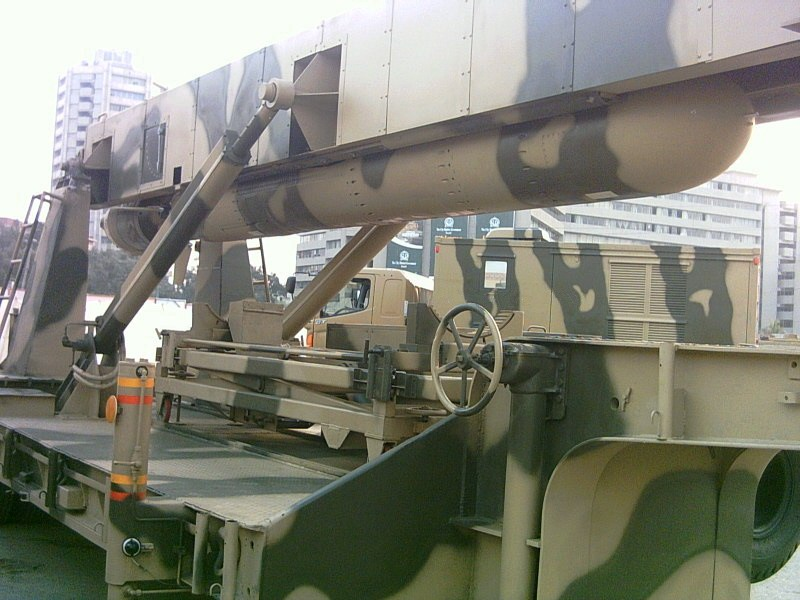
The Babur in Pakistani military markings being showcased in Karachi in 2006.

Development on understanding and developing cruise missile technology began in Pakistan when India initiated its missile defence programme in 1998. Amidst the tense environment between the Sharif administration, Vajpayee premiership and Clinton administration, Pakistan's development of cruise missiles was spurred by India's acquisition of the S-300 Grumble from Russia and its attempts to negotiate with the United States for the Patriot PAC-3. These developments negatively impacted Pakistan's land-based deterrence mechanism.

It took Pakistan several years to make its cruise missile programme feasible. In 2005, the first Babur (Pakistani military designation: Hatf-VII) was successfully test-fired by the army, surprising the United States. In 2007, Pakistan announced the development and test-firing of Ra'ad (Pakistani military designation: Hatf-VIII), demonstrating its air-launched cruise missile capability.

In 2017, Pakistan conducted a successful launch of the Babur-III missile from an underwater mobile platform. This long-desired capability for the Navy effectively established Pakistan's second-strike capability from sea.

== See also ==
- List of missiles of Pakistan
- Khan Research Laboratories
