= Ghaznavi (missile) =

Pakistani short-range ballistic missile

Hatf-III Ghaznavi
- Type: SRBM
- Place of origin: Pakistan

Service history
- In service: 2004–Present
- Used by: Pakistan Army: Army Strategic Forces Command

Production history
- Designer: National Defence Complex
- Designed: 1994–98
- Manufacturer: National Defence Complex
- No. built: 30 (2017 est.)

Specifications (Technical data)
- Mass: 4,650 kg (10,250 lb)
- Length: 8.5 m (330 in)
- Diameter: 0.8 m (31 in)
- Maximum firing range: 300 km (190 mi)
- Warhead: HE/NE
- Warhead weight: 700 kg (1,500 lb)
- Blast yield: 12 kilotons of TNT (50 TJ)—20 kilotons of TNT (84 TJ)
- Engine: Single-stage
- Transmission: Automatic
- Suspension: WS2400 8WD (With Pakistani military markings)
- Propellant: Solid-propellant
- Operational range: 290 km (180 mi)–300 km (190 mi)
- Guidance system: Inertial, Terminal
- Accuracy: 50 m (160 ft) CEP
- Launch platform: Transporter erector launcher (TEL)

The Ghaznavi (Urdu: غزنوی; Military designation: Hatf–III, Trans.: Target-3) is a land-based short range ballistic missile, currently in military service with the strategic command of the Pakistan Army.

Designed and developed in secrecy by the National Development Complex, it is codenamed after Ghaznavi (a Turkic leader who conquered parts of India) with its military deployment designation as Hatf-III. It has been deployed in active duty with Pakistan Army since 2012.

== Development ==
In 1993, Benazir Bhutto's ministry procured the M-11 missile from China but the Chinese missiles were incapable of addressing Pakistan's nuclear deterrence capability against India in an event of conventional standoff. Any attempts to circumvent the Chinese missiles had failed the missile system entirely that forced the MoD to eventually design and develop its own program.

Codenamed as Ghaznavi, after the Turkic sultan Mahmud of Ghazni, the contract was awarded to National Defence Complex which designed the rocket system and the warhead as well. The program was pursued along with the Abdali program that was being led by SUPARCO. The JS HQ, however, officially deployed this system as "Hatf–III" (lit. Target-3).

In 1995, its rocket engine was successfully tested and was said to be a "major break-through in rocket development in Pakistan".

Due to its engineering feat, the Western observers had leveled serious allegations of foreign assistance, comparing to former Soviet Scud or Chinese M-11 missiles. However, the Pakistani military and civil officials strongly refuted and dismissed the suggestions by quoting that the program was locally designed and indigenously built.

=== Operational deployment ===
After years of expensive trials and errors that started in 1994, Ghaznavi finally took its first spaceflight on 26 May 2002, during the height of the military standoff with India. The Ghaznavi is a nuclear weapon-delivery capability weapon system that drew World's attention during the tense atmosphere in 2002.

On 3 October 2003, the Ghaznavi was again successfully test fired from an undisclosed location, which was described by the military as "highly successful". The Ghaznavi successfully reached its target and has a range of 290 kilometres (180 mi), making it capable of striking several key targets within neighboring, India. The Ghaznavi entered in the military service with the strategic command of Pakistan Army in March 2004. Successive testing continued prior to its actual military deployment with different control system; its third test launched took place on 8 December 2004.

Subsequent tests were conducted on 9 December 2006 another on 13 February 2008 and 8 May 2010; the 2008 test was believed to have concluded a winter training exercise of Pakistan's strategic command of Pakistan Army. In May 2012, one more successful test of the missile was conducted as part of a training exercise. Pakistan successfully carried out night training launch of Ghaznavi missile on August 28, 2019.

The Ghaznavi is transported through the WS2400 8WD TEL on which Pakistani military markings are quite visible.
