= Asia-Pacific Space Cooperation Organization =

Collaborative space technology program

Member States of the Asia-Pacific Space Cooperation Organization

The Asia-Pacific Space Cooperation Organization (APSCO) is an inter-governmental organization operated as a non-profit independent body with full international legal status. It is headquartered in Beijing, People's Republic of China. Members include agencies from: Bangladesh, China, Iran, Mongolia, Pakistan, Peru, Thailand and Turkey. In 2005, the APSCO convention was signed in Beijing. Representatives from Argentina, Malaysia, the Philippines, Russia and Sri Lanka also attended the founding ceremony. The organization's convention acknowledges the high technical and financial resources required for space exploration, making it advantageous to pool resources among countries in the Asia-Pacific region.

== Objectives ==
Its stated objectives include:

1. To promote and strengthen the development of collaborative space programs among its Member States by establishing the basis for cooperation in peaceful applications of space science and technology.
2. To take effective actions to assist the Member States in such areas as space technological research and development, applications and training by elaborating and implementing space development policies.
3. To promote cooperation, joint development, and to share achievements among the Member States in space technology and its applications as well as in space science research by tapping the cooperative potential of the region.
4. To enhance cooperation among relevant enterprises and institutions of the Member States and to promote the industrialization of space technology and its applications.
5. To contribute to the peaceful uses of outer space in the international cooperative activities in space technology and its applications.

As of 2010, the organization defined ten projects on designing, building and launching light satellites, middle class satellites weighing 500–600 kg, research satellites, remote-sensing and telecommunications satellites.

== Members ==
Countries as full APSCO members

As of October 2024, APSCO has eight countries as full members.

- Bangladesh
- China
- Iran
- Mongolia
- Pakistan
- Peru
- Thailand
- Turkey

== See also ==
- List of government space agencies
