= Abdul Majid (physicist) =

Pakistani physicist (born 1941)

- Born: 1 May 1941 (age 85); Narowal, Punjab, British Indian Empire
- Education: University of Wales, United Kingdom
- Known for: Satellite technology and rocket/range instrumentation
- Awards: Sitara-i-Imtiaz (1999)
- Scientific career
- Fields: Astrophysics and space physics
- Workplaces: Space and Upper Atmosphere Research Commission (SUPARCO)
- Doctoral advisor: Phil JSWilliams

For other people with the same or similar name, see Abdul Majid

Abdul Majid (Urdu):(عبد الماجد) is a Pakistani astrophysicist and scientist in the field of space technology. He served as a former chairman of Space and Upper Atmosphere Research Commission from 1997 to 2001. He made significant contributions to Pakistan's space program. During his tenure as SUPARCO administrator, Pakistan launched two satellites in Low Earth orbit (LEO).

== Education ==
Abdul Majid was born in Narowal, Pakistan from where he received his elementary and high school education. He received BSc (hons) and MSc in Nuclear Physics from Government College, Punjab University in 1962 and was awarded the Roll of Honours. His thesis on 'Radiative Capture of Neutrons' was rated as one of the best ever submitted for a master's degree by Rafi M. Chaudhary. Under NASA fellowship program he studied Astrogeophysics at Colorado University, Boulder, Colorado. For his PhD he worked on Radio interferometric detection of Gravity Waves under Sir Granville Jones/P.J.S. Williams at the University of Wales, Aberystwyth, UK. The project involved fabrication of phase switched receivers as an integral constituent of widely spaced radio interferometers. The system detected gravity waves as travelling ionospheric disturbances.

== SUPARCO career ==
After his PhD, he came back to Pakistan and joined Pakistan's Space Program as a researcher in astrophysics and aeronautical labs. Majid worked under the supervision of noted Pakistani-Polish military scientist and aeronautical engineer, Air Commodore W. J. M. Turowicz, in the field of Rocket Technology and published numerous research papers. He is credited for the design and developed the Hypersonic Rocket Launch Vehicle or Hatf Missiles Series during his stay at SUPARCO. In 1983, Majid was put in-charge of Satellite Development Program of Pakistan. He is widely credited for the indigenous development and launching of BADR-1 and development of Badr-B Earth Observation Satellites. He was keen to develop Pakistan's Space Launch capabilities and met with both former Prime Minister of Pakistan, Nawaz Sharif and Benazir Bhutto to gain their approval for the project. The project however was not sanctioned due to economic constrains.
