= Lunar prediction programme (SUPARCO) =

Scientific mission of SUPARCO

A geometric representation of a lunar eclipse

The lunar prediction programme (or SUPARCO New Moon prediction programme) is an active scientific mission of the SUPARCO, Pakistan's national space agency, aimed to conduct studies and predict the appearances and phases of the Moon. On a regular basis, SUPARCO provides illustrative predictions for the visibility and the parameters for the sighting of the full new Moon in the various cities of Pakistan.

The program's data and media representation is also cohesively shared with the chairman of the Ruet-e-Hilal Committee of the Ministry of Religious Affairs (MoRA). SUPARCO processes the lunar data for the various cities of Pakistan and is responsible for the studies for the visibility of New Moon. The schedule data and timing is provided by the SUPARCO to all cities of Pakistan, as common public domain, and distribute its publications through the media to inform the nation about the phases of the moon. The final jurisdiction on moon appearances for important holidays and festivals (such as Chand Raat), is announced by the chairman of the Ruet-e-Hilal Committee of the MoRA after generalizing and analyzing the scientific data of SUPARCO that it had received from its astronomical laboratories.

== Scientific studies and research ==
SUPARCO carries out major academic research in lunar theory and conducts scientific studies on the astronomical appearances and mathematical motion of the Moon and the binary stars in the Milky Way region under this program. SUPARCO's studies concentrate on bettering understanding of lunar theory, lunar eclipses, and research involving a comprehensive understanding of the orbit of the Moon. Though the program's main goal is to assist the ministry of religious affairs for moon sighting to declare the religious holidays, observances, and festivals based on the lunar calendar, the program opportunity invited the IST to conduct research on Kepler's laws of planetary motion, Kepler orbits and orbital perturbations.

The major activities of predicting the phases of moon take place in the Pakistan Naval Observatory, Department of Mathematics of the Karachi University and the Institute of Space and Planetary Astrophysics (ISPA), where the institutes provide scientific background of the motion of lunar phases and appearances to the ministry of religious affairs.

== Religious influence and reception in the public circles ==
The Central Ruet-e-Hilal Committee (Ruet-e-Hilal Committee) has a strong religious influence in the program, concerning the matter of moon sighting for the observances of religious holidays. The Ruet-e-Hilal Committee, headed by its government appointed chairman, is assisted by the officials of Pakistan Meteorological Department, SUPARCO and the active-duty naval personnel of the Pakistan Navy. The chairman of the Ruet-e-Hilal Committee presided the final meeting and has final arbiter and jurisdiction on announcing the official moonsighting and the observances of the religious holidays.

The influence of ministry of religious in the programme has been vigorously criticized by the electronic media of the country, as media marking the programme as "pure scientific". However, the ministry of religious dismissed all claims and criticism as one official stated, "no need for help from the science in sighting the moon, as it was a "religious matter." For each semester and for six months, SUPARCO issues the lunar-based Islamic calendar and the new moon visibility prediction through internet, media and as the public domain documents.
