= Hatf-I =

Pakistani tactical ballistic missile

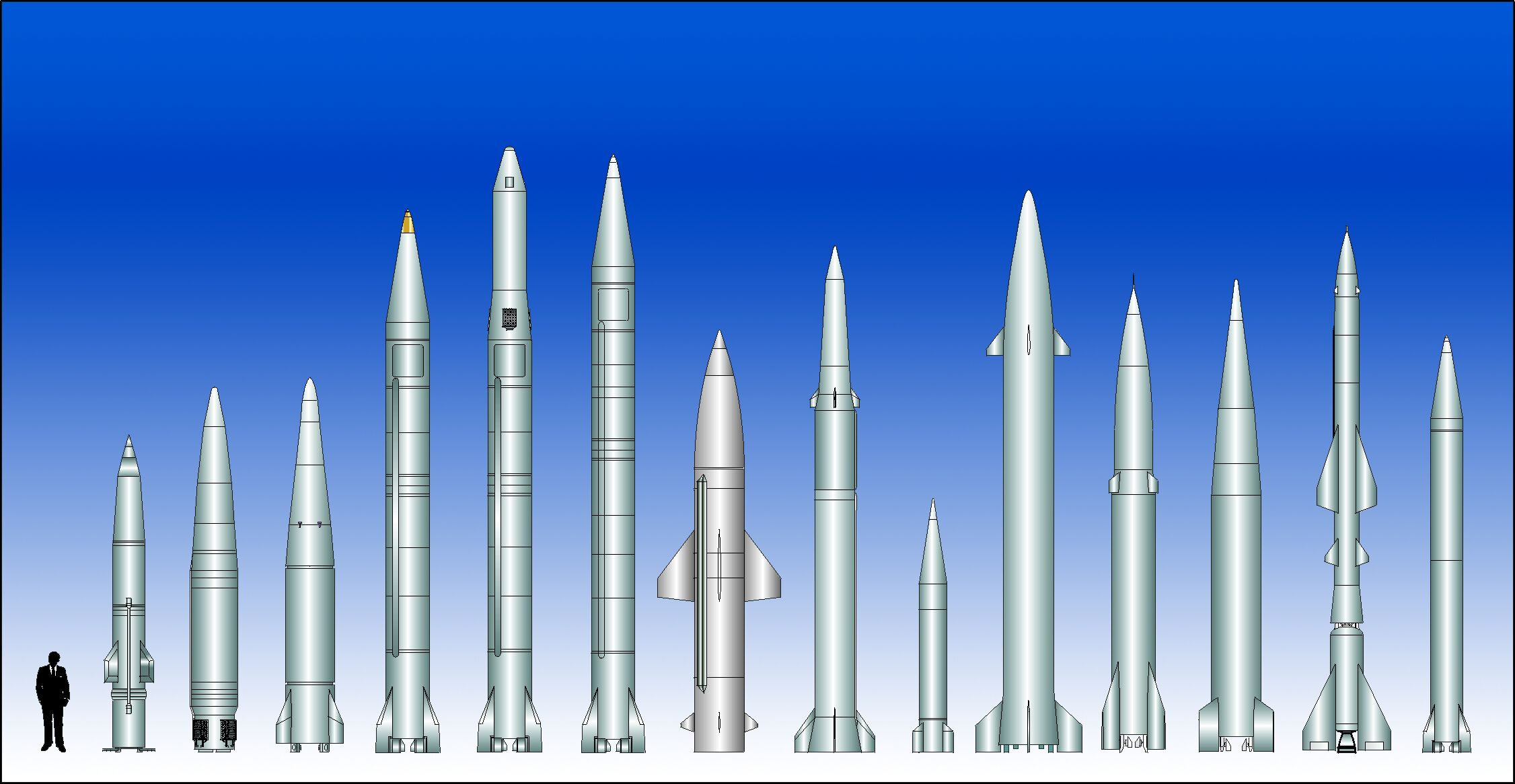
- The Hatf-I (shown in 6th, from right to left) by US MDA.
- Type: Short-range ballistic missile
- Place of origin: Pakistan

Service history
- In service: 1992–Present
- Used by: Pakistan Army: Air Defense Corps (1992–99); Air Defense Command (1999-2000); Army Strategic Forces Command (2000–Present)

Production history
- Designer: Space Research Commission (Rocket system); Kahuta Research Laboratories (Warhead design/assembly)
- Designed: 1987–89
- Manufacturer: Space Research Commission
- Produced: 1987–2001
- No. built: 105 (stock estimated in 2021))
- Variants: Hatf-I: 1992; Hatf-IA: 1995; Hatf-IB: 2001

Specifications (Technical data)
- Mass: 500 kg (1,100 lb)
- Length: 6.0 m (19.7 ft)
- Diameter: 0.56 m (22 in)
- Maximum firing range: 100 km (62 mi)
- Warhead: Conventional HE/CE
- Warhead weight: 500 kg (1,100 lb)
- Engine: Single-stage
- Payload capacity: 500 kg (1,100 lb)
- Transmission: Manual
- Suspension: M35/Isuzu x 4WD semi-trailer
- Propellant: Solid-propellant
- Operational range: Hatf-I: 70 km (43 mi); Hatf-IA/IB: 100 km (62 mi)
- Maximum speed: 5.9–6.1 m/s (19–20 ft/s)
- Guidance system: Unguided:Hatf-I/IA; Inertial: Hatf-IB
- Accuracy: 100 m (330 ft) CEP
- Launch platform: Transporter erector launcher

The Hatf I (Urdu: حتف; Military designation: Hatf–I, Translit. Target-1) is a land-based short-ranged ballistic missile, currently in service with the strategic command of the Pakistan Army.

Jointly designed and developed by the Space Research Commission and the Kahuta Research Laboratories (KRL) in 1987, it is the first system developed under Hatf program (lit. Target) and entered military service with Pakistan Army in 1992.

The Hatf-I is deployed as rocket artillery weapon system and has been replaced by the improved Hatf-IA and Hatf-IB, which have a maximum range of 100 kilometres (62 mi).

== Development and design ==
With the revelation of India's missile program, General Mirza Beg, then-chief of army staff working under President Zia-ul-Haq, launched a Hatf (lit. Target) program to meet India's challenge. The Hatf-I was developed in response and attempt to counter India's Prithvi and the program was first delegated to Space Research Commission. Designing of Hatf rocket system began in 1987 with Khan Research Laboratories joining the project and took initiatives to design warheads. The Hatf-I was developed in haste to address India's challenge and led to allegations by the Western observation that the missile was derived from French and American designs. The Hatf mission was to be use as an unguided general bombardment weapon, to be fired across a battlefield or at a general target area. If properly aimed, it can hit within several hundred meters of the target area. On a Pakistan Day Parade, the weapon system was officially revealed by the Pakistani military in 1989 and it is believed to have entered service in 1992.

The Hatf I has a range of approximately 70 km (43 mi) and can carry a 500 kg conventional or non-conventional warhead. As it is unguided, it should be considered a long-range artillery shell, with the location of the impact depending upon the proper direction, angle of launch and the ability of the missile to fly straight. The Hatf-I is deployed with high explosive or cluster munitions, although it can theoretically carry a tactical nuclear weapon. The missile has a diameter of 0.56 m and is 6 m in length. It uses a single-stage solid propellant rocket motor.

The Hatf IA and Hatf IB are upgraded versions with improved range and accuracy. The Hatf IA increased maximum range to 100 km by using an improved rocket motor and lighter materials in the missile's construction. The dimensions and the payload capacity remain the same. Hatf-IA is believed to have entered service in 1995.

The Hatf IB represents the final evolution of the Hatf I missile system. It includes an inertial guidance system that considerably improves the accuracy of the missile and is otherwise identical to the Hatf IA, retaining the maximum range of 100 km and payload of 500 kg. The inertial guidance system allows the missile to be used as an artillery rocket against enemy military encampments or storage depots etc. The missile system is designed to be used like an artillery system, with 5–6 missiles fired simultaneously at the target area. Being a ballistic missile the Hatf-IB would reach its target much quicker than an ordinary artillery shell giving the target little warning to take evasive action.

Hatf-IB was first flight tested in February 2000. All current Hatf-I missiles have been upgraded to Hatf-IB standard as of 2001. The system is operational with Pakistan's armed forces. Besides Ghauri, the Hatf-I is the only weapon system that is transported on a semitrailer.

== Variants ==
- Hatf I — Maximum range: 70 km (43 mi) Payload: 500 kg (1,100 lb), unguided.
- Hatf IA — Maximum range: 100 km (62 mi) Payload: 500 kg (1,100 lb), unguided.
- Hatf IB — Maximum range: 100 km (62 mi) Payload: 500 kg (1,100 lb), inertial guidance.

== See also ==
- Pakistani missile research and development program
- Abdali-I
- Ghaznavi (missile)
- Nasr (missile)
