= Paksat-MM1R =

Pakistani communications satellite

- Mission type: Communications
- Operator: SUPARCO
- Mission duration: 15 years (planned)

Spacecraft properties
- Spacecraft: Paksat-MM1R
- Spacecraft type: Communication satellite
- Manufacturer: China Aerospace Science and Technology Corporation

Start of mission
- Launch date: 30 May 2024, 12:12 UTC
- Rocket: Long March 3B
- Launch site: Xichang Satellite Launch Centre, China
- Entered service: 18 September 2024

Transponders
- Band: C, Ku, Ka and L Bands

The Paksat-MM1R is a Pakistani communication satellite, which was launched on 30 May 2024. This mission was a joint effort of the Space and Upper Atmosphere Research Commission (SUPARCO) and the China Aerospace Science and Technology Corporation. The satellite was launched from China's Xichang Satellite Launch Centre. On 18 September 2024, Minister of State for Information Technology and Telecommunication Shaza Fatima Khawaja announced that the satellite had successfully completed testing and had become operational.

== Naming ==
Before launch, the satellite was designated PakSAT-MM 1R, but at launch it was referred to as PakSAT-MM 1.

The satellite was launched on a LM-3B launch vehicle, which was the 96th launch of the LM-3B launch vehicle and the 524th launch of the Long March family.

== Details ==
The satellite was developed by China Academy of Space Technology (CAST), a subsidiary of CASC. It is based on the DFH-4E satellite platform with a liftoff mass of 5,400 kg, and equipped with 9 antennas and 48 transponders in C, Ku, Ka, and L bands. It can provide various services such as broadcasting, regional enhanced communications, high-throughput broadband and the satellite-based augmentation system (SBAS) services etc. The satellite will be positioned at 38.2° E orbit slot, covering the mainland and surrounding areas of Pakistan, parts of the Indian Ocean, the Middle East, East Africa, and parts of Europe, with a service life of 15 years.

The total deliverable capacity of Ka-Band is 10 Gbit/s covering the whole of Pakistan. There is no steerable beam in Ka-HTS payload. Maximum throughput achievable on a single beam is approx. 1 Gbit/s. User beams are fixed and cannot be steered over any particular area. For PakSat-MM1 HTS, three Gateway beams have been designed over Lahore, Karachi and Islamabad with gateway beam of 0.08°. It is recommended to install two gateways (one primary and other as back up). However, PakSat-MM1 HTS has been designed in such a way that one GW can handle all the traffic of 11 user beams.
