= Space Operations Center (Brazil) =

Brazilian space operations center

- Centro de Operações Espaciais
- Brasília, DF in Brazil
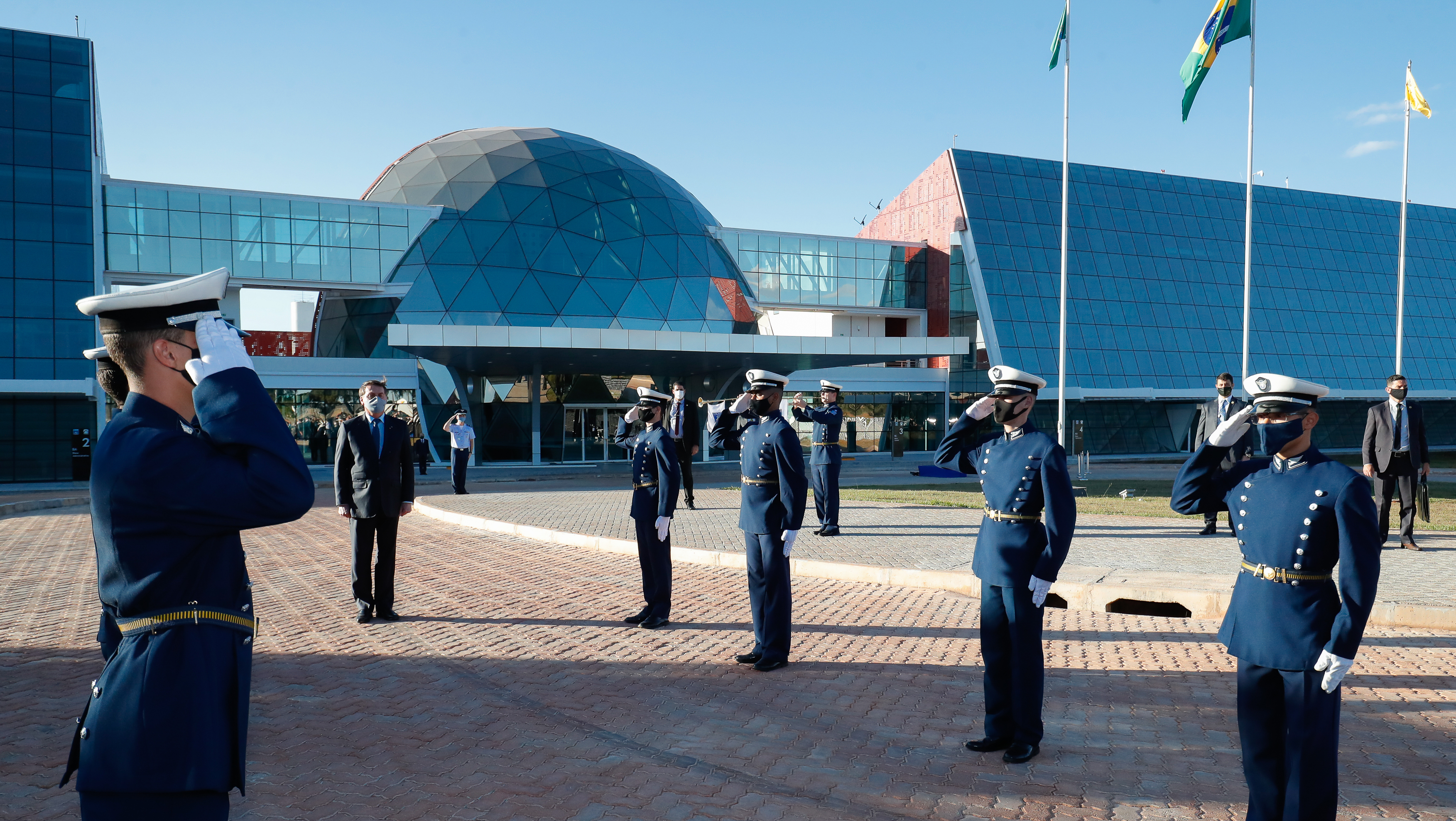
- COPE in 2020

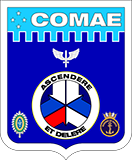

Site information
- Type: Space control center
- Owner: Aerospace Operations Command
- Controlled by: Brazilian Air Force
- Open to the public: No

Site history
- In use: 2020-present

The Space Operations Center (Portuguese: Centro de Operações Espaciais - COPE) is a facility in Brasília operated by the Aerospace Operations Command to control and oversee the Brazilian satellites and other space activities. COMAE and its subordinate COPE facility is a permanent Brazilian armed forces joint command that includes both Army and Navy personnel. The center supports a geosynchronous communications satellite and two imaging satellites in low earth orbit.

== History and mission ==
The COPE was inaugurated on 23 June 2020 by President Jair Bolsonaro. The main mission of the facility is the operation and control the SGDCs satellites in partnership with Telebras. Other space activities will be conducted from the COPE as part of the Brazilian Space Agency operations.

In 2023, Brazil space advocates began developing proposals for installation of a space collision monitoring and analysis center to support Brazil's space autonomy.

In April 2024, the commanders of U.S.Space Command and the Brazil Space Operations Center signed a memorandum of agreement to assign a liaison officer to USSPACECOM to provide Brazilian armed forces expertise and further USSPACECOM-Brazil cooperation in the military space arena.
