= Ishrat Hussain Usmani =

Pakistani nuclear physicist (1917–1992)

- Dr. I. H. Usmani (1917–92)
- Born: 15 April 1917; Delhi, India (Present day New Delhi, India)
- Died: 17 June 1992 (aged 75); Karachi, Pakistan
- Education: Aligarh Muslim University; Bombay University; London University
- Known for: Nuclear arms control
- Awards: Nishan-i-Imtiaz (1998)
- Scientific career
- Fields: Atomic physics
- Workplaces: Pakistan Atomic Energy Commission (PAEC); International Atomic Energy Agency (IAEA)
- Thesis: A study of the growth of compound crystals by electron diffraction (1939)
- Doctoral advisor: Niels Bohr
- Other academic advisors: George Paget Thomson

Ishrat Hussain Usmani (Urdu: عشرت حسین عثمانی) (15 April 1917 – 17 June 1992) NI, best known as I. H. Usmani, was a Pakistani atomic physicist, and later a public official who chaired the Pakistan Atomic Energy Commission (PAEC) from 1960 to 1971 as well as overseeing the establishment of the Space Research Commission.

His career was mostly spent in the Government of Pakistan as a public policy official where he pushed for peaceful and commercial usage of the nuclear energy, and later worked on arms control with Ministry of Defense to become a party of Partial Nuclear Test Ban Treaty in 1963 before joining the International Atomic Energy Agency (IAEA) as the Chair of its Board of Governors. Usmani oversaw the nuclear power generation in Pakistan, working towards commissioning the nuclear power grid station in Karachi, and strengthened the role of the atomic energy commission at the United Nations.

== Biography ==
Ishrat Hussain Usmani was born in Delhi in India on 15 April 1917. Usmani hailed from an educated, cultured, and gentry class, having completed his schooling in Aligarh. Usmani attended the St. Xavier's College in Bombay, and graduated with BSc with honors in physics from the Bombay University in 1936. His graduation from the Bombay University was noted in the local Indian press for being the first in the Presidency's Physics and Mathematics Group. Usmani continued his education in physics and went to attend the Aligarh Muslim University (AMU) where he attained his MSc in physics. Usmani went to the United Kingdom to attend the doctoral program in physics at the Imperial College in London, to work under George Paget Thomson on electron diffraction. At Imperial College, Usmani qualified for Diploma of Imperial College (DIC).

Usmani later joined Niels Bohr at the London University to continue his investigation on the electron diffraction through crystallization, and submitted his thesis under the supervision of Dr. Bohr, titled: "A study of the growth of compound crystals by electron diffraction" in 1939. His early work and investigation was based on the crystallization, lattice arrangement, and atomic properties of Uranium.

In 1941, Usmani was conferred with PhD in atomic physics, just aged 23, and subsequently returned to India in 1942, where he qualified for the examination for the Indian Civil Service (ICS). Rather than seeking teaching career in physics at the Indian universities, Usmani joined the Indian Civil Service in a view of seeking an employment opportunity with the Indian government, and served as an ICS officer in Madras Presidency from 1942 to 1947.

== Career in Government of Pakistan ==
=== Pakistan Atomic Energy Commission ===
After the partition of India in 1947 by the United Kingdom, Usmani, who had decided to never teach physics at the university, chose to continue his public service with the Government of Pakistan, serving in various federal agencies including his role as Chief Controller of Imports and Exports with the Ministry of Finance. He built up his prestige in the federal government and was noted by President Ayub Khan for his doctorate in physics who could advise the federal government on scientific matters, especially ways of electricity generation in Pakistan besides hydroelectricity.

In 1959, Zulfikar Ali Bhutto, then-Minister of Energy in the Ayub administration, lobbied to appoint Usmani to the corporate administration of the Pakistan Atomic Energy Commission that was being chaired by Dr. Nazir Ahmed, and eventually took its chairmanship in 1960. Under his chairmanship, Usmani engaged the PAEC towards the peaceful usage of nuclear energy for greater industrial output, and supported the American initiatives for Atoms for Peace. Usmani launched the PAEC scholarship program that selected 50 of the brightest students in physical science, mathematics, and engineering to pursue higher education in the United States, namely attending the University of North Carolina, Massachusetts Institute of Technology, Pennsylvania State University, and the University of Michigan. Funding of the students was not restricted to study in United States but also in United Kingdom and Canada. In addition, Usmani placed a request to his American friends, Dr. Alvin Martin Weinberg and Dr. Robert Charpi, to allow Pakistan's foreign exchange students to carry out their research at Oak Ridge National Laboratory (ORNL) and Argonne National Laboratory (ANL), asking them to arrange an on-the-job training program at their sites.

In 1961, Usmani commissioned the American firms, the Gibbs and Hill and Internuclear Company, to conduct feasibility and standard study for the establishment of nuclear power plants, whose recommendations became the standard for the PAEC's construction of nuclear power industry in the country. Usmani also provided his support to Planning Commission and Geological Survey (GSP) to independently conduct surveys for the construction of the power plant, and engaged in negotiation with the International Atomic Energy Agency (IAEA) for financial and further support for the power plant to be constructed in Karachi, known as the Karachi Nuclear Power Plant (KANUPP). In 1967, Usmani played a pivotal role in securing the federal funding for establishing the Institute of Nuclear Science and Technology near Islamabad– a visionary national laboratory site functioning under Dr. Abdus Salam, a theoretical physicist. He helped negotiate the establishment of the Institute by speaking with the American architect, Edward Durrell Stone, and oversaw the final construction of the Institute of Nuclear Science and Technology by 1967–68.

Usmani also took great interest in space exploration by helping Dr. Abdus Salam establishing the Space Research Commission in 1961, serving as its deputy director, and sought NASA's helped in his nation's first rocket launching program.

=== War with India and arms control ===
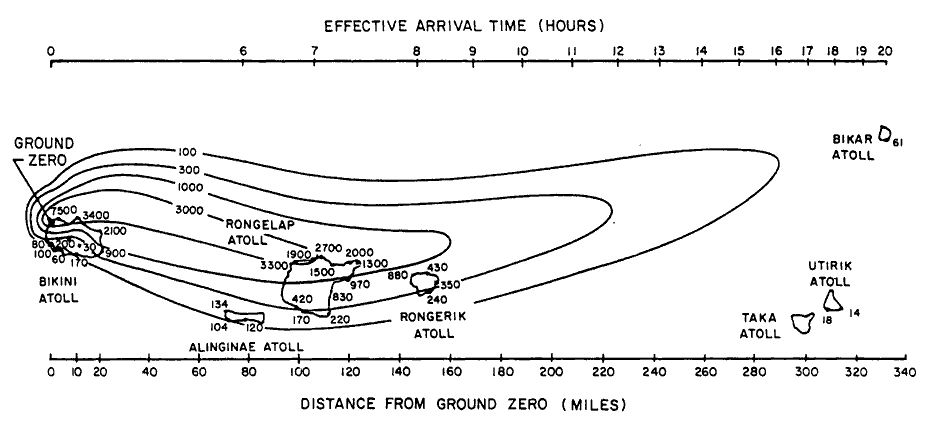
A time-scale contour curves shows the fallout from the Castle Bravo. Usmani deemed the American nuclear testing as ineffective and insignificant, and was proponent for arms control and defense spending in order to invest in education.

Usmani was well known for his support for the anti-nuclear weapons movement, and saw the American 'Project Plowshare' tests for using nuclear bombs to create artificial lakes as ineffective and insignificant. In 1967–70, he worked with the Ministry of Defense on nuclear arms control by advising the Yahya administration. At one point, Usmani refused to allow a team of Pakistani scientists to participate in the American testing because he believed, "Pakistan would not be benefitted at all due to the technology Pakistanis at that time were unfamiliar with it. In 1964, he deplored the People's Republic of China's first nuclear test, 'Project 596', but congratulated the Chinese scientists for their achievement while cautiously stressing for the Chinese to focus towards increasing living standards and their gross national product (GNP) rather than conducting atomic tests.

He also rebuffed Homi J. Bhabha's claim of India following the American nuclear tests, and viewed negatively India's claims of their first test, 'Smiling Buddha' being a "peaceful" atomic test in 1974. In 1971, there was a serious diplomatic incident when PAEC's Dhaka Center complained of the air quality when it detected nuclear particles that originated from China, Usmani reportedly shared the data with Americans when the Pakistan Air Forces' (PAF) Boeing WC-135 Constant Phoenix was flown on a secretive air sampling mission over China— this matter was quietly closed between China and Pakistan.

By 1971, PAEC had become a world leading nuclear organization and focused their role towards the advancement of science and technology while developing the nuclear power generation program,accompanying the officials at the commissioning services of the KANUPP-I– Pakistan's first nuclear power plant. As Chairman of the PAEC, Usmani tried advising for nuclear arms control to the Bhutto administration by keeping their nuclear capability as discreet as possible to prevent unwanted international attention. Usmani was widely notorious at PAEC for disrupting research on nuclear materials by transferring scientists to non-technical and corporate positions. Usmani also strongly objected and vocally disagreed with the appointment of Dr. Mubashir Hassan, an engineer with doctorate in civil engineering, as Finance Minister who was looking after the PAEC's operational scope.

On 20 January 1972, President Zulfikar Ali Bhutto relieved Usmani from the Chairmanship by appointing Munir Ahmad Khan, a reactor physicist, in his place. Usmani was dispatched to the Ministry of Science and Technology as its Secretary, remaining involved with the PAEC's matter, and continued lobbying for arms control. This appointment remained short when he was fired from the position and dispatched to the Ministry of Education.

== United Nations ==
=== International Atomic Energy Agency ===
In 1974, Usmani was reassigned in the Bhutto administration when he was appointed as the Education Secretary at the Ministry of Education. He retired from the public service in 1976. He accepted a position at the UN Environment Program, and relocated to New York City in the United States. He advised on solar radiation management until 1978 when he left to join the International Atomic Energy Agency (IAEA).

In 1978, Mohammad Rezā Pahlavi, the Shah of Iran, contacted Usmani to advise the Iranian nuclear program, asking him for scientific recommendations to establish the Bushehr Nuclear Power Plant but he never visited Iran due to the Iranian Revolution.

Even at the IAEA, he remained concerned about nuclear proliferation and called for arms control when he published an article Nucleonics Week in 1981, in which he claimed that Pakistan's atomic bomb program has been a failure and is unlikely ever to be capable of producing even the crudest of nuclear devices— therefore the program is near collapse. Although, Usmani was notified and knew well that the atomic bomb project was a complete success, the program has gone mature, and the critical phase of producing the fissile cores had been achieved since 1978. His publication played an influential role in convincing the United States' policy to ease off the nuclear embargo on Pakistan.

He remained with the IAEA until 1985 when he joined the Bank of Credit and Commerce International (BCCI) to oversee the funding and construction of the University of Computer and Emerging Sciences and the Ghulam Ishaq Khan Institute of Technology. He remained associated with the BCCI until 1991 when he retired and returned to Pakistan after 17 years. While in Pakistan, Usmani became a consultant of the New and Emerging Sciences and Technology (NEST) a scientific think tank based in Pakistan.

== Death and legacy ==
Usmani returned to Pakistan in 1991 where he bought an estate in Karachi, Sindh, and died on 17 June 1992. In his country, Usmanis' advocacy for nuclear arms control and civil use of nuclear power remains popular.

During his public service, Usmani successfully presented the idea of Scientific Services, where scientists could seek promising career and permanent employment with the federal government, which many of his peers and scientists did. In May 1998, Usmani was posthumously recognized for his services when he was conferred with his nation's highest honor, the Nishan-i-Imtiaz.

== See also ==
- International Atomic Energy Agency
