= Pakistan Software Export Board =

- Founded: 1995; 31 years ago
- Type: Guarantee Limited
- Purpose: Information technology promotion
- Location: Islamabad, Pakistan
- Parent organization: Government of Pakistan
- Website: techdestination.com

Pakistan Software Export Board (PSEB) (Urdu: پاکستان سوفٹ ویئر برآمدات بورڈ) is a government-owned, guarantee limited company, founded in 1995, primarily to promote the information technology industry of Pakistan.

PSEB is an apex government body mandated to promote Pakistan's IT Industry in local and international markets. PSEB facilitates the IT industry through a series of projects and programs in infrastructure development, human capital development, company capability development, global marketing, strategy and research, and the promotion of innovation and technologies.

Government incentives to the international outsourcing community include 100% equity ownership, 100% repatriation of capital and dividends, and income tax credit for IT export until June 2025. Pakistan has a large talent pool of English-speaking, cost-competitive and skilled workforce, a large number of internationally-certified companies and a reliable telecom infrastructure. PSEB works extensively with international trade associations, commerce bodies and the media to promote Pakistan's IT industry. PSEB has more than 17,000 active IT/ITeS companies, which possess expertise in custom software development, enterprise resource planning, financial solutions, mobile content, document management, enterprise computing and business process outsourcing.
