= SUPARCO Satellite Ground Station =

Satellite Ground Station of SUPARCO

- سیٹلائٹ زمینی اسٹیشن

Agency overview
- Formed: Unknown
- Jurisdiction: Pakistan federal government
- Headquarters: Rawat, Islamabad-45900, Pakistan
- Annual budget: See the budget of SUPARCO
- Parent agency: SUPARCO
- Website: SUPARCO SGS home page

The SUPARCO Satellite Ground Station (سیٹلائٹ زمینی اسٹیشن) is a major space research center operated by the Space and Upper Atmosphere Research Commission (SUPARCO) in Pakistan. It is dedicated to earth observational and remote sensing technology.

Located in Rawat, near Islamabad, the station has an acquisition zone of approximately 2500 kilometers radius, covering Pakistan and 25 other countries, including those in South Asia, Central Asia, Western Asia, and the Middle East.

The SUPARCO Satellite Ground Station acquires and archives data from various earth resources satellites. It offers these data products and related services to both domestic and international users.
