= Abdali-I =

Short-range ballistic missile

Hatf-II Abdali
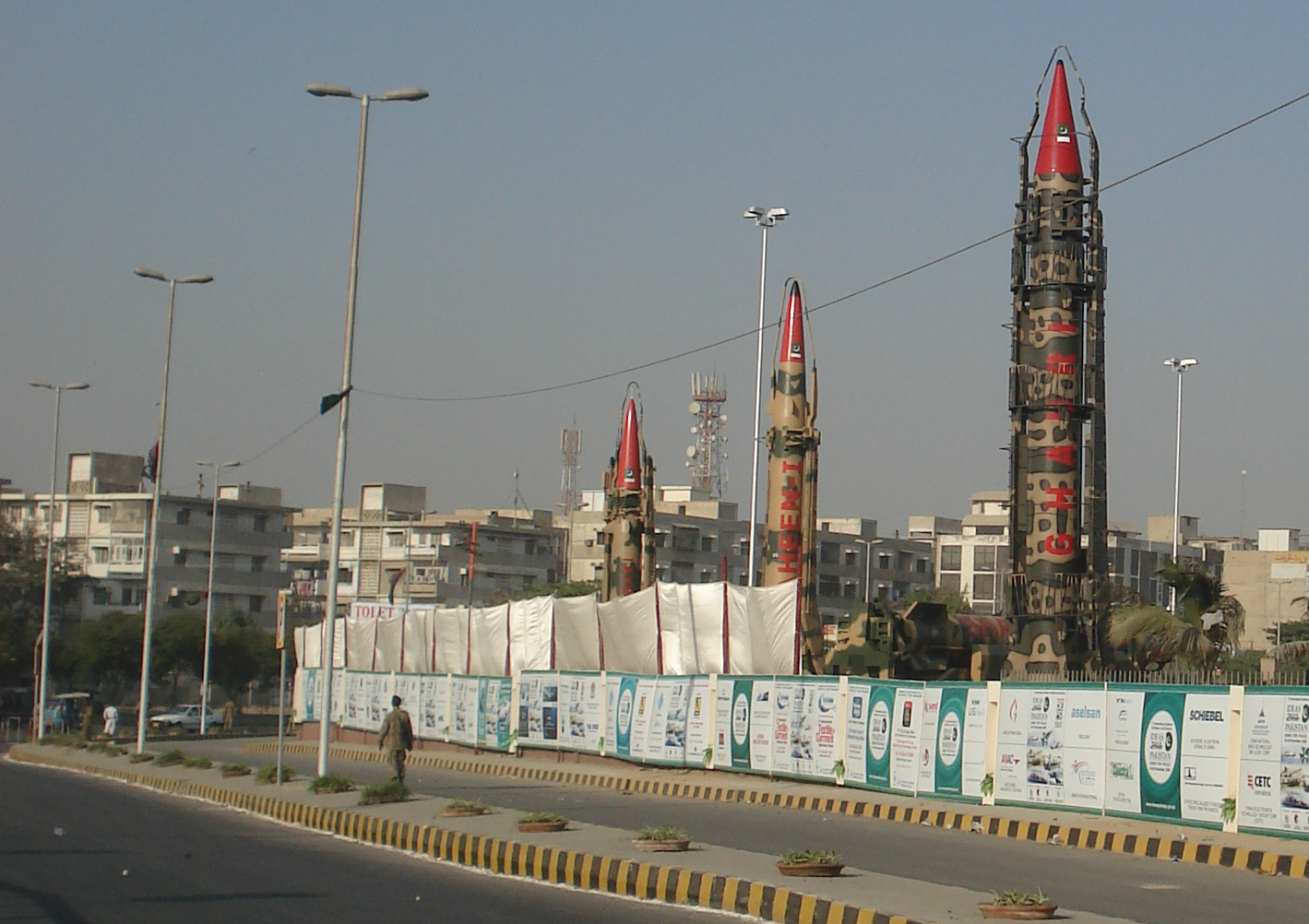
- The Hatf-II Abdali (left) in Karachi, ca. 2008.
- Type: SRBM
- Place of origin: Pakistan

Service history
- Used by: Pakistan Army: Army Strategic Forces Command

Production history
- Designer: SUPARCO (Rocket stage); DESTO (Warhead design/assembly)
- Designed: 1993–97
- Manufacturer: SUPARCO

Specifications (Technical data)
- Mass: 1,750 kg (3,860 lb)
- Length: 9.75 m (384 in)
- Diameter: 0.56 m (22 in)
- Maximum firing range: 450 km (280 mi)
- Warhead: Single conventional HE/ICM
- Warhead weight: 500 kg (1,100 lb)
- Transmission: Automatic
- Suspension: MAZ-7310 8WD (With Pakistani military markings)
- Propellant: Solid-propellent
- Guidance system: Inertial, Terminal
- Accuracy: 100 m (330 ft)—150 m (490 ft) CEP.
- Launch platform: Transporter erector launcher (TEL)

The Abdali (Urdu: ابدالى; Military designation: Hatf–II; Trans.: Target-2) is a land-based tactical ballistic missile currently in military service with the strategic command of the Pakistan Army.

Designed and developed by the Space Research Commission (SUPARCO), the program is named after Ahmad Shah Abdali with its Pakistani military deployment designated as Hatf-II.

Originally, the design was conceived in 1993 but was cancelled due to acquisition of M-11 missiles from China in 1994. Despite cancellation, the work on the program continued and was made feasible for funding in 1995 when the new design was approved for deployment.

== Design and specification ==
The Abdali missile system is derived from the Hatf-I, with its accuracy deemed sufficient for targeting military installations such as enemy bases or airfields. Originally conceptualized in 1993, the Abdali program was envisioned as a two-stage iteration of the Hatf-I. Essentially, a solid-propellant stage was affixed to the base of the Hatf-I. However, this design was initially rejected by the Defense Ministry during Benazir Bhutto's administration, which opted to acquire Chinese M-11 missiles in 1994. Despite the cancellation, the design work persisted and evolved, eventually receiving approval in 1995.

The Abdali missile boasts a range of 450 kilometres (280 mi), with an accuracy of 100 meters to 150 meters Circular Error Probable (CEP). It is equipped with either inertial guidance or traditional terminal guidance systems. While the Abdali is not capable of carrying nuclear explosives, it can accommodate single High Explosive (HE) or Improved Conventional Munition (ICM) warheads.

The Abdali missile system can be outfitted with a variable payload weighing up to 500 kilograms, with a launch weight of 1,750 kilograms. Powered by a single-stage solid propellant engine, it features dimensions of 9.75 meters in length and 0.56 meters in width. For transportation, the Abdali is mounted on Pakistan's reverse-engineered Soviet eight-wheel drive MAZ-7310 truck, prominently displaying Pakistani military markings.

== Operational history ==
In 1993, the Pakistani government initiated discussions regarding the acquisition of M-11 missiles from China for rapid deployment. However, while Pakistan succeeded in procuring the M-11 missiles, attempts to reverse-engineer the Chinese system to extend its range and add nuclear capability were unsuccessful. This failure stemmed from the fact that the M-11 was never designed for such purposes.

Eventually, under the administration of Benazir Bhutto, the Ministry of Defence (MoD) agreed to allocate funds for the Abdali program, with SUPARCO assuming the role of designer and the Defence Science and Technology Organization (DESTO) tasked with warhead design and assembly. With the Prime Minister's support, a new design was conceptualized in 1997, and development of the program proceeded clandestinely until 2001.

On 28 May 2002, the Abdali-I was successfully test-fired for the first time from the Sonmiani Flight Test Range, reaching its designated range of 110 miles (180 kilometers). The Inter-Services Public Relations (ISPR) noted the test trial as "successful," and testing was temporarily concluded. Subsequent tests were conducted in 2005 and 2006. Currently, the Abdali-I is operational with the ASFC.

Concurrently, the Abdali-I underwent another test from a Transporter Erector Launcher (TEL) system and successfully reached its designated range of 110 miles (180 kilometers). Its final test was conducted on 13 February 2013.

The Pakistani military designates the deployment and color marking for this system as Hatf-II. However, the codename for this system, in remembrance of Afghan Emperor Ahmad Shāh Durrānī, whose dynasty founded the Great Afghanistan and was noted for frequent conflicts with India, is Abdali-I.
