= Sonmiani Flight Test Range =

Pakistani rocket launch facility

Agency overview
- Formed: 1961
- Headquarters: Sonmiani, Balochistan, Pakistan; 25°12′N 66°45′E
- Parent agency: Space and Upper Atmosphere Research Commission (SUPARCO)
- Website: NTI Sonmani FTR

Map
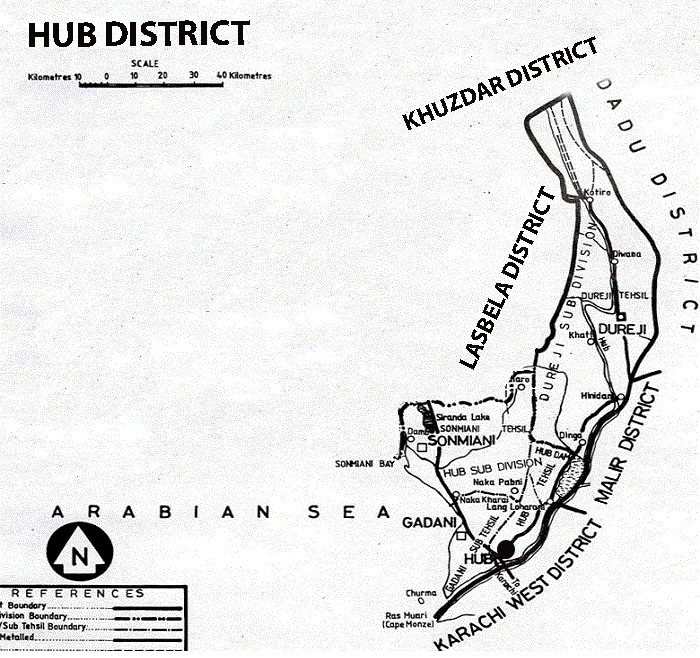
- Sonmani Flight Test Range though its accuracy is questionable.

The Flight Test Range (FTR) at Sonmiani Beach is a rocket launch site in Balochistan, approximately 50 kilometres (31 mi) west of Karachi, Sindh, Pakistan.

The facility is operated by the Space Research Commission since 1961, initially focusing on supporting civilian space program involving the launch of sounding rockets but its present mission has now been moved towards military programs.

== History ==
Initially established at Sonmiani Rocket Range in 1961, the Sonmiani Flight Test Range is the only rocket launch facility operated by the Space & Upper Atmosphere Research Commission. It was the crucial contribution from the American National Aeronautics and Space Administration (NASA) that established the facility in 1961 with Suparco launching the Rehbar-I program that consisted of a Nike-Cajun combination on 7 June 1962.

In 1989, the Sonmiani FTR mission moved from supporting the civilian space program towards also supporting the military program when Hatf-I (lit. Target) was launched from the facility. Since 1990, the Sonmiani FTR has been expanded and modernized that now includes several rocket launch sites, a rocket assembly and a maintenance workshop; a payload assembly area; high-speed tracking radars with a control room and telemetry station; flight communications equipment and optical cameras. It is currently spread across 200 hectares (490 acres).

The Sonmani FTR, not a space center, now serves as a primary launch site for Pakistani military's missile testing program, namely launching the Hatf program (Target), including four tests of Hatf-II, two of Hatf-III, seven of Hatf-IV and five of Hatf-VI.

== See also ==
- Mashhood Test Firing Range
