= SUPARCO =

National Space Agency of Pakistan

Space & Upper Atmosphere Research Commission
- خلائی و بالائے فضائی تحقیقاتی مأموریہ

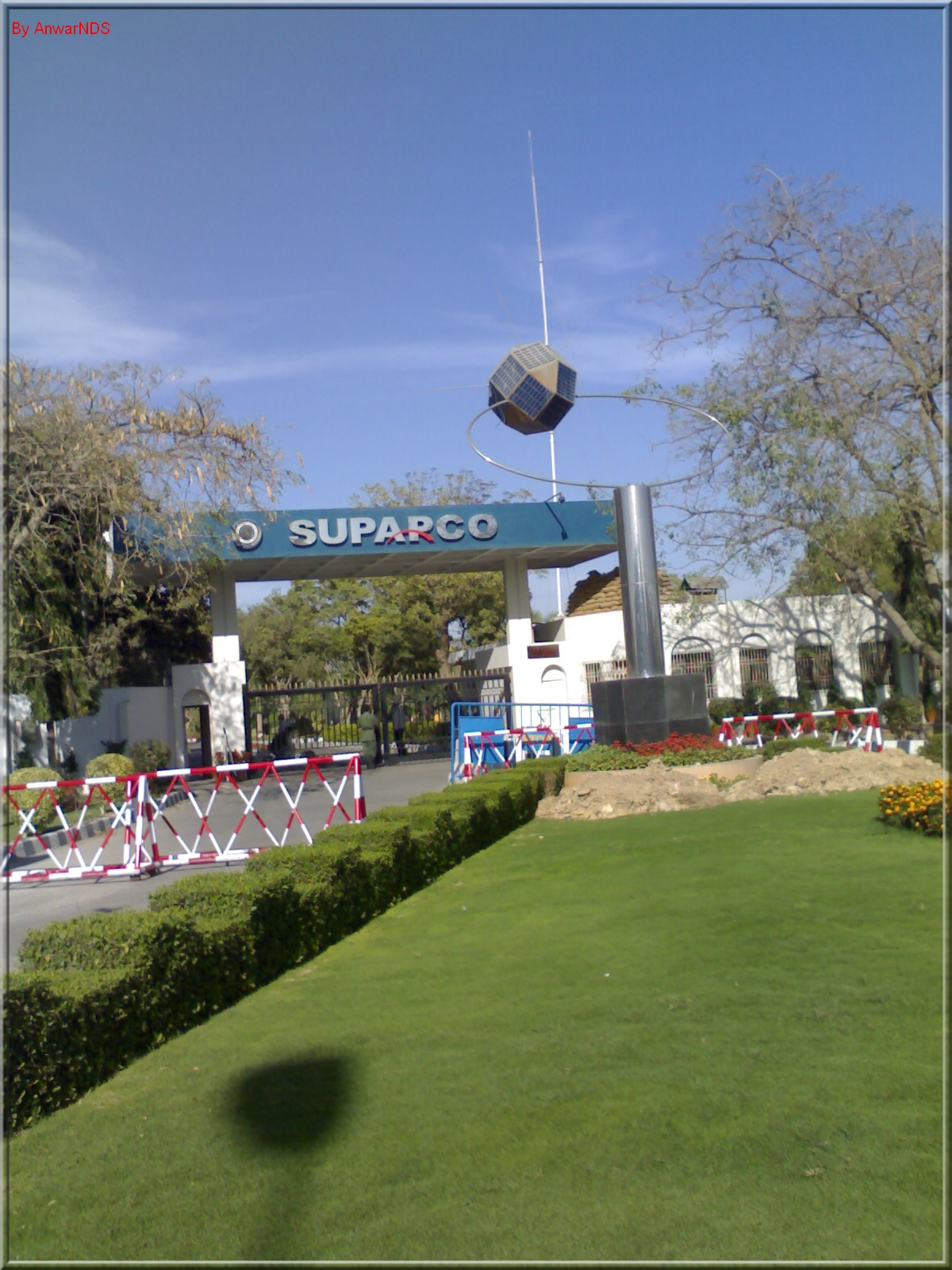
- SUPARCO complex in Karachi, Sindh

Agency overview
- Abbreviation: SUPARCO
- Formed: Committee: 1961 - Karachi Commission: 1981 - Karachi
- Type: Space agency
- Jurisdiction: Government of Pakistan
- Status: Active
- Headquarters: Islamabad-45900, Pakistan
- Chairman: Muhammad Yusuf Khan
- Key people: Dr. Abdus Salam; Dr. Abdul Majid; Dr. Salim Mehmud
- Primary spaceport: Sonmiani FTR
- Owner: National Command Authority
- Employees: Classified
- Annual budget: ▼ Rs. 5418 million (US$19.38 million) (2025–26)
- Website: suparco.gov.pk

The Space & Upper Atmosphere Research Commission, (Note: Urdu: خلائی و بالائ فضائی تحقیقاتی مأموریہ) commonly referred to as SUPARCO, is the national space agency of Pakistan.

The agency, originally established in 1961 as a committee in Karachi, became an independent commission in 1981. Its initial objective was to study rocketry and high-altitude research from the United States, which eventually led to the development of a national satellite programme. This culminated in the successful launch of Pakistan's first satellite from China in 1990. The agency was also an early participant in the rocket development programme launched by the Ministry of Defence of Pakistan.

The agency leads the National Space Programme (NSP) and maintains the orbital operations of its satellites with support facilities throughout the country.

SUPARCO also serves as the secretariat for Pakistan Space Activities Regulatory Board (PSARB) which was established in February 2024 under the National Command Authority to regulate all space-related activities in Pakistan.

== History ==
=== Creation ===
The past federal ministries of Pakistan initially avoided to fund the space programme and engineering education in spite of opportunity available from the United States. The Punjab University was the only university that was undertaking the research in aeronautics in 1957; after the former Soviet Union launched its first satellite in space, the Sputnik 1.

It was during the development of Apollo programme in 1961 when Abdus Salam found an opportunity for Pakistan to start its space programme with the foreign funding coming from the United States. As NASA launched the Apollo programme in competition with the Soviet space programme, it recognised the need for scientific data from the upper atmosphere and therefore invited India and Pakistan—two Indian Ocean–bordering states—to participate in related studies and experiments. Initially, the engineers from Pakistan Atomic Energy Commission (PAEC) learned rocketry at the Wallops Flight Facility as Abdus Salam worked on getting approval for establishing a commission from the Ayub administration.

A commission to study the upper atmosphere and rocketry was established under Abdus Salam and Ishrat Usmani as its chairman with nuclear engineers from PAEC, Tariq Mustafa and Salim Mehmud, becoming its first members in 1961 through the "Space Sciences Research Wing" of PAEC. The Commission was the first in the Muslim world to start studies in establishing a national space programme, and was named as "Space and Upper Atmosphere Research Commission" to represent its purpose and mission on 16 September 1961.

The Commission working under Abdus Salam was tasked with learning the rocket engineering, and contribution from France and the United States helped start this mission. Foundation of the agency made Pakistan the first South Asian country to start a space programme. Furthermore, a Flight Test Range was established in Sonmiani which is 50 km (31 mi) west of Karachi, from where a programme of sounding rocket launches was conducted based on the Nike-Ajax rockets followed by the Judi-Dart programme.

On 7 July 1962, the Commission launched the first rocket, known as "Rehbar-I", which reached the altitude of 80 mi (420,000 ft) in space. The United States publicly supported and hailed the programme as the beginning of "a programme of continuous co-operation in space research of mutual interest." Until 1972, the United States provided training on rocket engines at the Goddard Space Flight Center. The ground stations for satellite navigation were set up by the Commission in Karachi and Lahore in 1973, and were visited by the Apollo 17 astronauts. In 1973, the Islamabad Ionospheric Station was established at the Quaid-e-Azam University and Landsat ground station was established near Lahore.

=== Funding and Support ===
Following the cessation of U.S. funding for upper atmosphere research in 1972 and the prioritisation of nuclear weapons programmes after the 1971 war with India, SUPARCO experienced a significant decline in funding and support. Engineers with backgrounds in nuclear engineering were transferred to the Pakistan Atomic Energy Commission, and the Pakistan Air Force's support for the Rehbar programme also ceased.

Following India's launch of its first satellite Aryabhata on a Soviet Kosmos-3M rocket in 1975, SUPARCO began lobbying for Pakistan's own satellite programme. In 1981, the Commission was reorganized as an independent federal agency. During the same period, a communication satellite project called PakSAT was initiated. Collaborations with the Pakistan Radio Society (PRS) and the University of Surrey in England enabled SUPARCO to participate in satellite engineering projects, contributing to the development of UoSAT-1 and UO-11, which were launched in 1984.

Pakistan's communication satellite programme also led to the expansion of a ground station in Lahore in 1983. SUPARCO began constructing its first satellite, Badr-1, in 1983, and it was eventually launched by China in 1990 after negotiations with the United States failed.

SUPARCO continued its collaboration with the United Kingdom, developing the Badr-B satellite in partnership with the British Rutherford Laboratory. However, due to orbital crises and funding constraints, Badr-B was not launched until 2001 by Russia.

Gen Zia's decision to delay the PakSAT project in 1984, citing a lack of funds, led to a significant setback for SUPARCO. This ultimately resulted in the loss of two orbital slots in 1993 and 1994. To secure a priority slot, the agency negotiated with Hughes Satellite Systems to acquire PakSAT-1, a geo-stationary satellite originally intended for Indonesia.

== Functions ==
As per the National Space Policy of Pakistan approved in 2024, SUPARCO as the National Space Agency is mandated to carry out all activities related to outer space which includes but not limited to the following:

1. Policy Development: Formulate national space policies and legislation to comply with international obligations and establish guidelines for the space sector.
2. Programme Management: Plan, manage, and execute the National Space Programme, encompassing space science, technology, and applications.
3. Space Infrastructure: Design, develop, launch, and operate satellites, ground control infrastructure, space transportation systems, launch facilities, navigation systems, and tracking observatories.
4. National Register: Maintain a register of space objects launched by Pakistan and submit information to the United Nations.
5. Commercialisation: Promote the commercial exploitation of space capabilities, technologies, and applications.
6. Private Sector Engagement: Encourage private sector involvement in space activities.
7. International Cooperation: Co-ordinate with international space organizations and agencies, and represent Pakistan in relevant forums.

== Programmes ==
=== Satellite Programmes ===
==== Badr ====
Badr Programme
Satellite	Mass and weight	Satellite by type	Launch agency	Launch site	Status	Launch date	Remarks and notes
Badr-1	52 kg (115 lb)	Communications	CASC	Xichang in China	Inactive	16 July 1990	Built in co-ordinate with University of Surrey
Badr-B	68.5 kg (151 lb)	Earth observation	Roscosmos	Baikonur in Kazakhstan	Inactive	12 December 2001	Built in coordination with Rutherford Laboratory.

==== PakSAT ====
The PakSAT programme is the national communication satellites programme of the commission conceived in 1979–80. The programme is envisioned to consist of two geostationary communication satellites – one operating in 38°E orbit and other at 41°E, respectively.

The PakSAT programme was originally designed to develop the television receive-only (TVRO) terminals for the receptions of news, entertainment, and educational channels from direct broadcasting satellite dishes.

PakSAT Programme
Satellite	Mass and weight	Satellite by type	Launch agency	Launch site	Status	Launch date	Remarks and notes
PakSAT-1E	3,000 kg (6,600 lb)	GEO	Hughes	Cape Canaveral in United States	Inactive	1 February 1996	Built and owned by the Boeing.
PakSAT-1R	5,515 kg (12,158 lb)	GEO	CASC	Xichang	Active	11 August 2011	Built and manufactured by China with Chinese funding
PakSAT-MM1	4,137 kg (9,121 lb)	GEO	Hughes	Cape Canaveral	Inactive	5 March 2018	Built and manufactured by Boeing
PakSAT-MM1R	5,400 kg (11,900 lb)	GEO	CASC	Xichang	Active	30 May 2024	Built by CASC

==== Remote Sensing Satellites ====
Pakistani Remote Sensing Satellites
Satellite	Mass and weight	Satellite by type	Launch agency	Launch site	Status	Launch date	Remarks and notes
PakTES-1A	300 kg (660 lb)	LEO	CNSA	Jiuquan	Active	9 July 2018	Built and manufactured by SUPARCO
PRSS-1	300 kg (660 lb)	LEO	CNSA	Jiuquan	Active	9 July 2018	Jointly built and manufactured by China and Pakistan
PRSC-EO1	-	LEO	CASC	Jiuquan	Active	17 January 2025	Built and manufactured by SUPARCO locally
PRSS-2	-	LEO	CASC	Xichang	Active	31 July 2025	Jointly built and manufactured by China and Pakistan
Hyperspectral Satellite 1 (HS-1)	-	LEO	CASC	Jiuquan	Active	19 October 2025	Built by SUPARCO
PRSC-EO2	-	LEO	CASC	Yangjiang Seashore Launch Centre	Active	12 February 2026	Built and manufactured by SUPARCO
PRSC-EO3	-	LEO	CASC	Taiyuan Satellite Launch Center	Active	25 April 2026	Built and manufactured by SUPARCO

==== CubeSats ====
Pakistani CubeSats
Satellite	Mass and weight	Satellite by type	Launch agency	Launch site	Launch date	Remarks and notes
ICube-1	1.08 kg (2.4 lb)	1U CubeSat	Kosmotras	Dombarovsky 370/13	21 November 2013	Built by IST
ICUBE-Q	9.0 kg (19.8 lb)	Lunar Orbiter	CNSA	Wenchang	3 May 2024	Jointly built by Institute of Space Technology, SUPARCO and Shanghai Jiao Tong University
PAUSAT-1	24 kg (52.9 lb)	16U CubeSat	SpaceX	Vandenberg Space Force Base	14 January 2025	Built by Air University Pakistan, launched from Space X Falcon 9 rocket onboard Transporter 12 mission.

=== Rocket Programmes ===
==== Sounding Rockets ====
Since 1961, the commission supported and led the early studies on solid-propellant rockets, which it succeeded in developing the Rehbar-I. The Rehbar-I rocket was a derivative based on the U.S. Nike-Cajun, and continued its service until 1972.

==== Hatf-I & Abdali ====
In 1987, the military funded the commission's design study on rocket engines for Hatf-I, which was completed with the Khan Research Laboratories (KRL), the national defense laboratory of the Ministry of Defence. In 1995, the Commission designed the rocket engine for the Abdali project, which was completed in 2004.

The Commission also conducted studies on rocket engines for the Shaheen programme.

=== Space Science and Astronomy ===
Every year, SUPARCO sponsors and organises the World Space Week (WSW) to promote the understanding of the Earth science all over the country. SUPARCO works with a number of universities and research institutions to engage in research in observational astronomy and astrophysics. The Institute of Space and Planetary Astrophysics (ISPA) of the Karachi University conducts key research and co-sponsors with international level research programmes in astrophysics, with joint ventures of SUPARCO.

SUPARCO operates a national balloon launching facility in Karachi to conduct studies in atmospheric sciences to determine the vertical profile of ozone up to 30–35 km. This balloon sounding facility has been extensively used for carrying out research in better understanding of the meteorology and how the ozone layer vary seasonally in the stratosphere and troposphere. The Ionospheric Station at Karachi operates a Lonosonde observation facility, and recently the balloon flight mission was carried out by the station on 16 January 2004, up to an altitude of about 36 km to measure the vertical profile of the O_{3} trends. The maximum O_{3} observed 12.65 mPa at 27 km. One of the most notable mission of SUPARCO is its Lunar programme that conducts observational studies on the activity of Lunar phases and distributes its publications within the public domain.

The SUPARCO Astrophysics programme, is an active scientific mission of SUPARCO, dedicated for the development of space science. The programme's mainstream objective and aim is to conduct research studies for the advancement and better understanding of the theoretical physics, astronomy, astrophysics, and mathematics involving the three-dimensional universal space and time.

SUPARCO's Space Programme 2040, launched in 2012, incorporates astronomy and astrophysics research into a single programme focused on theoretical and observational studies. This programme explores vast topics like quantum mechanics, deep space objects, dark matter and energy, supernovae, nebulae, and galaxies. Aligned with Pakistan's official space policy, it also aims to strengthen public understanding of physics and mathematics through educational initiatives like academic bulletins and public events celebrating astronomy milestones. This programme fosters collaboration with international space agencies and builds upon public interest sparked by SUPARCO's celebration of the International Year of Astronomy in 2009 which was widely appreciated by the public.

Since its establishment, a total of nine important publications has been released under the auspicious of this programme with the last volume was issued in September 2012.

=== Space Weather Monitoring ===
SUPARCO has been actively involved in space weather monitoring for over five decades, utilising a nationwide network of ground-based sensors. As Pakistan's reliance on satellites for critical services like communication, navigation, and earth observation increases, SUPARCO has established the Pakistan Space Weather Centre, which employs an array of instruments to observe space weather phenomena in real time. Processed data, including HF communication products, are then disseminated to relevant national users.

SUPARCO initiated its Geomagnetic Field Monitoring Programme in 1983 at the Sonmiani space facility, establishing a second observatory in Karachi in 2008. This programme involves studying the Earth's magnetic field and its variations in the South Asian region using data collected from these observatories. The data is used to understand the Earth's magnetic environment and mitigate associated hazards.

SUPARCO regularly publishes a public domain bulletin of geomagnetic data, which includes research on the effects of solar flares and severe magnetic storms recorded by the observatories.

On Sunday, 19th October 2025, SUPARCO announced the "successful launch" of their new H1 satellite from the Jiuquan Satellite Launch Centre in north-western China.

This is Pakistan's first hyperspectral satellite, described as a "major milestone". It aims to advance country objectives ranging from agriculture to urban planning.

Pakistan's Foreign Ministry says the new technology will greatly improve the country's abilities in areas like advanced farming, environmental protection, city development, and disaster response. It will also help identify natural hazard risks more accurately, supporting major development projects such as the China-Pakistan Economic Corridor.

Pakistan praised the launch of H1 as a major milestone for its space programme and a sign of its close cooperation with China in using space technology for peaceful purposes.

=== Satellite Navigation Programme ===
SUPARCO has been a pivotal player in Pakistan's satellite navigation landscape. Its involvement extends to the entire spectrum of satellite navigation, encompassing the design and development of space, ground, and user segments.

It has established a Ground Based Augmentation System (GBAS) on a proof of concept basis to provide correction signals to authorized users. Additionally, SUPARCO has deployed a Space Based Augmentation System (SBAS) via PakSAT-MM1 to cater to the specific needs of aviation, marine, and land users who require high-integrity correction signals.

SUPARCO operates a Satellite Navigation Signal Monitoring facility that plays a crucial role in monitoring, archiving, and analysing satellite navigation signals from various monitoring stations located across Pakistan. This facility fosters collaboration with national and international organisations involved in satellite navigation systems.

=== International COSPAS-SARSAT Programme ===
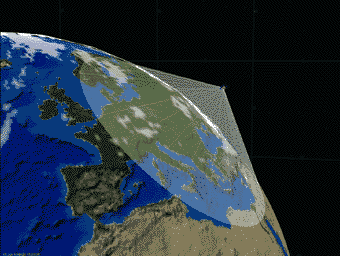
Pakistan Mission Control Centre (PAMCC) acts as the ground segment for the International Cospas-Sarsat Programme in the region.

Pakistan has been participating in a multinational humanitarian programme for satellite–aided search and rescue, the International Cospas-Sarsat Programme. In 1990, the Government of Pakistan accorded approval for SUPARCO's participation in the Cospas programme as ground segment provider and lead space station with close co-ordination with the Soviet Union. Over the years, the mission control centre has equipped itself with advanced technology and is capable of distributing distress alert data to rescue co-ordination centres in the country.

=== Remote Sensing Programme ===
SUPARCO has been a pioneer in introducing Remote Sensing/GIS and allied technologies in Pakistan, providing turnkey solutions and services to diverse users across various fields. These applications range from agriculture and forestry to disaster management, water resources, environmental monitoring, urban planning, and coastal and marine studies. SUPARCO's expertise extends to climate change and environmental degradation, utilising ground-based observations and satellite data for now-casting and forecasting environmental indicators in the atmosphere, biosphere, cryosphere, and hydrosphere. To support these endeavours, SUPARCO operates specialised centres and facilities, including environmental laboratories, mobile laboratories, a mathematical modelling centre, and a microgravity experiments facility.

=== Other Scientific programmes ===
- Scientific space research
- Geographic Information Systems
- Natural Resource Surveying
- Environmental monitoring
- Acquisition of data for atmospheric/meteorological studies
- Development of the ground-based infrastructure for navigation and special information system
- Development of research, test and production base of the space sector

== Facilities ==
SUPARCO, headquartered in Islamabad, maintains a network of key technical and support facilities across Pakistan. These facilities are strategically located in major cities to support the organization's various research and development activities.

=== Ground Stations ===
SUPARCO's Ground Stations
Facility Name	Location	Description	Sources
Satellite Ground Station (SGS)	Islamabad	Used for acquiring satellite imagery from a number of Pakistani and foreign satellites	
Satellite Ground Station (SGS)	Karachi	—	
Pakistan Mission Control Centre (PAMCC)	Karachi	Ground segment for the International Cospas-Sarsat Programme	

=== Space Applications Centres ===
Facility Name	Location	Description	Sources
Space Application and Research Centre Islamabad (SPARC-I)	Islamabad	Space applications centre	
Space Application and Research Centre Karachi (SPARC-K)	Karachi	Space applications centre	
Space Application Center for Response in Emergency and Disasters (SACRED)	Islamabad	Space based technical support during natural disasters	
National Centre of GIS & Space Applications (NCGSA)	Islamabad	Formed by HEC with IST as its secretariat. The centre comprises seven state-of-the-art research labs in seven partner higher education institutes of Pakistan.	

=== Research and Development Centres ===
R&D Centres
Facility Name	Location	Description	Sources
Satellite Research and Development Complex (SRDC-L)	Lahore	Design and development of satellites	
Satellite Research and Development Complex (SRDC-K)	Karachi	Design and development of satellites	

=== Space Ports ===
SUPARCO's Spaceports
Facility Name	Location	Description	Sources
Sonmiani FTR	Sonmiani	It has previously launched sounding rockets.	

=== Human resource development ===
Education and Training Institutes
Facility Name	Location	Description
SUPARCO Managed
Institute of Space Technology	Islamabad	Institute of Space Technology is a public sector university which offers degree programmes in Aerospace Engineering, Communication systems engineering, Material Engineering, Space Sciences and Mechanical Engineering.
SUPARCO Institute of Technical Training (SITT)	Karachi	A technical training facility. SUPARCO Institute of Technical Training (SITT) offers diploma programmes in Mechanical and Electronics Technology.
Others
Institute of Space and Planetary Astrophysics (ISPA)	Karachi University	ISPA is the nations leading and one of the oldest astronomical facility that was built and constructed by the United States. The ISPA is responsible for space and planetary science research. A number of foreign scientists have used and research the ISPA facility where they published numerous articles in the field of space sciences. The ISPA has also a powerful telescope and astronomical observatory which was last provided by the United States Government in the late 1950s.
Department of Space Science	University of Punjab	The facility carries out a wide variety of research programmes in the field of solar physics, plasma physics, astrophysics, remote sensing and planetary sciences. The Department of Space Science has a small astronomical observatory. It is the oldest astronomical observatory in the country and has remained a center of learning for more than 75 years.
National Centre for Remote Sensing and Geo-informatics (NCRG)	Institute of Space Technology, Karachi	National Centre of Excellence in remote sensing

== International Cooperation ==
SUPARCO, has consistently prioritised international cooperation as a central component of its space development programme. The agency maintains active membership in several international organisations, institutes, scientific committees and United Nations bodies like UNCOPUOS, UN-SPIDER, UN-ESCAP, COSPAR, IAF, ISPRS, APSCO etc. This has fostered collaboration in scientific and technical information exchange, data sharing, joint projects, technology transfer, training, collaborative studies. SUPARCO has also entered into numerous bilateral and multilateral cooperation agreements and MoUs to facilitate space-related activities. Pakistan is a signatory to all five United Nations treaties governing the peaceful uses of outer space.

=== Inter-Islamic Network on Space Sciences and Technology ===
ISNET was established in 1987 by the Organization of Islamic Cooperation (OIC) Standing Committee on Scientific and Technological Cooperation (COMSTECH) and SUPARCO hosted the founding meeting of the Network at Karachi. The secretariat of ISNET is located within SUPARCO and Chairman SUPARCO is the ex-officio President of ISNET. ISNET has 17 member states and it organises different international conferences, seminars, workshops, training courses related to space science, technology and satellite application in different member states in which a number of scientists, engineers and researchers stake-holders participate.

=== China ===
In August 2006, People's Republic of China signed an agreement with Pakistan to conduct joint research in space technology and committed to work with Pakistan to launch three Earth-weather satellites over the next five years. In May 2007, China (as a strategic partner) publicly signed an agreement with Pakistan to enhance cooperation in the areas of space science and technology. The Pakistan-China bilateral cooperation in the space industry span a broad spectrum, including climate science, clean energy technologies, atmospheric and Earth sciences, and marine sciences. On the occasion of Chinese launch of PakSAT-1R, Pakistan's ambassador to China expressed the natural desire of Pakistan for China to send the first officially designated Pakistani astronaut to space aboard a Chinese spacecraft. In cooperation with CNSA, Pakistan sent its first lunar orbiter mission called ICUBE-Q along with Chang'e 6. SUPARCO will also launch a 35kg lunar rover with the Chang'e 8 mission.

In April 2026, the China Manned Space Agency (CMSA) announced that Muhammad Zeeshan Ali and Khurram Daud has been selected as its first two international astronaut candidates. One of the two is expected to fly to the Chinese Tiangong space station for a one-week visit on the Shenzhou 24 mission in October 2026.

=== United Arab Emirates ===
In 2019, the commission reached out to United Arab Emirates Space Agency to take part in the Global Space Congress for the first time held at Abu Dhabi, where they held an exhibition on their satellite-related projects.

=== Turkey ===
In December 2006, Turkey showed interest to form a joint-venture with Asia-Pacific Space Cooperation Organization where Pakistan is a member. In 2006, Turkish minister of science, accompanied by the Turkish Ambassador to Pakistan, signed the Memorandum of understanding (MOU) with Pakistan to form a joint-venture with Pakistan in the development of satellite technology. The Scientific and Technological Research Council of Turkey and Turkish Aerospace Industries's senior ranking officials and representative signed a separate accord with the SUPARCO to enhance the cooperation in the satellite development programme.

== Leadership History ==
#	Name	Term started	Term Ended	Alma Mater	Field(s)	Educational Background
1.	Dr Abdus Salam	1961	1967	Imperial College, London University of the Punjab, Lahore	Theoretical Physics	Doctor of Philosophy (PhD)
2.	Dr Ishrat Hussain Usmani (Co-Chairman)	1961	1967	Imperial College, London	ICS	PhD
3.	Air Cdre. Władysław Turowicz	1967	1969	Warsaw University of Technology	Aeronautical Engineering, Astrodynamics	MSc, PhD
4.	Air Cdre. K. M. Ahmad	1969	1973	Pakistan Air Force Academy	Aeronautical Engineering	Graduate
5.	Dr Salim Mehmud	1980	1989	Oak Ridge Institute for Science and Education and Oak Ridge National Laboratory	Nuclear Engineering, Electrical engineering, Physics, Mathematics, Electronics engineering	Masters
6.	Dr M. Shafi Ahmad	1989	1990	University of London	Astronomy	PhD
7.	Engr. Sikandar Zaman	1990	1997	University of Michigan	Mechanical / Aeronautical Engineering	Masters
8.	Dr Abdul Majid	1997	2001	University of Wales	Astrophysics	PhD
9.	Major General Raza Hussain	2001	2010	Pakistan Army Corps of Electrical and Mechanical Engineers	Electrical Engineering	BS
10.	Major General Ahmed Bilal	2010	2016	Pakistan Army Corps of Signals Engineering	Computer Engineering	Master of Science (MS)
11.	Major General Qaiser Anees Khurram	2016	2018	Pakistan Army Corps of Electrical and Mechanical Engineers	Mechanical Engineering	BS
12.	Major General Amer Nadeem	2018	2023	Pakistan Army Corps of Electrical and Mechanical Engineers	Aeronautical Engineering	BS
13.	Muhammad Yusuf Khan	2023	Incumbent	University of Peshawar	Master of Science	MS

== See also ==
- List of government space agencies
- SUPARCO's spaceflight missions and tests
- SUPARCO Space Programme 2040
- Jinnah Antarctic Station
- Pakistani missile research and development programme

== Sources ==
- Lele, Ajey (2012). Asian Space Race: Rhetoric or Reality. Springer press, Institute for Defense Studies and Analyses. ISBN 9788132207337.
