= Badr (satellite) =

Series of satellites by Pakistan

Badr-1
- Mission type: Experimental
- Operator: SUPARCO
- COSPAR ID: 1990-059A
- SATCAT no.: 20685
- Website: Badr-A
- Mission duration: 30 days (planned); 35 days (achieved)

Spacecraft properties
- Manufacturer: SUPARCO
- Launch mass: 52 kg

Start of mission
- Launch date: 16 July 1990, 00:40:00 UTC
- Rocket: Long March 2E
- Launch site: Xichang, LA-2

End of mission
- Last contact: 20 August 1990
- Decay date: 8 December 1990

Orbital parameters
- Reference system: Geocentric orbit
- Regime: Low Earth orbit

Badr-B
- Mission type: Earth observation satellite
- Operator: SUPARCO
- COSPAR ID: 2001-056C
- SATCAT no.: 26703
- Website: Badr B
- Mission duration: 10 years (planned)

Spacecraft properties
- Manufacturer: SUPARCO
- Launch mass: 68 kg

Start of mission
- Launch date: 10 December 2001, 17:19:00 UTC
- Rocket: Zenit-2
- Launch site: Baikonour, Site 45

End of mission
- Last contact: 2012

Orbital parameters
- Reference system: Geocentric orbit
- Regime: Low Earth orbit
- Perigee altitude: 986 km
- Apogee altitude: 1014 km
- Inclination: 99.7°
- Period: 105.0 minutes

Badr was a series of satellites operated by Pakistan.

== History ==
The first satellite, Badr-1, was launched in July 1990. It was the first SUPARCO-engineered object to orbit the Earth. That launch took place on July 16, 1990, as part of the International Frequency Registration Bureau. The Urdu word "Badr" literally means "Full Moon," and its launch vehicle was the Chinese Long March 2E space rocket.

The Badr series consisted of two satellites, both developed by SUPARCO. Badr-1 successfully completed its designated life. Badr-B was the second spacecraft and the first Earth observation satellite launched by Pakistan. It was placed into Sun-synchronous orbit on December 10, 2001, at 5:19 PM UTC.

The Badr program was decommissioned in 2012 after Badr-B completed its mission successfully. The Pakistan Remote Sensing Satellite has replaced the Badr program since 2018.
