= Judi-Dart =

Sounding rocket

The Judi-Dart is a United States solid fueled sounding rocket. It was manufactured by Rocket Power Inc. It belonged to the Loki rocket family. The Judi-Dart was launched 89 times between 1964 and 1970. The Judi-Dart has a length of 2.70 metres, a diameter of 0.08 metres, a maximum flight altitude of 65 kilometres and a launch thrust of 9000 newtons.

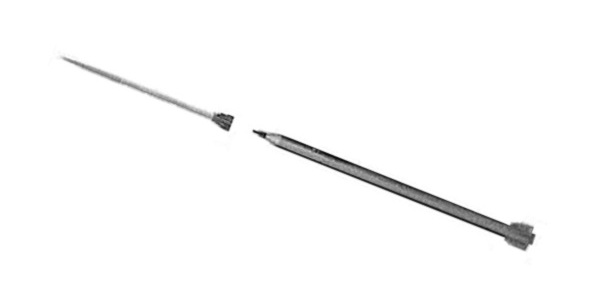
A Judi-Dart rocket

== Description ==
=== Engine ===
The engine was internal combustion, with 1.70 m long and 8 cm in diameter (1.9KS2150) with an initial thrust of 9 kN, and a combustion time of only 2 seconds, reaching almost a speed of 1500 m/s. At this time, the engine separates from the bolt, which reaches its 75 km peak at around 135 seconds after ignition start.

=== Dart ===
The upper part of the rocket was a cylinder 4 cm in diameter and approximately 1 m high, and aerodynamically optimized. The diameter of this dart varied slightly depending on the payload.

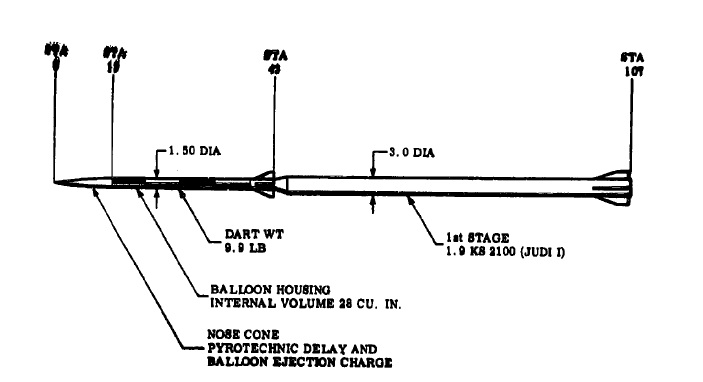
Scheme of Judi-Dart rocket

== Usage ==
It was used for meteorological survey by different countries in between 30 and 60 km altitude. The dart was propelled by the Judi rocket to an altitude of approximately 76 km, when a small explosive expelled the payload, normally made up of polarized metal sheets (copper) which were then tracked in their lateral movement. In addition to this standard payload, others were supported, such as: parachutes, inflatable spheres, and temperature sensors. It was used by following different organisations:

- NASA
- ISRO
- SUPARCO
