= Army Strategic Forces Command (Pakistan) =

Pakistan Army's field maneuver strike corps

- Badge of Army Strategic Forces Command, Rawalpindi
- Active: 2000; 26 years ago
- Country: Pakistan
- Branch: Pakistan Army
- Type: Command and control (C2)
- Role: Strategic deterrence Ground-based First Strike
- Size: ☓☓☓ Corps (Though, it is vary due to troops rotations based on strategic calculus)
- Headquarters: Joint Staff HQ in Chaklala, Punjab, Pakistan
- Colors Identification: Red and White

Commanders
- Commander: Lt-Gen. Shahbaz Khan
- Chief of Staff: Brig. Amer Riaz

Insignia
- Flag

The Pakistan Army Strategic Forces Command (ASFC) is a strategic and missile formation of the Pakistan Army. Headquartered at the Joint Staff HQ in Chaklala near Rawalpindi, the strategic command controls the land-based ballistics and cruise missile systems—both nuclear and conventional.

Its organizational structure is model based on the conventional corps with its operations similar to Regiment of Artillery, and responsible only for the ground-based strategic nuclear deterrence.

== History ==
In Pakistani military terminology, the missiles are understood as self-propelled projectile ammunition that can be used as an artillery. The army's strategic forces command provides the Pakistani military strategists a ground-based option for operational nuclear deterrent. Establishment of the strategic forces command came with many hurdles when it comes to military deployment of nuclear weapons since very few Pakistani army officers had modest understanding of military strategy involving nuclear weapons deployment— it mostly relied on U.S. military's field manuals.

The organizational structure of the army's strategic force command is modeled after the conventional corps with many star ranking officers came from the Regiment of Artillery, including Lt-Gen. Khalid Kidwai who was its first officer. Although, the army's strategic forces command functions under the security parameters of Strategic Plans Division of the National Command Authority (NCA), it is a military unit that forms the strategic deterrent together with the Air Force and the Navy.}

In March 2000, the formation was organized at command level based and entirely influenced on conventional corps and artillery formation structure. In 2002, this command was only made responsible for ground-based nuclear deterrent with First Strike strategy with first battalions of missile batteries were created; the army's command has only command and control (C2) of the deployed nuclear weapons on missile system.

Despite its size, structural organization, and importance given since 2004, the coherent operational command, control, communication, and intelligence (C3I) remains link to be with the Pakistan Air Force's Strategic Command, which has the control over the launch and target selection of the nuclear weapons.

== Employment ==
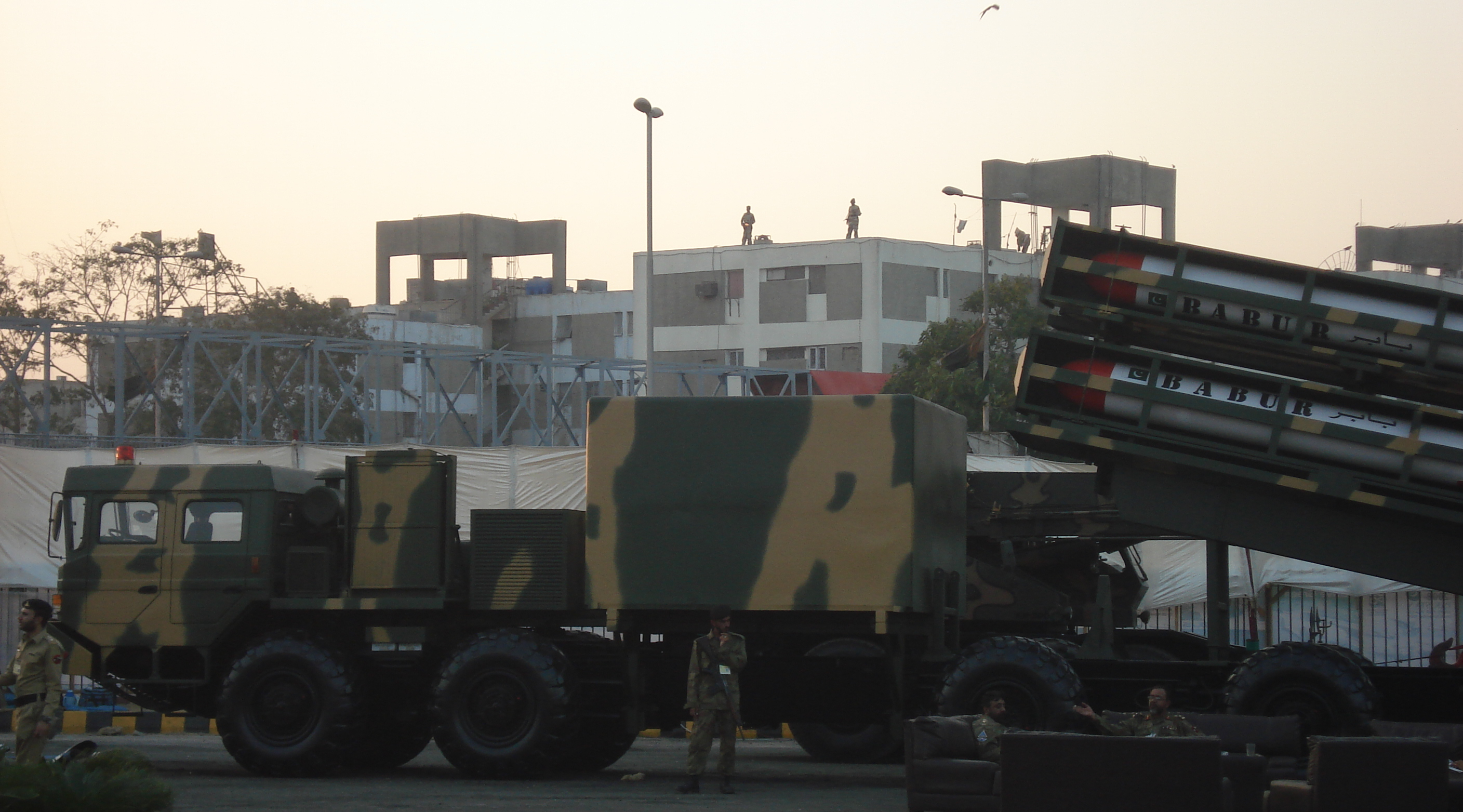
Pakistan Army officers with the ground-based Babur system in Karachi in 2008.

The Army's strategic forces command maintains and controls the employment of the transporter erector launchers, which is a primary ground-based delivery system. The strategic forces command is distributed among the Pakistan Army Reserves North and South formation, focusing towards its eastern border.

Both Pakistan Army Reserves controls the numbers of missile groups that are equivalent to Brigade formation, which loosely follows the Pakistan Army's Regiment of Artillery's field manual and its command structure. The army's strategic forces command support capabilities is supported by the numbers of regiments consisting of signals, engineers, surveyors, intelligence, security elements, and among others.

In spite of its size and importance, the Army's strategic forces command does not have operational access to launch codes or any access to the nation's nuclear weapons; and the release of weapon comes directly from the authorization at higher level of military leadership based in JS HQ and the civilian leadership in Islamabad. This action prevented the accidental launch of the weapon system or mishappening. In addition, the Army HQ has missile batteries and support battalions routinely rotated in the country that makes it difficult to exact its permanent size and troops strength.

== Influence ==
In 2004, the Pakistan Navy, which follows the training manuals and tradition of the Pakistan Army, established its own separated strategic command. Besides the army, the navy is the only military service that controls its own class of guided and cruise missile systems.

The Pakistan Army supported the Pakistan Navy's command by terming its command as "custodian of the nation's 2nd strike capability" in 2008.

=== List of Commanders ===
Commanders of the Army Strategic Forces Command
Officer commanding of the Army Strategic Forces Command		Start of Assignment	End of Assignment
10.	Lieutenant-General Shahbaz Khan	December 2022	Incumbent
9.	Lieutenant-General Muhammad Ali	December 2020	December 2022
8.	Lieutenant-General Ikram Ahmad	October 2018	December 2020
7.	Lieutenant-General Hilal Hussain	September 2015	October 2018
6.	Lieutenant-General Obaidullah Khan Khattak	January 2014	September 2015
5.	Lieutenant-General Tariq Nadeem Gilani	October 2011	December 2013
4.	Lieutenant-General Jamil Haider	October 2010	October 2011
3.	Lieutenant-General Absar Hussain	April 2007	October 2010
2.	Lieutenant-General Khalid Munir	May 2005	April 2007
1.	Lieutenant-General Ghulam Mustafa	April 2002	May 2005

== See also ==
- Air Force Strategic Command (Pakistan)
- Naval Strategic Forces Command (Pakistan)
- Islamic Revolutionary Guard Corps Aerospace Force
