= List of North Korean missile tests =

North Korea has tested numerous missiles since 1984. North Korea has tested short-range ballistic missile (SRBMs), intermediate-range ballistic missile (IRBMs), intercontinental ballistic missiles (ICBMs), maneuverable reentry vehicles (MaRV) ballistic missiles, and cruise missiles. Some North Korean missile tests have failed (i.e., with an explosion in flight), while others have been successful. North Korea claimed to have tested a hypersonic weapon for the first time in 2021 and several times thereafter, although it is unclear whether it actually did so.

North Korea has fired a number of SRBMs into the Sea of Japan, in what have been interpreted as political gestures.

North Korea established its Tonghae Satellite Launching Ground in 1984 and began tests of strategic missiles. Fifteen were carried out under the rule of Kim Il Sung; fourteen of these were carried out at Tonghae. After his death in 1994, he was succeeded by his son Kim Jong Il, who paused testing for four years before resuming in 1998 with a test of the Taepodong-1 missile. Following an international backlash, Kim Jong Il paused testing again before lifting the moratorium in 2006. Ultimately, 16 missile tests were undertaken under Kim Jong Il, mostly at the Kittaeryong site near Wonsan. Since Kim Jong Un took power in 2011, North Korea steeply increased the number of missile tests, tallying 129 as of April 2023. Under Kim Jong Un, North Korea conducted tests at many sites around the country, and many appeared to be operational/training tests in preparation for war, rather than developmental tests. The Tonghae site became dormant in 2009; space launches were shifted to the Sohae Satellite Launching Station and developmental missile testing shifted to the Wonsan site. Older missiles in North Korea's arsenal include various Scud and Nodong missiles, while newer missiles in development include the Pukguksong-1, Pukguksong-2, Hwasong-10 (Musudan), and Unha-3.

== Timeline ==
Date	Information
1976–81	North Korea commences its missile development program using Scud-B from the Soviet Union and a launchpad from Egypt.
April 9, 1984	First Scud-B (Hwasong-5) missile test firing.
September 1984	North Korea test-fired Scud-B (Hwasong-5) missile three times.
May 1986	Secret test of "long-range guided missile", according to South Korean Defense Minister Lee Ki-Baek.
1988	Operational deployment of Scud-B (Hwasong-5) and Scud-C (Hwasong-6) missiles.
May 1990	First Hwasong-7 (Nodong) missile test, but failed.
May 29, 1993	Test-fires of Hwasong-6 and Hwasong-7.
August 31, 1998	North Korea fires off its first ballistic missile, the Unha-1 rocket, also known as the Taepodong-1 missile, from the launch site of Musudan-ri in North Hamgyong Province.
September 24, 1999	North Korea agrees to a moratorium on long-range missile tests.
2002	North Korea pledges to extend moratorium on missile tests beyond 2003.
2004	North Korea reaffirms moratorium.
2005	North Korea fires short-range missile into Sea of Japan.
March 8, 2006	North Korea has test fired two short-range missiles into Sea of Japan.
July 5, 2006	2006 North Korean missile test – Failed test-fire of Taepodong-2. Hwasong-6 and Hwasong-7 were also tested.
May 25, 2007	North Korea fired short-range missiles.
June 7, 2007	North Korea fires missiles off coast.
March 28, 2008	North Korea fires three ship-to-ship missiles.
May 30, 2008	North Korea fires three short-range missiles into west coast.
October 7, 2008	North Korea fires short-range missiles into international water.
April 5, 2009	Failed orbit of the Kwangmyongsong-2 satellite aboard an Unha-2 carrier rocket.
July 2, 2009	2009 North Korean missile test – Test-fires of Hwasong-6 and Hwasong-7.
October 12, 2009	North Korea fires five short-range missiles.
April 13, 2012	Failed launch of the Kwangmyŏngsŏng-3 satellite aboard an Unha-3 carrier rocket.
December 12, 2012	Successful launch of the Kwangmyŏngsŏng-3 Unit 2 satellite aboard a three-stage rocket
March 15, 2013	North Korea fires short-range missiles.
May 18, 2013	2013 North Korean missile tests – Test-fires of multiple missiles of unknown types, possibly KN-02 Toksa or multiple rocket launcher or anti-ship missiles.
February 27, 2014	North Korea fires four Hwasong-5 (Scud-B) short-range missiles.
March 3, 2014	North Korea fires two Hwasong-6 (Scud-C) short-range missiles.
March 4, 2014	North Korea fires three volley of rockets into Sea of Japan.
March 16, 2014	North Korea fires ten short-range missiles into Sea of Japan.
March 26, 2014	Test-fires of Hwasong-7 (Nodong). Two missiles were successfully launched.
June 26, 2014	Test-fire of a KN-02 missile.
June 29, 2014	Test-fire of two Hwasong-6 missiles.
July 9, 2014	North Korea fired two Hwasong-6 missiles.
July 13, 2014	Two Hwasong-6 missiles were launched.
July 26, 2014	Test-fire of a Hwasong-6 missile.
August 14, 2014	Test-fire of a KN-02 missile.
September 1, 2014	North Korea continued to fire a KN-02 missile.
September 6, 2014	A KN-02 missile was fired.
February 8, 2015	North Korea test-fired five projectiles: one KN-02 missile and four 300-mm guided artillery rockets.
March 1, 2015	North Korea test-fired two Hwasong-6 missiles.
April 2, 2015	North Korea test-fired a missile, assumed to be KN-02.
April 3, 2015	North Korea test-fired four missiles. These missile were also assumed to be KN-02.
May 9, 2015	North Korea claims to launch a missile, named Pukguksong-1 from a submarine.
November 28, 2015	Failed test-fire of a Pukguksong-1 missile.
December 21, 2015	Failed test-fire of a Pukguksong-1 missile. The Korean Central Television appears to doctor the launch footage.
February 7, 2016	Successful launch of the Kwangmyŏngsŏng-4 satellite.
March 10, 2016	North Korea launched two Hwasong-6 missiles.
March 18, 2016	North Korea launched two Hwasong-7 missiles. Only one missile was successfully fired, the other was failed.
March 29, 2016	North Korea launched an unidentified short-range missile. The missile hit an inland target.
April 9, 2016	Test of engine designed for an intercontinental ballistic missile.
April 15, 2016	Test-fire of a Hwasong-10 (Musudan) missile, but failed.
April 23, 2016	North Korea announced that a Pukguksong-1 missile was successfully launched.
April 28, 2016	Failed test-fires of two Hwasong-10 missiles.
May 30, 2016	North Korea tried to launch a Hwasong-10 missile but also failed.
June 22, 2016	Two Hwasong-10 missiles were launched. One was successfully tested, the other appears to be exploded midair. North Korea claimed the two test-fires to be successful.
July 9, 2016	A failed test flight of Pukguksong-1 occurred.
July 18, 2016	North Korea test-fired one Scud-type missile and two Hwasong-7 missiles.
August 3, 2016	North Korea test-fired two Hwasong-7 missiles.
August 24, 2016	North Korea claimed that a successful launch of the submarine-launched ballistic missile Pukguksong-1 was conducted. According to Kim Jong Un, it is a missile capable of striking the United States mainland and its target in Pacific.
September 5, 2016	North Korea test-fired three Hwasong-9 (Scud-ER) missiles.
October 15, 2016	Failed North Korean ballistic missile launch.
October 19, 2016	Failed launch of an intermediate-range ballistic missile.
February 11, 2017	North Korea test-fired a Pukguksong-2 missile over the Sea of Japan. This was the first launch of the new medium-range ballistic missile.
March 6, 2017	North Korea launched four Hwasong-9 missiles from the Tongchang-ri launch site in the northwest. Some flew 1,000 km (620 mi) before falling into the Sea of Japan.
April 4, 2017	North Korea test-fired a Hwasong-12 medium-range ballistic missile from its eastern port of Sinpo into the Sea of Japan. The launch failed.
April 15, 2017	North Korea test-fired a Hwasong-12 missile from the naval base in Sinpo but it exploded almost immediately after the takeoff.
April 28, 2017	North Korea test-fired a Hwasong-12 missile from Pukchang airfield. The missile exploded and broke apart minutes after liftoff.
May 14, 2017	North Korea test-fired a Hwasong-12 missile from a test site in the area of Kusong. The missile, later revealed to be an intermediate range ballistic missile, traveled 30 minutes, reached an altitude of more than 2,111.5 km, and flew a horizontal distance of 789 km (490 mi), before falling into the Sea of Japan. Such a missile would have a range of at least 4,000, reaching Guam, to 6,000 km.
May 21, 2017	North Korea test-fired another Pukguksong-2 medium-range ballistic missile from Pukchang airfield, which traveled approximately 500 km (310 mi) before falling into the Sea of Japan. The missile landed about 350 km (220 mi) from North Korea's east coast.
May 29, 2017	North Korea fired a KN-18 short range ballistic missile into the Sea of Japan. It traveled 450 km (280 mi).
June 8, 2017	North Korea fired several missiles into the Sea of Japan. They are believed to be anti-ship missiles. The South Korean military said the launches show the reclusive regime's "precise targeting capability."
June 23, 2017	North Korea tested a new rocket engine that could possibly be fitted to an intercontinental ballistic missile. This engine was later believed to be for the second stage of the Hwasong-15, first flown later in 2017.
July 4, 2017	North Korea tested its first intercontinental ballistic missile (ICBM) named Hwasong-14 on July 4. It launched from the Panghyon Aircraft Factory 8 km (5.0 mi) southeast of Panghyon Airport. It was aimed straight up at a lofted trajectory and reached more than 2,500 km into space. It landed 37 minutes later, more than 930 km from its launch site, into Japan's exclusive economic zone. Aiming long, the missile would have traveled 7,000–8,000 km or more, reaching Alaska, Hawaii, and possibly Seattle. Its operational range would be farther, bringing a 500 kg payload to targets in most of the contiguous United States 9,700 km away.
July 28, 2017	The 14th missile test carried out by North Korea in 2017 was another ICBM launched at 23:41 North Korea time (15:41 GMT) from Chagang Province in the north of the country on July 28, 2017. Los Angeles, Denver, Chicago, Boston, and New York City appear to be within range. The missile's reentry vehicle (RV) was seen by people in Japan as it entered the atmosphere and landed near the northernmost Japanese island, Hokkaido. Analysis later revealed that the RV broke up on re-entry; further testing would be required. The CIA made an assessment expecting adequate performance of the RV under the different stresses of a shallower trajectory towards the continental US.
August 26, 2017	North Korea test-fired three short-range ballistic missiles from the Kangwon Province on August 26. Two travel approximately 250 kilometers in a northeastern direction and one explodes immediately after launch.
August 29, 2017	On August 29, 2017, at 6 AM local time, North Korea launched a Hwasong-12 missile over Northern Japan. The missile's short and low trajectory and its breakup into three pieces is consistent with the failure of a heavy post-boost vehicle.
September 15, 2017	North Korea launched a Hwasong-12 missile on September 15 from Sunan airfield. It reached a height of 770 km (480 mi) and flew a distance of 3,700 km (2,300 mi) for 17 minutes over Hokkaido before landing in the Pacific.
November 28, 2017	North Korea launched a Hwasong-15 ICBM from the vicinity of Pyongsong at 3:00 am Pyongyang time. The rocket traveled for 50 minutes and reached 4,500 km (2,800 mi) in height, both of which were new milestones. The missile flew 970 km (600 mi) east into the Sea of Japan; unlike summer launches, the Japanese government did not issue cellphone alerts to warn its citizens. Its potential range appears to be more than 8,000 miles (13,000 km), able to reach Washington and the rest of the continental United States and Australia. Much about the missile is unknown. The missile might have been fitted with a mock warhead to increase its range, in which case the maximum missile range while carrying a heavy warhead might be shorter than 13,000 km. Based on satellite imagery, some experts believe that North Korea may now be able to fuel missiles horizontally, shortening the delay between when a missile becomes visible to when it can be launched. The rocket is believed to have broken up on re-entry into the atmosphere.
May 4, 2019	North Korea launched several short-range projectiles from the vicinity of Wonsan on the country's east coast, initial speculation as possibly a Russian Iskander missile which can make course corrections during its flight. Later designated as KN-23 and in 2023, the official name was revealed as Hwasong-11A.
May 9, 2019	North Korea launched two Hwasong-11A missiles from the vicinity of Sino-ri in North Pyongan Province (launch area also, in another source, identified as Kusong) at 4:29 p.m. and 4:49 p.m. local time.
July 25, 2019	North Korea launched two Hwasong-11A short-range ballistic missiles. Demonstrated maximum range is 690 km.
July 31, 2019	North Korea launched "several" short-range ballistic missiles.
August 2, 2019	North Korea launched two short-range ballistic missiles at 2:59 a.m. and 3:23 a.m. local time.
August 24, 2019	North Korea launched two short-range ballistic missiles from Sondok in South Hamgyong Province. Both fell in the Sea of Japan.
September 10, 2019	North Korea launched two short-range projectiles from Kaechon shortly after proposing to resume denuclearization negotiations with the US. Both the projectiles fell into the sea off the North's east coast.
October 2, 2019	North Korea test-fired a new-type submarine-launched ballistic missile (SLBM) in the waters off Wonsan. The Republic of Korea Armed Forces said the missile, which was dubbed Pukguksong-3, flew about 450 kilometers and reached a maximum altitude of 910 kilometers, making it an intermediate-range ballistic missile. It fell into the exclusive economic zone of Japan off Shimane Prefecture. North Korea said the launch was successful.
October 31, 2019	North Korea test-fired two short-range projectiles from Sunchon at 4:35 p.m. and 4:38 p.m. Both flew around 370 km and reached a maximum altitude of 90 km before falling in the Sea of Japan.
November 28, 2019	North Korea test-launched two "short-range projectiles". Rocket exhaust was visible from Russia.
March 2, 2020	North Korea carried out test-launch of two unidentified projectiles from eastwards over the sea from the Wonsan area on the east coast. Projectiles are equipped with an operational range of 240 kilometres, and capable to flew a height of 35 kilometres.
March 25, 2021	Further information: 2021–2023 North Korean missile tests North Korea carried out test-launch of two upgraded Hwasong-11A (KN-23) short-range ballistic missiles carrying a 2.5-tonne live warhead each that correctly hit the simulated targets. While North Korea official statement reported a 600 km range, Japanese and South Korean sources reported that the missiles flew just over 400 km. Later, the South Korean Joint Chiefs of Staff revised their range assessment of new North Korean missile to 600 km and the Defense Minister said that blind spots due to earth curvature led to initial estimate of 450 km. Later, the missiles were identified as Hwasong-11C.
September 11, 2021	North Korea carried out tests of a new long-range cruise missile on 11 and 12 September 2021, according to the KCNA. The missiles flew for 1,500 kilometres and successfully hit their target in North Korea's waters, and were meant for a "strategic role" according to the news agency, which analyst Ankit Panda stated was a common euphemism for a missile capable of carrying nuclear warheads.
September 15, 2021	North Korea fired two unidentified ballistic missiles towards the Sea of Japan. Japan's Ministry of Defense stated that they had landed in the country's exclusive economic zone. The South Korean Joint Chiefs of Staff reported that the missiles flew for 800 kilometres, while reaching an altitude of 60 kilometres, and were fired from Yangdok County. KCNA later stated that they were part of a railway-borne missile system.
September 28, 2021	A short-range missile was fired by North Korea towards the Sea of Japan from Chagang Province, according to South Korean officials. The Japanese government meanwhile suspected it to be a ballistic missile. Rodong Sinmun stated that North Korea had tested a new hypersonic missile called Hwasong-8 and it was launched from Toyang-ri in Ryongrim County. The test, including that of its gliding warhead, was a success according to the state media, which also called it a weapon of "great strategic significance".
September 30, 2021	KCNA stated that North Korea had successfully tested a new anti-aircraft missile. It added that the missile contained the new technologies of twin-rudder control and double-impulse flight engine.
October 19, 2021	South Korea JCS announced that a ballistic missile was fired from Sinpo at 10:17am; JoongAng Ilbo claims that the missile fired was a SLBM. Rodong Sinmun reported on the launch on 20 October, revealing that it was a new SLBM launched from a Sinpo-class submarine named 'Hero 8.24'. The new missile features advanced guidance technologies, and can conduct 'pull-up' manoeuvres. Later, the missile was identified as Hwasong-11S.
January 5, 2022	North Korea test-fired a hypersonic missile, in the first major weapons test by the nation in 2022 and claimed the same as "The successive successes" in the test launches.
January 10, 2022	North Korea test fired the second ballistic missile of the year, likely a Hwasong-8 missile. It is claimed that it had a detached hypersonic glide vehicle (HGV). The missile hit its target in Sea of Japan. The missile reached speeds of Mach 10 as per South Korea's Joint Chiefs (JCS), however the JCS have so far refused to confirm that the missile is an actual hypersonic glide vehicle (HGV). The missile reached a range of 700 km or 434.96 miles and an apogee of 60 km or 37.3 miles. NORAD and the FAA also reacted to this launch by grounding West coast airplanes up to Portland for 5 to 7 minutes, the FAA gave no official reason for these delays, likely so NORAD could try to intercept the missile if it went towards the US. This US military reaction seems to indicate that North Korea does indeed possess rudimentary hypersonic vehicle capabilities.
January 15, 2022	North Korea test-fired two Hwasong-11A (KN-23) short range missiles from two separate trains in a short notice mission. The drill was meant to test the response time and alert posture of the country's new railway-borne missile regiment. This was the second reported railway-based missile test since its first launch in September 15 of 2021. The missiles hit its target in the Sea of Japan. The missile reached a range of 430 km (270 mi) and an apogee of 36 km (22 mi) and a top speed of Mach 6 (7,350kmph). Due to the successful nature of the tests it was claimed by North Korea's State media that the railway-borne missile capabilities will be expanded across the country.
January 25, 2022	North Korea test-launched two long-range cruise missiles to the dummy target, 1,800 km (1,100 mi) away at an average speed of Mach 1.47 (720 km/h (450 mph).
January 30, 2022	North Korea launched an Intermediate Range Ballistic Missile (IRBM) Hwasong-12 missile. The missile was fired at a lower apogee thereby limiting its true range, the missile reached a height of 2,000 km (1,200 mi) and reached a range of 800 kilometers (500 miles) where it fell into the exclusive economic zone of the Korean peninsula in the Sea of Japan. The launch was the seventh test in the month and the second IRBM since the November 2017 test.
February 27, 2022	North Korea launched a ballistic missile towards the Sea of Japan. The missile reached a height of 600 km (370 mi) and reached a range of 300 km (190 mi), detected in the Sunan area. North Korea resumed the test-launch spree after a break of 28 days.
March 5, 2022	North Korea test launched its Hwasong-17 ICBM system, albeit with a reduced capability or range.
March 16, 2022	North Korea attempted to test-fire a projectile alleged to be an ICBM according to NHK, Japan citing a source in Ministry of Defense (Japan). The rocket broke up soon after liftoff.
March 24, 2022	North Korea conducted its first successful ICBM launch in over four years. The ICBM launched with a distance of 1080 km and an altitude of 6000 km, suggesting an ability to reach the entire continental United States. North Korea claimed the ICBM was the new Hwasong-17; some analysts believe the launch was in fact a smaller 2017 Hwasong-15 ICBM, and that in order to allow it to travel farther it had been stripped of any significant payload.
April 16, 2022	North Korea test launched two short-range tactical devices towards east coast which reached a height of 24 km (15 mi) and reached a range of 112 km (70 mi). The missiles were later identified to be Hwasong-11D.
May 4, 2022	North Korea launched a ballistic missile into the sea outside of Japan's Exclusive Economic Zone. The missile travelled a distance of 500 km with an altitude of 800 km.
May 7, 2022	North Korea launched a short-range ballistic missile, probably from a submarine, with a 600 km trajectory and an altitude around 60 km. The missile landed in the Sea of Japan.
May 12, 2022	According to South Korea, North Korea launched three short-range ballistic missiles.
May 25, 2022	According to South Korea, North Korea launched an ICBM and two other missiles.
June 5, 2022	North Korea launched eight short-range ballistic missiles. According to Japan, at least one missile had a variable trajectory.
August 17, 2022	North Korea reportedly fired two cruise missiles into the sea, in its first cruise missile testing since January. Unlike ballistic missile tests, cruise missile tests are not forbidden by the UN sanctions against North Korea.
September 25, 2022	North Korea fired a ballistic missile into its eastern sea, South Korea's military said. The test came shortly after the US nuclear-powered aircraft carrier USS Ronald Reagan, and its strike group arrived in South Korea for joint military exercises.
September 28, 2022	North Korea fired two missiles, reportedly on irregular trajectories.
September 29, 2022	North Korea fired at least one missile.
October 1, 2022	North Korea fired ballistic missiles.
October 4, 2022	North Korea launched an IRBM that flew over and past Japan, landing in the Sea of Japan without incident.
October 6, 2022	North Korea fired ballistic missiles.
October 9, 2022	North Korea fired two ballistic missiles.
October 12, 2022	North Korea fired two long-range cruise missiles, each of which travelled 2,000 kilometres (1,200 mi), and were reported to have hit their targets.
October 14, 2022	North Korea launched a short-range ballistic missile, towards its eastern waters.
October 28, 2022	North Korea was reported to have launched a ballistic missile off its east coast.
November 2, 2022	North Korea reportedly fired 23 missiles of various types—the most in a single day—including a ballistic missile that landed in international waters 167 kilometers off Ulleung island, triggering air raid sirens there.
November 3, 2022	North Korea reportedly fired three ballistic missiles—one long-range and two short range—off its east coast, including one that flew near Japan.
November 5, 2022	North Korea reportedly fired four short-range ballistic missiles into the western sea. The South Korean military said that the missiles travelled around 130 kilometres (81 mi) at an altitude of around 20 kilometres (12 mi).
November 8, 2022	North Korea reportedly fired at least one ballistic missile into the sea on Wednesday, and South Korea said it had identified debris from an earlier launch as part of a Soviet-era SA-5 surface-to-air missile.
November 18, 2022	North Korea reportedly fired at least one ballistic missile into the sea on Friday, believed to be the first successful full flight of its Hwasong-17. The missile landed in Japan's exclusive economic zone.
December 18, 2022	North Korea reportedly fired two medium-range ballistic missiles.
December 23, 2022	North Korea reportedly fired two short-range ballistic missiles.
December 31, 2022	North Korea reportedly fired three short-range ballistic missiles, flying approximately 350 kilometres (220 mi).
February 18, 2023	North Korea fired a Hwasong-15 ICBM.
February 20, 2023	North Korea launched two ballistic missiles.
February 24, 2023	North Korea fired four Hwasal-2 strategic cruise missiles off the east coast of the Korean Peninsula.
March–December 2023	Further information: 2021–2023 North Korean missile tests § 2023 North Korea fired over a dozen missiles throughout March 2023, and conducted a missile test in April and also in July. On 21 November 2023, a Chŏllima 1 rocket carrying a Malligyong-1 reconnaissance satellite was launched from the Sohae Satellite Launching Station, with North Korean leader Kim Jong Un present. It is not known if the satellite achieve orbit or what territory it overflew. On 18 December, the country reportedly fired its most advanced missile to date: an intercontinental ballistic missile which travelled for 73 minutes for a distance of about 1,000km (621 miles).
January 14, 2024	North Korea fired a ballistic missile, later determined to be an IRBM, possibly named Hwasong-16A.
April 2, 2024	North Korea fired a ballistic missile, later determined to be Hwasong-16B.
June 27, 2024	North Korea claims successful developmental test of multiple warhead-armed missile.
September 18, 2024	North Korea fired multiple short-range ballistic missiles that traveled at distance of about 400 km.
October 31, 2024	North Korea tested an intercontinental ballistic missile.
January 6, 2025	North Korea launched Hwasong-16B hypersonic IRBM.
March 10, 2025	North Korea fired missiles to Yellow Sea.
May 7, 2025	North Korea fired short-range missiles that flew up to 800 km (497 miles).
October 22, 2025	North Korea fired two hypersonic missiles.
April 19, 2026	North Korea fired five Hwasongpho-11 Ra surface-to-surface tactical ballistic missiles.
October 3, 2026	North Korea fired missile from Sangum-ri (Korean: 상음리) in Anbyon County

North Korean rockets flown over the Japanese archipelago
No.	Date	Model	Area flown over	Advance notice	North Korean claim	Satellite name
1	31 August 1998	Taepodong-1	Akita	No	Satellite launch	Kwangmyŏngsŏng-1
2	5 April 2009	Unha-2	Akita, Iwate	Yes	Satellite launch	Kwangmyŏngsŏng-2
3	12 December 2012	Unha-3	Okinawa	Yes	Satellite launch	Kwangmyŏngsŏng-3
4	7 February 2016	Kwangmyŏngsŏng (Unha-3)	Okinawa	Yes	Satellite launch	Kwangmyŏngsŏng-4
5	29 August 2017	Hwasong-12	Hokkaido	No	Missile launch	N/A
6	15 September 2017	Hwasong-12	Hokkaido	No	Missile launch	N/A
7	4 October 2022	Hwasong-12 modified	Aomori	No	Missile launch	

Number of missiles launched by North Korea per year since 1993 (as of 18 November 2022)

View source data.

Trajectories of North Korean missiles launched over Japan 1998-2017

Range and altitude of North Korean missiles launched over Japan

== Events related to missile tests ==
=== 2016 ===
On February 7, 2016, roughly a month after an alleged hydrogen bomb test, North Korea claimed to have put a satellite into low Earth orbit. Japanese Prime Minister Shinzō Abe had warned the North to not launch the rocket, and if it did and the rocket violated Japanese territory, it would be shot down. North Korea launched the rocket anyway, claiming the satellite was purely intended for peaceful, scientific purposes. Several nations, including the United States, Japan, and South Korea, have criticized the launch, and despite North Korean claims that the rocket was for peaceful purposes, it has been heavily criticized as an attempt to perform an ICBM test under the guise of a peaceful satellite launch. China also criticized the launch, however urged "the relevant parties" to "refrain from taking actions that may further escalate tensions on the Korean peninsula".

While some North Korean pronouncements have been treated with skepticism and ridicule, analysts treated the unusual pace of North Korean rocket and nuclear testing in early 2016 quite seriously. Admiral Bill Gortney, head of the North American Aerospace Defense Command, told Congress in March 2016, "It's the prudent decision on my part to assume that [Kim Jong Un] has the capability to miniaturize a nuclear weapon and put it on an ICBM," suggesting a major shift from a few years earlier.

North Korea appeared to launch a missile test from a submarine on April 23, 2016; while the missile only traveled 30 km, one U.S. analyst noted that "North Korea's sub launch capability has gone from a joke to something very serious". North Korea conducted multiple missile tests in 2016.

=== 2017 ===
In early August 2017, North Korea threatened to attack Guam using four Hwasong-12 missiles. These missiles were planned to overfly Japan.

On August 29, 2017, United Nations Secretary-General António Guterres has condemned the latest North Korea Ballistic Missile Launch and termed it as violation of relevant UN Security Council resolutions, as according to press reports, early Tuesday morning, the North Korea Ballistic Missile travelled some 2,700 kilometers, flying over Japan before crashing into the Pacific Ocean.

On September 3, 2017, North Korea claimed to have successfully tested a thermonuclear bomb, also known as a hydrogen bomb (see 2017 North Korean nuclear test). Corresponding seismic activity similar to an earthquake of magnitude 6.3 was reported by the USGS making the blast around 10 times more powerful than previous detonations by the country. Later the bomb yield was estimated to be 250 kilotons, based on further study of the seismic data. The test was reported to be "a perfect success".

=== 2018 ===
Indonesian authorities detained the North Korean's second-largest cargo ship, the Wise Honest, in April for having been photographed loading what appeared to be coal in North Korea. The ship's automatic identification system signal had been turned off since August 2017, trying to conceal its course. In July 2018 the U.S. Justice Department secured a sealed seizure warrant for the ship.

=== 2019 ===
The U.S. seized the Wise Honest in Indonesia under its warrant in May and put it under tow to American Samoa. The Justice Department said it was the first time the United States had seized a North Korean cargo vessel for international sanctions violations. The sanctions are intended "ultimately [to] pressure North Korea to dismantle its nuclear program".

Members of the UN Security Council (UNSC), including UK and France, condemned North Korea's recent missile launches. The nations urged Pyongyang to resume negotiations, citing the missile launches as violation of UNSC resolutions.

On October 2, North Korea confirmed testing a new ballistic missile launched from a submarine, and called it a "significant achievement" towards dealing with external threats and boosting its military power.

In December, Planet Labs released new satellite images of a factory unit where North Korea develops military equipment used in launching long-range missiles, indicating the construction of a new arrangement. The revelation has raised fear that North Korea might launch a rocket or missile to seek concessions in stagnant nuclear negotiations with the U.S.

=== 2020 ===
The Vice Chairman of the Joint Chiefs of Staff, General John Hyten, said on January 17 that North Korea is building new missiles, capabilities and weapons "As fast as anybody on the planet." He further stated that North Korea is learning from its mistakes while making advances in its missile programs. However, Under Secretary of Defense for Policy John Rood later told the House Armed Forces Committee on January 28 that North Korea did not go through with conducting a major missile launch which had been scheduled to take place sometime between late December and early January.

=== 2021 ===
North Korea conducted eight missile tests in 2021, compared with four missile tests in 2020.

=== 2022 ===
A ballistic missile was launched by North Korea on January 5, 2022, off its east coast, as per military officials in Seoul and Japan. The exact munition used for the testing remains unclear. However, the officials did cite the munition as a short-range projectile, which was presumed as a ballistic missile launched from an inland region into the Sea of Japan. Officials claimed to be maintaining "readiness posture" and close monitoring of the situation with its defense allies in the US.

North Korea's 11th missile launch of 2022 was its March 24 launch of an ICBM, marking its first successful ICBM launch since 2017.

According to Japanese Minister of Defense Nobuo Kishi, one or more missiles from North Korea's June 5, 2022 launch had a variable trajectory presumably designed to evade missile defenses.

On October 4, 2022, North Korea launched a missile that flew over and past Japan, prompting Japanese prime minister Fumio Kishida to release an announcement warning citizens to take shelter and other precautionary measures. The missile, likely another ICBM, is said to have landed in the Sea of Japan without incident.

In early October 2022, the U.S. called an emergency UN Security Council meeting, at which it accused Russia and China of protecting the North from stronger sanctions. It also extended its naval drills alongside Japan and South Korea, redeploying the USS Ronald Reagan aircraft carrier.

The same day as the October 14 missile test saw the firing of hundreds of North Korean artillery shells into maritime buffer zones, North Korea's third violation of the buffer zones established by the Pyongyang Joint Declaration of September 2018.

On 2 November 2022, North Korea was reported to have launched 23 missiles of various types. At the same time, more than 100 artillery rounds were fired and again violated the buffer zones established by the 2018 agreement. In response to the missile launches, air raid sirens were activated on Ulleung island, and three AGM-84H/K SLAM-ER missiles were fired by South Korean warplanes.

On 3 November 2022, North Korea reportedly fired at least one ballistic missile off its east coast, including one, believed to be a long-range missile, that flew over and past Japan. The launch triggered the Japanese emergency broadcast system, which alerted residents in the prefectures of Miyagi, Yamagata, and Niigata to stay indoors.

=== 2023 ===
On 19 November 2023, ROK Defense Minister Shin Won-sik informed the Korean Broadcasting System that an anticipated third satellite launch by North Korea was expected by the end of that month. On the evening of 21 November 2023, North Korea’s state-run Korean Central News Agency (KCNA) that a Chŏllima 1 rocket carrying a Malligyong-1 reconnaissance satellite was launched from the Sohae Satellite Launching Station, with North Korean leader Kim Jong Un present. On 23 November 2023, North Korea terminated the bi-lateral 2018 Comprehensive Military Agreement in response to South Korea’s decision to suspend a part of that agreement in reaction to North Korea’s latest satellite launch.

=== 2024 ===
In October 2024 North Korean leader Kim Jong Un visited missile bases to inspect their readiness for "strategic deterrence" actions. During his visit, Kim emphasized that U.S. nuclear capabilities pose a growing threat to North Korea. In response to perceived external threats, North Korea has intensified the development of its ballistic missile program and nuclear arsenal. These actions have drawn widespread international condemnation and led to the imposition of additional sanctions aimed at curbing the country's military advancements.

In January 2025, response to joint U.S.-South Korean military drills, North Korea carried out a cruise missile test, emphasizing its commitment to strong counteractions. At the same time, President Trump signalled his intention to reopen diplomatic discussions with Kim Jong Un.

=== 2025 ===
On November 7, 2025, reports from both South Korea and Japan identified North Korea for launching a ballistic missile in the direction of Japanese territory.

=== 2026 ===
On January 4, 2026, at around 7:50 AM, South Korea reported that several ballistic missiles were launched towards the Sea of Japan.

On October 29, 2026, at around 12:30 PM, North Korea fired around 10 ballistic missiles from Wonsan on North Korea's eastern coast.

== See also ==
- DPRK Missile Administration
- Foreign relations of North Korea
- North Korea–United States relations
- Korean People's Army
- Korean People's Army Strategic Force
- Korean War
- Kwangmyŏngsŏng program — North Korea's satellite launch program and covert testing of ICBM technology
- North Korea and weapons of mass destruction
