= Syed Ali Nawab =

Pakistani general

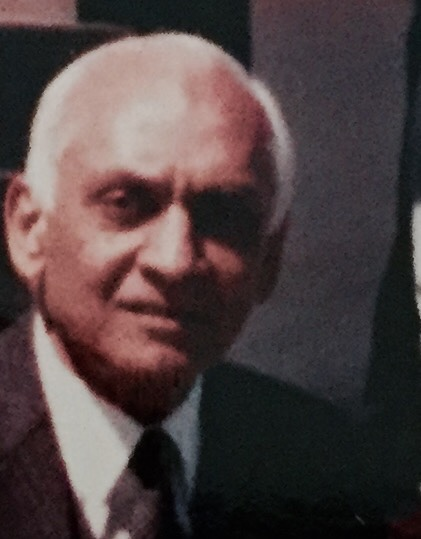
- Nawab c. 1980s
- Born: Syed Ali Nawab; 6 October 1925; Badaun, Uttar Pradesh, British India
- Died: 22 February 1994 (aged 68); Islamabad
- Military career
- Allegiance: Pakistan
- Branch: Pakistan Army
- Service years: 1951–1983
- Rank: Major-General
- Nicknames: Anis Nawab; Ali Nawab; Anis Ali Syed
- Unit: Pakistan Army Corps of EME
- Commands: Pakistan Ordnance Factories; DG Corps of EME
- Conflicts: Indo-Pakistani War of 1965; Indo-Pakistani War of 1971
- Awards: Hilal-i-Imtiaz (military) 1979; Sitara-e-Basalat; Tamgha-i-Pakistan
- Other work: Consultant for Pakistan Government.

Syed Ali Nawab (Urdu: سید علی نواب; b. 6 October 1925–22 February 1994) (HI (m) 1979, SBt, TPk, PE) was an engineering officer in the Pakistan Army Corps of EME, and a mechanical engineer with an MIMechE from the UK and two bachelor's degrees, one in Electrical Engineering, and the other in Physics, Chemistry and Mathematics from Aligarh Muslim University (AMU). He was known for his classified works in the development of the atomic bomb at PAEC and the Engineering Research Laboratories (ERL) in the 1970s.

In 1979, in recognition of Nawab's contributions, as head of the nuclear weapons program, Ghulam Ishaq Khan recommended Nawab for the highly prestigious Hilal e Imtiaz (Military) solid gold medal that, in its original format, conferred upon the recipient, allotments of residential as well as valuable irrigated agricultural lands reserved for recipients of gallantry awards and heroes of Pakistan. The first Hilal-e-Imtiaz (Military) in Pakistan's history was awarded to 4-star General Zia ul Haq after he was appointed Chief of the Pakistan Army by Prime Minister Z A Bhutto in 1976. Three years later, 4-star Admiral of the Navy Mohammad Shariff and Nawab also became recipients of this highly prestigious and financially attractive award. Since all recipients prior to 1980 except Nawab had been 4-star General officers, Nawab was a member of a small but very influential, elite group of officers in Pakistan at the time. After 1979, the medal was no longer reserved for military officers directly reporting to the Defense Secretary General of Pakistan. Accordingly, the military medal's format was changed by President General Zia ul Haq to a gold-plated, largely ceremonial award, given without all the expensive irrigated land allotments reserved for recipients of gallantry awards and heroes of Pakistan that accompanied the original medal.

His engineering career is associated with research work at Engineering Research Laboratories (ERL), including the operations of computer numerical control (CNC) machines that he worked on throughout his career. Earlier in his career, he was posted twice as the military liaison officer at the High Commission of Pakistan in London in the United Kingdom, to the British Army. Later, as a General officer in the Pakistan Army, he used his knowledge of engineering and connections developed during his stay in Britain to establish a network and enable the import of critical engineering hardware, equipment and supplies from Europe that were used at ERL.

Among his colleagues at Khan Research Laboratories (KRL), he had a reputation for being a qualified machinist and a competent engineer who sought quick solutions. Later, he worked as a consultant engineer on electric power production and quality assurance at the Ministry of Defense Production of the Government of Pakistan for many years.

== Biography ==
=== Early life and career in military ===
Syed Ali Nawab was born in Budaun, Uttar Pradesh in British India, into an Urdu-speaking family on 6 October 1925. Nawab attended Aligarh Muslim University (AMU) after his matriculation in 1941–43. He initially studied physics and graduated with BSc in physics in 1946, before attending the engineering college. In 1948, he graduated with B.S. in electrical engineering, and emigrated to Pakistan in 1948– he went to attend the Pakistan Military Academy (PMA) in Kakul, graduating top of his class of engineering.

In 1949, Nawab was commissioned in the Pakistan Army's Corps of Electrical and Mechanical Engineering (PEME) and was one of few army officers directed by the Pakistani military to attend Loughborough University where he gained a diploma in mechanical engineering in 1951. From 1951 to 1952 he trained in UK at workshops in Aldershot, Woolich, Ashford, Sterling, Borden and Arborfield. He then passed the exam for "MIMechE:" at the Institution of Mechanical Engineers (IMechE) in the United Kingdom.

Upon returning to Pakistan in 1954, Major Nawab was appointed inspector of vehicle and engineering equipment in the Pakistan Army, having responsibility for quality inspection and equipment for military vehicles. Later in 1955–56, Major Nawab was posted to Army GHQ as a controller of inspection and technical development.

In 1954–56, Major Nawab was directed to attend the Royal Military College of Science in Shrivenham in England to study machine design components on the military vehicles. Then in 1960, Nawab was sent to attend the Aberdeen Proving Ground, United States Army facility, located in Maryland. At Aberdeen Proving Ground in Maryland, Major Nawab attended the Ordnance Officer Career Course in the US Army Ordnance School and qualified as an ordnance specialist.

In 1960–64, Lieutenant-Colonel Nawab was appointed assistant director of the EME directorate at Army GHQ. In 1961 he completed training at US Army's Management Engineering Training Agency at Rock Island Illinois.

In 1965, Lt-Col. Nawab participated in the second war with India, responsible for managing military ordnance and inspections of the military vehicles.

In 1965, Colonel Nawab was directed by the Minister of Defence (MoD) to join the staff of the High Commission of Pakistan in London as a military liaison officer to the British Army. Col. Nawab served in this assignment until 1971 after which he returned to his country to participate in the third war with India.

=== Postwar career ===
In 1974, Nawab was promoted by Prime Minister Bhutto to two-star or Major General. As such, he became the ranking officer of the EME Corps.

Nawab's first appointment as a Major General was in the Ministry of Defense, where he worked directly with the Secretary of Defense, Mr. Ghulam Ishaq Khan, who was running Pakistan's nuclear weapons program. Nawab was later transferred as Director General Corps of Electrical and Mechanical Engineering (EME) from 6 May 1976 until 6 December 1976. by Defence Secretary Ghulam Ishaq Khan to supervise the establishment of Engineering Research Laboratories (ERL); and for procuring metallurgical equipment, elemental ores, and metalworking that was crucial for scientific and research work at the ERL.

As DG EME Nawab used his British connections to the British Ministry of Defence to import and procure industrial equipment and the computerized numerical control machines from the United Kingdom that were installed in the ERL.

At ERL, Nawab established the machine shop. He was noted among the civilian scientists as a competent mechanical engineer and able machinist, while working on machine design and components that were crucial for the feasibility of gas centrifuges, where Nawab designed and built the machine components using the lathe, drill press, bandsaw, and the CNC machines. Major-General Nawab officiated his role towards establishing the engineering branch at the KRL as a senior engineer and researcher while partially completing the engineering staffing composed of EME army officers.

Major-General Nawab also used his influence as DG EME in carefully selecting and deputing EME officers posted as military liaison officers and staff at the Office of Military Procurement (PALTO) that was used by ERL at the High Commission of Pakistan in the United Kingdom. All this was done clandestinely, without Dr A.Q. Khan knowing that Nawab was actually DG EME to maintain deniability. Brigadier Islamullah Khan, who incognito represented himself as DG EME to Dr. A Q Khan assisted in maintaining the clandestine aspect of this operation and in building ERL. Brigadier Islamullah Khan, as well as other EME officers who assisted in the operation, was recommended by Nawab and later promoted to the rank of Major General.

In 1977, Major General Nawab was appointed as the Chairman of Ordnance Factories (POF) in Wah, from where he assisted ERL as well as PAEC's Munir Ahmad Khan with international equipment procurement, facilities establishment, manpower, and management expertise at WGS (Wah Group Scientists), Acid Plant, MDX Plant etc. COAS General Zia was instructed by Secretary Defence, Ghulam Ishaq Khan to recommend this transfer. Nawab used his appointment at POFs to make additional personnel allocations to ERL and to procure ores of uranium in the country and relocate them to a secure location for the expansion of nuclear infrastructure.

In 1978, during General Zia's military regime, Major General Nawab was superseded as junior officers were promoted to higher ranks. This was unsurprising since Prime Minister Bhutto and General Tikka Khan who had promoted Nawab to General officer rank were both jailed after the military coup by General Zia; and Nawab's boss, Defense Secretary Ghulam Ishaq Khan was transferred out of the Ministry of Defense to the Ministry of Finance. Subsequently, however, Ghulam Ishaq Khan brought General Zia up to speed on details of Nawab's role in the ERL project and convinced Zia to give Nawab an extension as well as award him the original Hilal-e-Imtiaz Military in 1979 with all its accompanying, valuable land allocations reserved for heroes of Pakistan. Immediately after this medal was awarded to Nawab, the format of the medal was changed by General Zia to a gold plated ceremonial award, given without all the expensive irrigated agricultural land allocations, reserved for heroes of Pakistan. This prevented arousing suspicion and attracting unwarranted attention to these generous land allocations made by the state of Pakistan to Nawab.

In 1981, Major-General Nawab again provided a crucial technical support when he assisted the KRL scientists in redesigning, and eventually machining of the gyrational beds and bearing components of the gas centrifuges with the goal of developing powerful and effective methods of gaseous method that were employed in the uranium enrichment.

== Later life ==
In 1981, Major-General Nawb was again posted by the Ministry of Defence as the military liaison officer at the High Commission of Pakistan in the United Kingdom, working closely with maintaining the Pakistan Army's military relations with British Army. His assignment did not last long, and he eventually decided to seek retirement from his military service with the Army in 1983.

After his retirement, Nawab founded the small engineering consulting firm, the Experts Advisory Cell (EAC), where he worked for the Government of Pakistan as a consultant engineer to advise and monitor state-owned enterprises. Later, he became involved in consulting on the electricity manufacturing and electric power production to the Ministry of Industries and Production. He also co-authored a paper while consulting on the industrial nuclear power generation to the Ministry of Finance as he opined: "Evaluating Public Manufacturing Enterprises: An experimental monitoring system". In addition, the contributions of Nawab's and his firm, the EAC, to industrialization of Pakistan were recognized by the World Bank and IMF in the 1983 World Development Report.

He later consulted the Ministry of Defence Production on product safety and quality assurance for many years, until living a quiet life in Karachi in 1990.

On 22 February 1994, Nawab died at his estate in Karachi, and was buried in Military Cemetery in DHA Society in Karachi, Sindh, Pakistan. For many years, Nawab's work and role at the KRL was not known to the public, and details of his work were kept well hidden until the memoirs were published by AQ Khan in 2009.

According to the various admissions, Nawab often used the codenames Anis Ali Syed and Anis Nawab to hide his identity while working on classified works at the ERL. For example, when he reportedly met with journalist Peter Griffin to discuss the issue of industrialization in Pakistan. Also in Chapter 9, on page 64, in the book “Last Days of Bhutto” by Kausar Niazy

== See also ==
- Pakistan Army
- Army engineer
