= Ghauri-III =

Cancelled Intermediate-range ballistic missile project

- Type: IRBM
- Place of origin: Pakistan

Production history
- Designer: Khan Research Laboratories (KRL)
- Designed: 2003–2004

Specifications (Technical data)
- Maximum firing range: 3,500 km (2,200 mi)
- Warhead: HE/NE
- Engine: Two-stage
- Propellant: Liquid-propellant
- Guidance system: Inertial, Terminal
- Launch platform: Launch pad

The Ghauri-III (Urdu: غورى–ااا) was the codename of a rocket program aimed at developing land-based intermediate-range ballistic missile to fulfill Pakistan's objective of attaining a ground-based second-strike capability.

Development of the Ghauri-III commenced in 1999 with a planned operational range of 3,000 kilometers (1,900 miles). Led by the Kahuta Research Laboratories (KRL), the program featured a unique design. However, it remained in the design phases and was eventually scaled down, ultimately leading to its complete termination in 2005.

== Background ==
Range of the Ghauri-III

Development of the Ghauri-III, aimed at achieving ground-based second-strike capability, commenced in 1999 with the Khan Research Laboratories (KRL) spearheading the rocketry program. Its propellant technology drew influence from the Nodong-1 of North Korea, knowledge of which Pakistan acquired between 1993 and 1995. The Ghauri program operated concurrently with the Shaheen program, both striving to achieve second-strike capability, with ranges extending as far as eastern India.

In 1999, the Khan Research Laboratories (KRL) concluded numerous trials for its designed rocket engine and progressed towards warhead designs. However, without the contribution from North Korea, the Ghauri-III program encountered numerous setbacks and costly trial-and-error processes to make it feasible. Delays in developing an indigenous liquid-fuel propellant further hindered the program's progress, placing it behind in competition with the Shaheen program. Despite successful rocket engine testing, no further tests were conducted, despite numerous rumors suggesting otherwise.

In 2011, the chief designer Abdul Qadeer Khan testified to the existence of the Ghauri-III program in an article published in The News International. Subsequently, in 2012, its existence was officially acknowledged by Pakistani government officials, who cited the program's cancellation due to the Khan Research Laboratories (KRL) inability to render it feasible within the designated timeframe, in contrast to the successful production of the Shaheen-III under the Shaheen program in 2015.

== See also ==
- Ballistic missile
- Liquid fuel rocket

Related developments

- Ghauri (missile)
- Ghauri-II
- Shaheen-III

Related lists

- List of missiles of Pakistan
