= Ghauri-II =

Pakistani medium-range ballistic missile

- Type: MRBM
- Place of origin: Pakistan

Service history
- In service: 2004–present (Not currently deployed)
- Used by: Pakistan Army (Army Strategic Forces Command)

Production history
- Designer: Khan Research Laboratories (KRL)
- Designed: 1993–2003
- Manufacturer: Khan Research Laboratories
- Variants: Ghauri-III

Specifications (Technical data)
- Length: 26 m (85 ft)
- Diameter: 2.0 m (6.6 ft)
- Maximum firing range: 2,000 km (1,200 mi)
- Warhead: HE/NE
- Warhead weight: 1,500 kg (3,300 lb)
- Engine: Two-stage
- Transmission: Manual
- Suspension: Atego x 8WD semi-trailer
- Propellant: Liquid-propellant
- Operational range: 1,800–2,000 kilometres (1,100–1,200 mi)
- Flight altitude: 612 mi (985 km), reached in first test flight
- Guidance system: Inertial, Terminal
- Launch platform: Launch pad

The Ghauri-II (Urdu: غوری-اا) is a land-based medium range guided ballistic missile designed and developed by the Khan Research Laboratories.

Developed in response to India's Agni-II, its propellant technology is influenced from the Nodong-1 of North Korea.

Only two tests of Ghauri-II were conducted in 1999 and in 2004, but no military designation for deployment was ever assigned by the Pakistani military.

== Development background ==
The Ghauri program was developed alongside the Shaheen program with a need to attained the ground-based second strike capability in an event of Pakistan's military losing ground against the Indian Army. In response to Agni-II deployment, Ghauri-II received much support but its technological influence comes from the Nodong-1 of North Korea.

Design development began in 1993 but the Ghauri-II program suffered with many setbacks and expensive trial and errors to meet Pakistan's survivability goals with Sharif administration terminating North Korean connections to favor its relations with Japan and the United States.

It took several years for Khan Research Laboratories (KRL) to undertake the design, engineering, metallurgical analysis, development of onboard computers, and programming, culminating in the complete assembly of the Ghauri-II missile in 2000.

=== Technical design ===
The Ghauri-II design developed from Ghauri with propellant technology influenced from the Nodong-1. Collaborating with other defense contractors, the Ghauri-II is a two-stage system with its motor length is increased to 2.0 m (6.6 ft), allowing the rocket to afterburn for a longer time and extended range. Material selections for warhead design and assembly also featured using the high-strength aluminum against high-strength low-alloy steel. The Ghauri-II is designed for maximum operating range of 2,000 km (1,200 mi), respectively. Data provided by American-based Center for Strategic and International Studies (CSIS), Ghauri-II is about 18.0 m (59.1 ft) in length, has a diameter of 1.35 m (53 in) with a launch weight of 1,800 kg (4,000 lb).

=== Operational testing ===
The Ghauri-II took its first flight in space in 1999; it flown more than 620 mi (1,000 km) in 12 minutes after being fired from Mashhood Test Firing Range of Pakistan Army. The launch was in response to India's Agni-II that also took place in 1999.

After several years of gap, the Ghauri-II was last test fired in 2004 and enjoyed its distinction of being the longest range missile in service with Pakistan military, until its limit was exceeded by the successful launch of the Shaheen-II, also in 2004.

Since 2004, no further tests have been conducted, nor has it been deployed with unique military identification.

== See also ==
- Ballistic missile
- Liquid fuel rocket

Related developments

- Ghauri (missile)
- Ghauri-III
