= Bachelle Electric =

Defunct American motor vehicle manufacturer

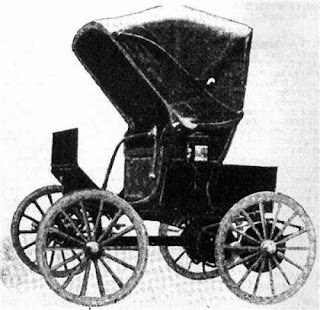
1900 Bachelle Electric

The Bachelle Automobile company was an electric automobile company from Chicago, Illinois.

In fall of 1900, a man named Otto von Bachelle (a noted electrical engineer) made his first electric car. It was a small, compact car, only produced in small numbers. It did not survive after 1904. von Bachelle was last heard from in 1915. The cars could travel 35 miles (56 km) on one charge. Otto later became consulting engineer at Hupmobile.
