= Marc Goldsmith =

American mechanical, nuclear engineer

Marc W. Goldsmith (born 1947) is an American mechanical and nuclear engineer and consulting engineer, who served as 131st president of the American Society of Mechanical Engineers for the year 2012‐2013.

== Biography ==
After regular education and high school, Goldsmith joined the U.S. Merchant Marine in 1968. He served as licensed Second and Third Assistant Engineer with the U.S. Merchant Marine until 1972. Prior to this period he obtained his BSc in marine nuclear science at the State University of New York Maritime College, and his MSc in nuclear engineering and Degree of Nuclear Engineer from the Massachusetts Institute of Technology in 1972–73.

After his graduation in 1972-73 Goldsmith had joined United Engineers & Constructors, Philadelphia, Pa., where he served as Nuclear and Environmental Licensing Engineer. In 1975 he co-founded Energy Research Group, Inc., where he was president until 1998. From 1998 he had joined Arthur D. Little, where he served as an associate director and then a director in Technology and Innovation Management. Next, from 2004 to 2005, he was vice president at Stone & Webster Management Consultants, specializing in strategic energy businesses. Eventually in 2005 he founded his own consultancy firm Marc Goldsmith & Associates LLC in Newton, Massachusetts.

At the American Society of Mechanical Engineers Goldsmith was elected fellow of ASME, has been awarded the Society's Dedicated Service Award in 2001, and served on both the Board of Governors and as its president in 2012–13.

== Selected publications ==
- Goldsmith, Marc W., et al. New energy sources: dreams and promises. Energy Research Group Inc., 1661 Worcester Road, Framingham, MA 01701, 1976.
- Marc W Goldsmith. A survey of the economic costs of nuclear fuel reprocessing, 1997.
- Marc W Goldsmith. 1980 progress report to the County of Suffolk, N.Y. : technical analysis and evaluation of safety issues concerning the Shoreham Nuclear Power Plant by Energy Research Group. 1981.
- Marc W Goldsmith. The Shoreham Nuclear Power Station Atomic Safety and licensing Board hearings : 1982 progress report to the County of Suffolk, N.Y. 1982.
- Marc W Goldsmith. The Shoreham Nuclear Power Station Atomic Safety and Licensing Board operating license proceeding : 1983 status report of technical assistance to the County of Suffolk, New York. 1983.

Articles, a selection

- Forbes, I. A., Goldsmith, M. W., Kearney, J. P., Kadak, A. C., Turnage, J. C., & Brown, G. J. (1974). "Nuclear debate: a call to reason (No. DOE/TIC-10312). Lowell Technological Inst., MA (USA). Dept. of Nuclear Engineering.
