= Velzy =

Velzy is a surname and can refer to:

- Charles O. Velzy (born 1930). American mechanical and consulting engineer
- Dale Velzy (1927–2005), American surfboard shaper
