= Warren Horton McBryde =

American engineer, industrialist and world traveler

Warren Horton McBryde (January 20, 1876 – March 15, 1959) was an American mechanical, electrical and consulting engineer, industrialist, and world traveler, who served as the 59th president of the American Society of Mechanical Engineers in 1940-41.

== Biography ==
=== Youth, education, first career and military service ===
McBryde was born in Mobile, Alabama to Thomas Calvin McBryde and Julia Pierce (Horton) McBryde, both natives of Alabama. He obtained his BSc in mechanical and electrical engineer from the Alabama Polytechnic Institute, now Auburn University, in 1897.

After his graduation in 1897 McBryde started at the Electric Lighting Co. of Mobile, and next as designer and drafter at George F. Barber. In 1899 he served in the Spanish–American War the U.S. Lighthouse Department and U.S. Engineers Corps. As chief electrician of the U.S. Army Transport-ship the Sheridan he made the voyage from New York City over the Atlantic and Mediterranean, via the Suez Canal over the Philippines and Nagasaki, Japan, to its destination in San Francisco.

=== Later career ===
After honorably discharged in 1889 McBryde was appointed assistant resident engineer at the Yuba Power Company, now the Pacific Gas and Electric Company, at the Colgate Hydro-Electric Power Plant in charge of construction its hydroelectric powerhouse. From 1900 to 1902 he was assistant superintendent at the new Peyton Chemical Company of Martinez. In 1902-03 back at the Pacific Gas & Electric Company he was chief draftsman in the engineering department.

In 1903 he joined the Hercules Powder Company in Hercules, California as resident engineer. He got promoted first chief of the West Coast engineering and construction department in 1906, and assistant superintendent in 1909. In 1919 he moved to the California & Hawaiian Sugar Refining Co. of San Francisco, where he was secretary and assistant to the general manager. In 1927 he started his own consultancy firm. He made his second and third circumnavigation of the globe, via the Panama Canals and Strait of Magellan, studying the prominent countries along the way.
