= Pakistan Army Corps of Electrical and Mechanical Engineering =

Pakistan army's staff corps for maintenance & repairs

Pakistan Army Corps of EME
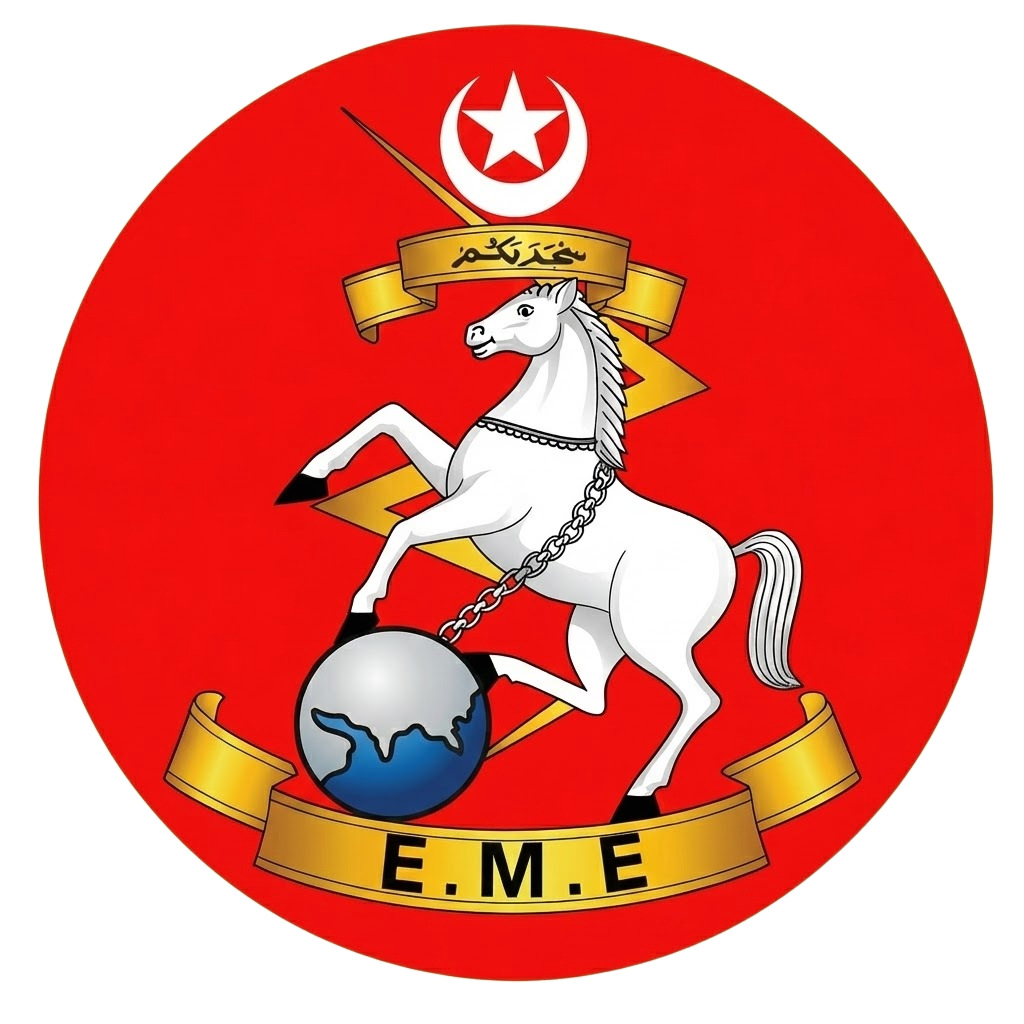
- Badge of Pakistan Army's EME
- Active: 12 September 1947 - present
- Country: Pakistan
- Branch: Pakistan Army
- Type: Combat support
- Role: Administrative and staffing oversight.
- Part of: HQ/Garrison
- HQ/Garrison: GHQ (Pakistan)
- Nickname: EME
- Motto: Hunermand
- Colors
- Anniversaries: 12 September
- Engagements: Military history of Pakistan
- Decorations: Awards and decorations of the Pakistan military
- Battle honours: Many

Commanders
- Director-General: Maj Gen Ayub Ahsan Bhatti HI(M)
- Notable commanders: Syed Ali Nawab

Insignia
- War flag

- Variant

The Pakistan Army Corps of Electrical and Mechanical Engineering is a military administrative and the engineering staff branch of the Pakistan Army.

The EME provides maintenance and inspections of wide range of Pakistan Army's mechanized and aviation assets and provides machinery of components besides supporting expertise in electrical works for the Pakistan Army.

== Overview ==
The Pakistan Army Corps of Electrical and Mechanical Engineering (EME) was formed as a separate maintenance arm into the Pakistan Army from the partition of the British Indian Army's Corps of EME— only twenty officers joining the arm. It was the British officers in the Royal Electrical and Mechanical Engineers (REME) that provided the support and training to raise the corps to help maintain the equipment of the Pakistan Army. Brigadier Vivian Edgar Beards was the first officer commanding of the EME when it was commissioned in the Pakistan Army as a corps on 20 October 1947.

From its early years, the education on electrical and mechanical engineering was provided by the Loughborough University with a mutual agreement between the British Army and the Pakistan Army. In 1957, the Pakistan Army established the College of Electrical & Mechanical Engineering with support from the United States Army. Subsequently, many officers of the army went to universities in the United States to study electrical and mechanical engineering. The College of Electrical & Mechanical Engineering was later upgraded in 1969.

The Corps of Electrical and Mechanical Engineering did not restrict its support to the army but extended its support to air force and navy, though each branch established its own staff corps to maintain their arms within their units. In 1960, an airborne course was established in the EME, making it mandatory for its officers and personnel to complete the parachute course— the EME has the oldest active parachutist courses in the country. In the 1970s, the Corps of EME played a crucial role in support of the machining of components, PCB prints, and the engineering aspects of the Pakistan's nuclear weapons program.

Many of its officers were instrumental in establishing the Combat Development Directorate, which was the pursuant of the Strategic Plans Division, that advised the Army GHQ in matters of nuclear-based strategic deterrence.

The Corps of Electrical and Mechanical Engineering is commanded the by its Director-General, usually at the active-duty two-star rank, Major-General, who works under the Chief of the General Staff at the GHQ (Pakistan).

== Some Notable Units ==
- 3 Technical Training Battalion EME
- 4 Technical Training Battalion EME
- 10 Electrical & Mechanical Engineering Battalion
- 41 EME Battalion
- 42 EME Battalion
- 43 EME Battalion
- 44 EME Battalion
- 47 EME Battalion
- 49 EME Battalion
- 50 EME Battalion
- 52 EME Battalion
- 53 EME Battalion [CEME 18 Div]

- 54 EME Battalion

- 58 EME Battalion
- 59 EME Battalion
- 70 EME Battalion
- 90 EME Battalion
- 91 EME Battalion [CEME 37 Div]
- 92 EME Battalion [CEME 35 Div "Behtreen Banway"]
- 94 EME Battalion
- 95 EME Battalion
- 118 EME Battalion
- 544 Heavy EME Battalion
- 546 EME Battalion
- 699 Aviation EME Battalion

== Director Generals EME ==
Name	Start of Term	End of Term
Brig W. P. B. Ashton	1948	1955
Brig M. Mohamedi	1955	1967
Maj Gen K.M. Masud	1967	1972
Brig M. Karim Ullah	1972	1976
Maj Gen Syed Ali Nawab	1976	1976
MMaj Gen M. Jalal Ud Din	1976	1978
Maj Gen Syed Saeed Akhtar	1978	1981
Maj Gen Qazi Abid Hussain	1981	1986
Maj Gen S. Qamar-uz-Zaman	1986	1988
Brig Abdul Majid	1988	1988
Maj Gen Javed Anwer Hashmi	1988	1993
Maj Gen Munir Hassan Khalid	1993	1995
Maj Gen Mian Salim Uddin	1995	1998
Maj Gen Sikandar Hayat	1998	2001
Maj Gen Akber Saeed Awan	2001	2002
Maj Gen Fazl-i-Ilahi	2002	2008
Maj Gen Jamshed Riaz	2008	2012
Maj Gen Khalid Mahmood	2012	2015
Maj Gen Rehan Baqi	2015	2018
Maj Gen Hassan Akhtar	2018	2021
Maj Gen Ayub Ahsan Bhatti	2021	2025
Maj Gen Attique Ahmed	2025	Current

== Media gallery ==
- PA, Pakistan Army (24 July 2011). "Corps of Electrical and Mechanical Engineers (EME) - Pakistan Army". youtube.
- "Corps of Electrical and Mechanical Engineers (EME) - Official Song". youtube. 18 February 2016.
