= 2013 North Korean missile tests =

The 2013 North Korean missile tests were a series of North Korean missile tests in 2013.

== May 2013 tests ==
In May 2013, North Korea launched three short-range guided missiles into the Sea of Japan. The first two missiles were shot in the morning, while the third was in the afternoon. The missiles were launched from the same location where two missiles had been displayed, fueled, and then removed weeks before.

On 19 May 2013, North Korea launched a fourth missile that landed in the Sea of Japan.

On 20 May 2013, North Korea launched short-range projectiles that landed in waters off the country's eastern coast.

== See also ==
- Missile
- List of North Korean missile tests
- 2013 in North Korea
