= Mashhood Test Firing Range =

Military testing area and firing range in Pakistan

Mashhood Test Firing Range (1998–99) Tilla Test Firing Range (present)
- Tilla Jogian, Punjab, Pakistan. Near Jhelum, Punjab in Pakistan
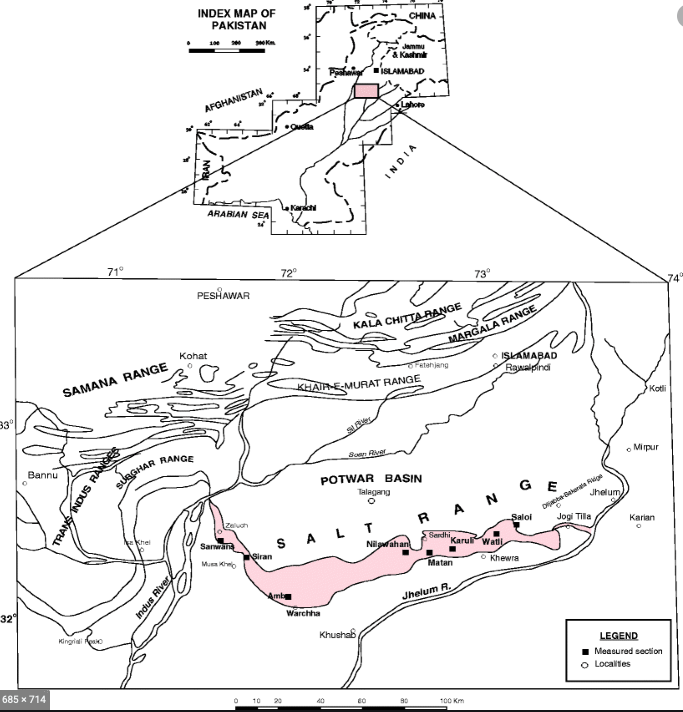
- Mashhood TFR in Salt Range in Pakistan

Site information
- Controlled by: Pakistan Army
- Open to the public: No
- Website: NTI Mashhood TFR

Location
- Coordinates: 33°20′N 73°17′E

Site history
- Built by: Corps of Ordnance

Mashhood Test Firing Range (MTFR) at Tilla Jogian is a military testing area and firing range located approximately 25 kilometres (16 mi) west of Jhelum, Punjab, Pakistan.

It was used by the Khan Research Laboratories (KRL) as a primary testbed for initial phase of its Ghauri program and now serves as the primary weapon test site for the Pakistan Army.

== Location ==
Tilla is an eastward continuation of the Salt Range in Jhelum District, Punjab, Pakistan, 3,242 feet above the sea. From the Bunha torrent the range rises rapidly to the culminating peak of Tilla Jogian and thence sinks as rapidly, but a series of low parallel ridges runs out across the valley of the Kahan. During British Rule, the hill was sometimes used as a summer resort by officers of Jhelum District. A famous monastery of Jogi fakirs is situated here.

== Current operations ==
The test range is known as Tilla Test Firing Range according to Pakistan Army sources. Pakistan Army conducts exercises at the Tilla Firing Range to check the performance of its unmanned tactical systems, missiles and range recovery operations.

In 1998–99, the Test Firing Range served as a testbed for the Khan Research Laboratories (KRL) during the development of the Ghauri program. Other operations included Pakistan Air Force's range practice with the Pakistan Army, and subsequent missile testing by ASFC.
