= 2021–2023 North Korean missile tests =

Missile testing in North Korea

North Korea conducted a series of missile tests from 2021 to 2023. North Korea conducted a record number of tests in 2022, including the first test over Japanese territory since 2017.

== 2021 ==
=== January ===
On 22 January 2021, North Korea launched an unknown cruise missile in Kusong. At that time, this missile was assessed as an anti-ship cruise missile, later renamed as "KN-27".

=== March ===
On 21 March 2021, North Korea again launched an unknown cruise missile in Onchon county. At that time, this missile was assessed as an anti-ship cruise missile, possibly KN-19, but later renamed as "KN-27".

On 25 March, North Korea carried out a test-launch of two upgraded Hwasong-11A (KN-23) short-range ballistic missiles carrying a 2.5-ton live warhead each that correctly hit the simulated targets. While North Korea's official statement reported a 600 km range, Japanese and South Korean sources reported that the missiles flew just over 400 km. Later, the South Korean Joint Chiefs of Staff revised their range assessment of the new North Korean missiles to 600 km and the Defense Minister said that blind spots due to earth curvature led to an initial estimate of 450 km. Later, it was identified as Hwasong-11C.

=== September ===
On 11–12 September 2021, North Korea carried out tests of a new long-range cruise missile, according to the Korean Central News Agency (KCNA). The missiles flew for 1,500 kilometres and successfully hit their target in North Korea's waters, and were meant for a "strategic role" according to the news agency, which analyst Ankit Panda stated was a common euphemism for a missile capable of carrying nuclear warheads.

On 15 September, North Korea fired two ballistic missiles off of its coast according to the South Korean military.

== 2022 ==
Overall, North Korea launched around 90 missiles in 2022. This exceeds its previous peak in 2017, when North Korea launched around 25 missiles. The following is a timeline of these launches.

=== January ===
On 5 and 11 January 2022, North Korea allegedly tested hypersonic missiles. On 14 January, North Korea tested the firing of ballistic missiles from a rail car. Various missile tests also took place on 25 January 27 January, and 30 January, with the 30 January launch assessed as an intermediate-range ballistic missile (IRBM) capable of striking targets as far as Guam.

=== February ===
On 27 February 2022, North Korea launched a ballistic missile towards the Sea of Japan. State media reported that the test was conducted for developing a reconnaissance satellite system.

=== March ===
North Korea launched another ballistic missile off its east coast into the sea on 4 March 2022.

North Korea apparently conducted a failed missile test on 16 March 2022, with the presumed missile exploding at a height of 20 km.

On 20 March, it was reported that North Korea fired a short-range multiple rocket launcher. North Korea's military fired four shots around 7:20 a.m. (22:00 GMT) on Saturday.

North Korea conducted its first successful ICBM launch in years on 24 March 2022.

=== April ===
North Korea fired two short-range missiles on 16 April 2022, testing what is possibly North Korea's first tactical nuclear weapons delivery system.

=== May ===
On 4 May 2022, at 12:03 pm local time, North Korea fired a missile from Sunan. Depending on the source, this was counted as either North Korea's 13th or 14th missile test of the year.

North Korea launched an apparent submarine-launched ballistic missile into the Sea of Japan on 7 May 2022.

A North Korean missile test may have taken place on 12 May 2022. The South Korean military assessed three short-range ballistic missiles fired East out of the Korean peninsula, while the Japanese Coast Guard reported a possible ballistic missile landing near Tokyo's exclusive economic zone.

According to the South Korean military, North Korea fired an ICBM and two other missiles on 25 May 2022. The ICBM reached 360 km (220 mi) downrange and achieved an apogee of 540 km (340 mi). The second missile was reportedly lost after reaching 20 km (12 mi) distance, and the third missile had a height of 60 km (37 mi) and a distance of 760 km (470 mi). This is the 17th North Korean missile test in 2022.

=== June ===
North Korea fired eight short-range ballistic missiles on 5 June 2022, which was said to be its largest single test. It was launched a day after South Korea and the United States ended their joint military drills.

=== August ===
On 17 August 2022, North Korea fired two cruise missiles for the first time since June.

=== September ===
On 25 September 2022, North Korea test-fired a ballistic missile toward its eastern sea. The test came as the US nuclear-powered aircraft carrier USS Ronald Reagan and its strike group arrived in South Korea for joint military exercises.

On 28 September, North Korea fired two more missiles, reportedly on an irregular trajectory.

On 29 September, North Korea launched at least one missile.

=== October ===
On 1 October 2022, North Korea fired ballistic missiles, its fourth test in a week.

On 4 October 2022, North Korea launched a missile that flew over and past Japan, prompting Japanese prime minister Fumio Kishida to release an announcement warning citizens to take shelter and other precautionary measures. The missile, likely another ICBM, is said to have landed in the Pacific without incident. It is also speculated that this missile has the longest range of all of the missiles tested by North Korea, and was fired over the Sea of Japan for the first time since 2017.

On 6 October 2022, North Korea fired two ballistic missiles.

On 9 October 2022, North Korea again fired two ballistic missiles.

On 12 October 2022, North Korea fired two long-range cruise missiles, each of which travelled 2,000 kilometres (1,200 mi), and were reported to have hit their targets.

On 14 October 2022, North Korea launched a short-range ballistic missile, towards its eastern waters.

On 28 October 2022, North Korea was reported to have launched a ballistic missile off its east coast.

=== November ===
On 2 November 2022, North Korea reportedly fired 23 missiles of various types, the most in a single day, including a ballistic missile that landed in international waters 167 kilometers off Ulleung island, triggering air raid sirens there.

On 3 November 2022, North Korea reportedly fired three ballistic missile off its east coast, one long-range and two short-range, including one that flew near Japan after failure. The launch triggered the Japanese emergency broadcast system, which warned residents in the prefectures of Miyagi, Yamagata, and Niigata to stay indoors.

On 5 November 2022, North Korea reportedly fired four short-range ballistic missiles into the western sea. The South Korean military said that the missiles travelled around 130 kilometres (81 mi) at an altitude of around 20 kilometres (12 mi).

On 8 November 2022, North Korea reportedly fired at least one ballistic missile into the sea on Wednesday, and South Korea said it had identified debris from an earlier launch as part of a Soviet-era SA-5 surface-to-air missile.

On 18 November 2022, North Korea reportedly fired at least one ballistic missile into the sea on Friday, believed to be the first successful full flight of its Hwasong-17. The missile landed in Japan's exclusive economic zone west of Hokkaido.

=== December ===
On 18 December 2022, North Korea reportedly fired two medium-range ballistic missiles. The missile tests were later confirmed by North Korea to be reconnaissance satellite components testing.

North Korea also test-fired two short-range ballistic missiles on 23 December. On 31 December, North Korea reportedly fired three short-range ballistic missiles.

== 2023 ==
=== February ===
North Korea's first missile test of 2023 took place on 18 February, when North Korea launched an ICBM that travelled for 989 kilometres (615 mi) at a "lofted angle" before landing in the sea just west of Japan. This prompted the US and South Korea to hold naval exercises in the area. North Korea followed these exercises with two more ballistic missile launches on 20 February.

On 24 February, North Korea fired four Hwasal-2 strategic cruise missiles off the east coast of the Korean Peninsula.

=== March ===
North Korea tested at least six short-range missiles on March 9. North Korean state media released photos of Kim attending tests alongside his daughter.

On 11 March, North Korea fired multiple cruise missiles from a submarine. This was North Korea's first launch of cruise (rather than ballistic) missiles from a submarine, as well as North Korea's first launch of multiple submarine missiles during a single launch event.

North Korea tested two short-range missiles on 14 March.

North Korea test-launched an ICBM on 16 March, followed by a short-range missile on 19 March, and by additional cruise missiles around 22 March.

North Korea tested two short-range missiles on 27 March. Japanese officials indicated the missiles appeared to have an irregular trajectory, suggesting the missiles might be maneuverable.

=== April ===
On 13 April, North Korea launched a missile. In Japan, residents of Hokkaido were told to seek immediate shelter, this follows statements by Kim Jong Un where he called for "more practical and offensive" capabilities. Later, the missile was confirmed to be a new solid-fueled ICBM, named Hwasong-18.

=== July ===
On 13 July, North Korea tested its latest Hwasong-18 intercontinental ballistic missile (ICBM) saying the weapon is the core of its nuclear strike force and a warning to the United States and other adversaries.

=== November ===
On 19 November 2023, ROK Defense Minister Shin Won-sik informed the Korean Broadcasting System that an anticipated third satellite launch by North Korea was expected by the end of that month. On the evening of 21 November 2023, North Korea's state-run Korean Central News Agency (KCNA) reported that a Chollima-1 rocket carrying a Malligyong-1 reconnaissance satellite was launched from the Sohae Satellite Launching Station, with North Korean leader Kim Jong Un present. On 23 November 2023, North Korea terminated the bi-lateral 2018 Comprehensive Military Agreement in response to South Korea's decision to suspend a part of that agreement in reaction to North Korea's latest satellite launch.

=== December ===
On 18 December, South Korea said North Korea has fired its most advanced intercontinental ballistic missile. The launch came a week after South Korean and US defence officials met to update plans on how to respond to a nuclear attack from the North. South Korean and Japanese officials said the missile travelled for 73 minutes, covering about 1,000 km (621 miles). The missile was later confirmed by North Korean state media as Hwasong-18.
