= Charles O. Velzy =

American engineer (1930–2020)

Charles O. Velzy (March 17, 1930 – December 11, 2020) was an American mechanical and consulting engineer, and business executive at Charles R. Velzy Associates, Inc. and later Charles O. Velzy, P.E. He is known as the 108th presidents of the American Society of Mechanical Engineers in 1989-1990.

== Biography ==
Charles O. Velzy was born in Oak Park, Illinois on March 17, 1930. He took his studies at the University of Illinois at Urbana–Champaign, where he obtained his BSc in civil engineering in 1953, and his MSc in sanitary engineering in 1959.

Valzy started his career at the engineering services company Nussbaumer, Clarke & Velzy as Senior Design Engineer from Senior Design Engineer in 1957, and was Project Engineer from 1959 to 1966. From 1966 to 1976 he was Secretary Treasurer of the Charles R. Velzy Associates, Inc., and president from 1976 to 1987. From 1987 to 1992 he served as Vice president of the Roy F. Weston Inc., and since 1992 he is private consultant and president of Charles O. Velzy, P.E., operation from in White Haven, Pennsylvania. He is working as consultant in the field of waste treatment and disposal.

In the year 1989-1990 Valzy served as the 108th presidents of the American Society of Mechanical Engineers.

Valzy died on December 11, 2020, at the age of 90.

== Selected publications ==
- Velzy, Charles O. The enigma of incinerator design, 1968.

Articles, a selection

- Velzy, Charles O. "30 years of refuse-fired boiler experience." Resource Recovery and Conservation 4.1 (1979): 83-98.
- Velzy, Charles O. "ASME standard sampling and analysis methods for dioxins/furans." Chemosphere 15.9-12 (1986): 1179-1185.
- Velzy, Charles O., J. Feldman, and M. Trichon. "Incineration technology for managing biomedical wastes." Waste Management & Research 8.4 (1990): 293-298.
- Velzy, Charles O., and Leonard M. Grillo. "Waste-to-energy combustion." Handbook of energy efficiency and renewable energy. CRC Press, Boca Raton, USA (2007).
