= Ghauri (missile) =

Pakistani medium-range ballistic missile (MRBM)

Hatf-V Ghauri
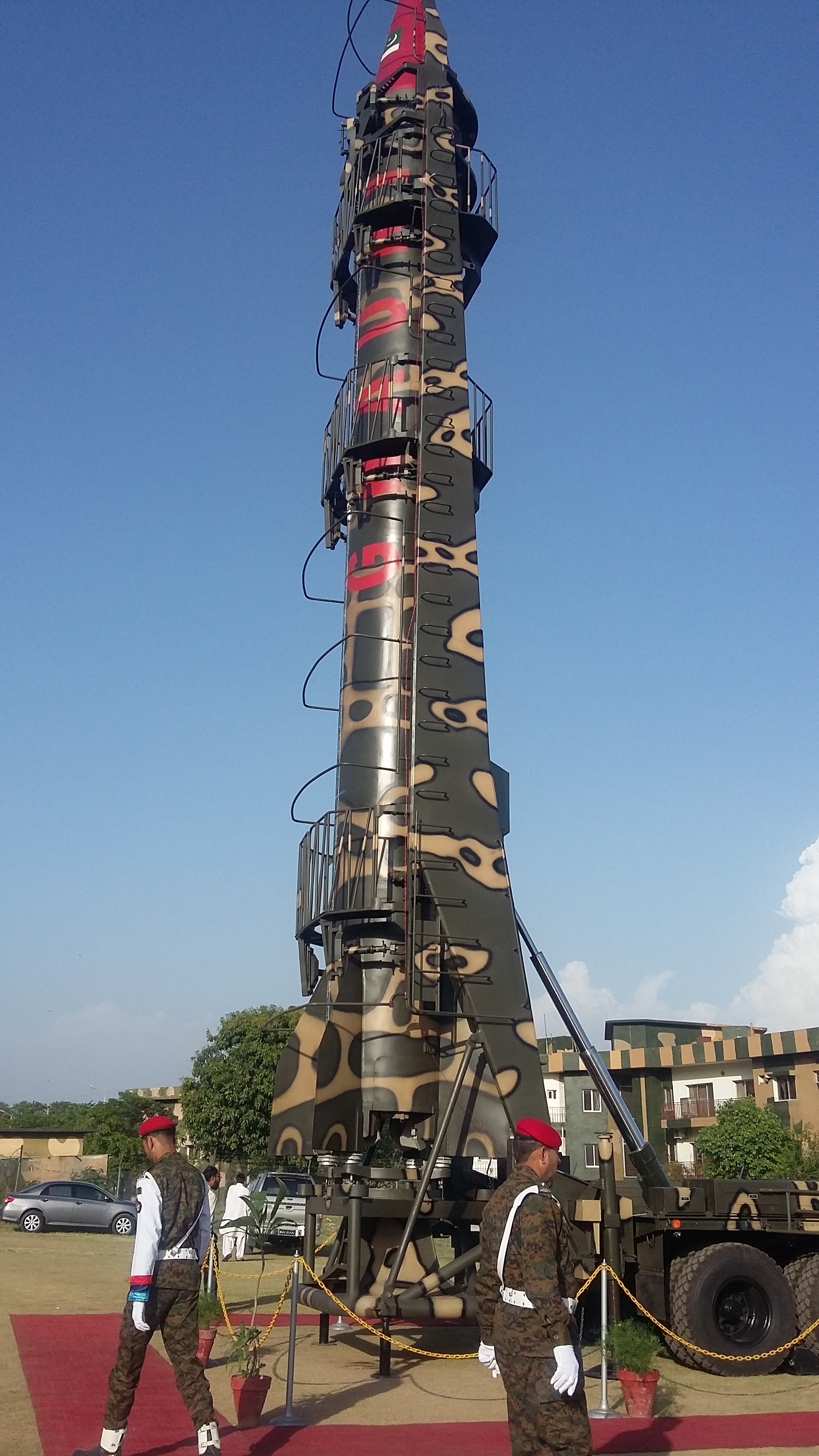
- The Hatf-V Ghauri on public display during celebrations of Youm-e-Takbir.
- Type: MRBM
- Place of origin: Pakistan

Service history
- In service: 2003–present
- Used by: Pakistan Army (Army Strategic Forces Command)

Production history
- Designer: Khan Research Laboratories (KRL)
- Designed: 1994–2001
- Manufacturer: Khan Research Laboratories
- No. built: 30 (estimated 2021)
- Variants: Ghauri-II, Ghauri-III

Specifications (Technical data)
- Mass: 15,850 kg (34,940 lb)
- Length: 15.90 m (52.2 ft)
- Diameter: 1.35 m (4.4 ft)
- Maximum firing range: 1,500 km (930 mi)
- Warhead: HE/NE
- Warhead weight: 750 kg (1,650 lb)
- Blast yield: 12 kilotons of TNT (50 TJ)—35 kilotons of TNT (150 TJ)
- Engine: Single Stage
- Payload capacity: 760 kg (1,680 lb)–1,158 kg (2,553 lb)
- Transmission: Manual
- Suspension: Atego x 8WD semi-trailer (with Pakistani military markings)
- Propellant: Liquid-propellant; Fuel: TM-185 (20% Gasoline 80% Kerosene); Oxidizer: AK-27I (73% HNO_{3}, 27% N_{2}O_{4})
- Fuel capacity: 12,912 kg (28,466 lb)
- Operational range: 1,350–1,500 kilometres (840–930 mi)
- Flight altitude: 350 km (220 mi) reached in first test flight
- Guidance system: Inertial, Terminal
- Accuracy: 190 m (620 ft) CEP
- Launch platform: Launch pad

The Ghauri–I (Urdu: غوری-ا; military designation: Hatf–V, Trans.: Target-5) is a land-based medium-range ballistic missile, in current service with the strategic command of the Pakistan Army.

Influenced from the propellent design of Nodong-1 of North Korea, its extensive modification, warhead design and assembly, and engineering of its control system took place in Khan Research Laboratories (KRL) in 1994–2001 with an objective of developing an electronic system that uses a single stage liquid fuel rocket motor to carry a payload of 700 kg to a range of 1,500 km. This range is applicable to address Pakistan's nuclear deterrence against India, if not all of India.

Codenamed as Ghauri, the missile was developed in as part of the secretive Hatf program that started in 1987. The program later evolved into the development of now cancelled Ghauri-III and the Ghauri-II which uses increased motor assembly length and improved propellants for an increased range of 2,300 km (1,400 mi).

The Ghauri is deployed in the ASFC with using the "Hatf-V" military designation which means "Target-5".

== History ==
=== Codename ===
Upon its development, the missile was named after the 12th century Sultan Shahabuddin Ghauri, by a senior scientist who worked on the program with a keen interest in medieval history— this codename was approved by the Prime Minister Benazir Bhutto in 1994. Sultan Muhammad Ghauri, who successfully campaigned in the northwestern region of India between 1176 and 1182, but was defeated in his first battle in northern India by Indian King Prithviraj Chauhan; but Ghauri returned in June 1192 when he defeated Prithviraj. He captured Delhi in 1199, but established his kingdom formally in 1206.

However, the JS HQ has officially codenamed the missile "Hatf–5 (Ghauri–I); the Hatf codename originates from the name of the sword or lance of Muhammad.

=== Development ===
According to the American intelligence estimates in 1999, the Ghauri–I is influenced and its design development is based on the Nodong-1 (a copy of former Soviet Scud) missile of North Korea. Development of Ghauri was a source of contention and controversy between Pakistan and the United States with Clinton administration publicly leveling serious allegations on the Benazir Bhutto's federal ministry of transferring nuclear technology in 1996. Later, Japan intervened in this matter, pressured Sharif administration to cut ties with North Korea in 1999.

There were many conflicting stories until 2012 when official documentation was published in a text about North Korea's contribution. Before 2012, many in Pakistan and the United States had alleged that the technology transfer took place in 1993 in return of the instructions on enrichment methods for uranium Not much has been publicized as controversy surrounds the claim that North Korean nuclear program was well advanced before the instructions on enrichment methods uranium were provided.

It is now well documented by the Pakistani military admissions that the finance ministry under Benazir Bhutto's administration had paid stacks of cash through its State Bank to North Korea as President Kim Il Sung was only interested in monetary values rather than technological barter trade. After the transaction, the North Korean scientists and engineers were then sent to Pakistan to teach aerospace engineering at Pakistani universities in 1993.

=== Design and engineering ===
Much of the engineering data for Ghauri comes from the former Soviet Scud technology, compiled by the American think tanks. The mechanism of North Korean's Nodong-1 is copied from the Soviet Scud specification to compare with Ghauri. The Khan Research Laboratories designed the warhead for the Ghauri and no official information is available due to Pakistani government classifying its data as Top Secret (TS confidentiality), aside from speculations from independent and outside sources.

According to the official Pakistani military reports, the original design of the missile was flawed and the missile's frontal conic nose section material burned up due to generated shock waves and hypersonic effect on re-entry during its first test flight in 1998. High stress and high temperature shift caused the material to melt during the re-entry while its vintage electronic systems, engine system, and propellant had to be replaced. The first design of Ghauri was built under the watchful guidance of North Koreans based on their specification but the Koreans were immediately sent back by Sharif administration after the failure of the system was identified. Eventually, the conic nose section was redesigned by rounding the cone which allowed the missile to travel from subsonic flow to supersonic flow. The KRL, now forced to collaborate with NESCOM (NDC), engaged in heavy reengineering of much of its controls and electronics system. Due to lack of experience at KRL it took years of expensive trials and errors to make Ghauri nuclear weapons delivery capable, and it was not until 2003 when Ghauri was finally capable of military deployment.

=== Prospect of civilian space program ===
The liquid fuel systems are incapable of storing fuel for any long period of time– the Ghauri–I requires fueling for several hours before launch, making it vulnerable to a first strike the standing enemy. Noting this constraint, the Pakistani war strategists have not pursued liquid fuel systems other than the Ghauri–I and Ghauri-II.

The Ghauri-I is a nuclear weapon-delivery capable missile which has been stated by the Pakistani military that it is also capable of being loaded with "all types" of warheads. Contrast to the Shaheen program that went under the joint conjecture of Pakistan's Air Force and the Army, the Ghauri program was designed for the Pakistan Army which was setting to accuracy goal for a highly accurate missile designed to strike high-value targets.

In 2004, there was a strong lobby within the engineering community to make Ghauri feasible as a launch vehicle for satellites.

== Operational history and tests ==
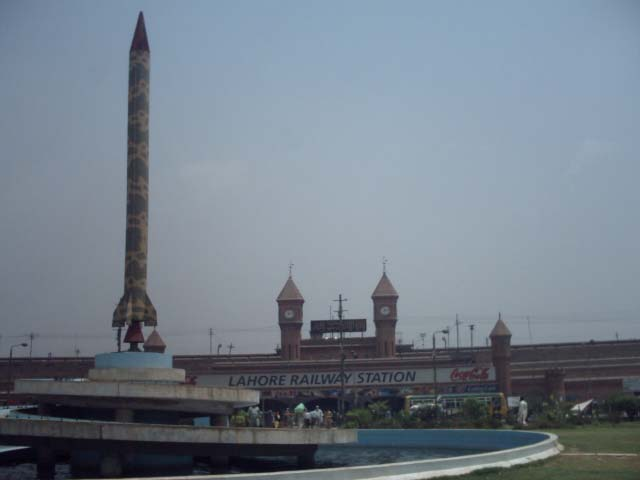
The Ghauri's mock-up displayed at the Lahore Railway Station.c. 2004.

The Ghauri–I was first test fired at 7:25hrs on 6 April 1998 from the Mashhood Test Firing Range near Malute, Jhelum Cantt which is about 76 mi (122.31 km) south of the Islamabad. It was fired from a transporter erector launcher and traveled 1,100 km (680 mi) in a flight lasting 9 minutes and 58 seconds. It climbed to a height of 350 km before turning in the direction of its planned impact area in the desert of Balochistan where it hit the designated target at 7:33hrs. At the time, Pakistani military's information source, the ISPR stated that the missile hit its designated target in the desert of Balochistan.

Official Pakistani military reports revealed that the first test was not successful because the missile's conic nose melted due to tremendous amount of heat during the re-entry phase of its flight. Failure of Ghauri-I was a huge disappointment for the military and the Sharif administration; angrily, Sharif administration decided to cut off the North Korean connections and sent its engineers back to North Korea. After redesigning its warhead by rounding it to avoid the hypersonic effect but traveling from subsonic to supersonic flow, Ghauri–I was successfully test fired for second time as then-Prime Minister Zafarullah Jamali witnessed the test in 2004 — at least six years since its first failed flight.

On 21 December 2010, the Ghauri–I was again successfully test fired for a third time. On 12 November 2012, the Ghauri–I was successfully test fired for a fourth occasion by the Strategic Missile Group of the Army Strategic Force Command. The test-flight was monitored by the new Strategic Command and Control Support System (SCCSS) and is believed to have been geared towards testing the SCCSS rather than the missile itself.

On 15 April 2015, Ghauri-I was again test fired from Mashhood Test Firing Range.

Besides Hatf-I, the Ghauri missile is the only system that is transported through separate 8WD semi-trailer mounted on the Mercedes-Benz Atego truck, with visible Pakistani military markings.

Evolution and Design Comparison of Ghauri system
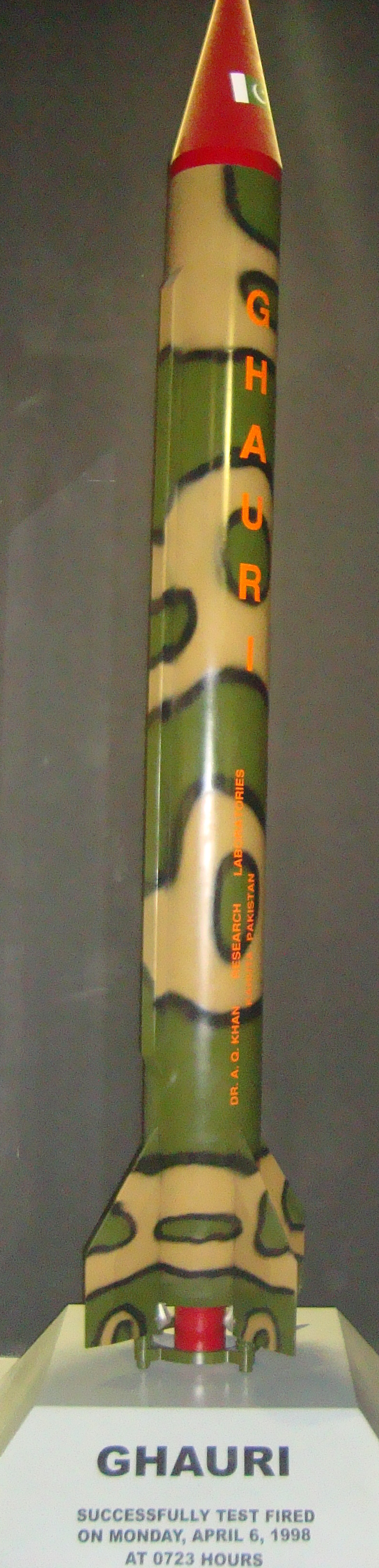
The design concept and mockup of Ghauri–I system at the Pakistan Army Museum.

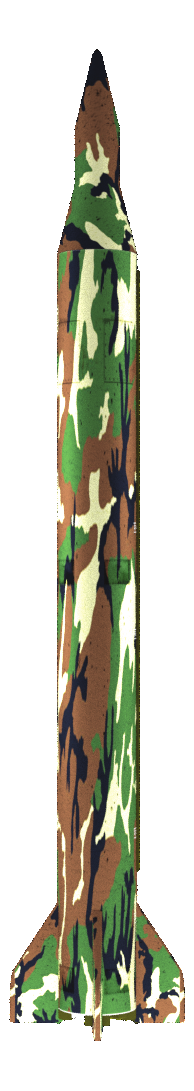
Diagram of the North Korean Nodong-1 ballistic missile

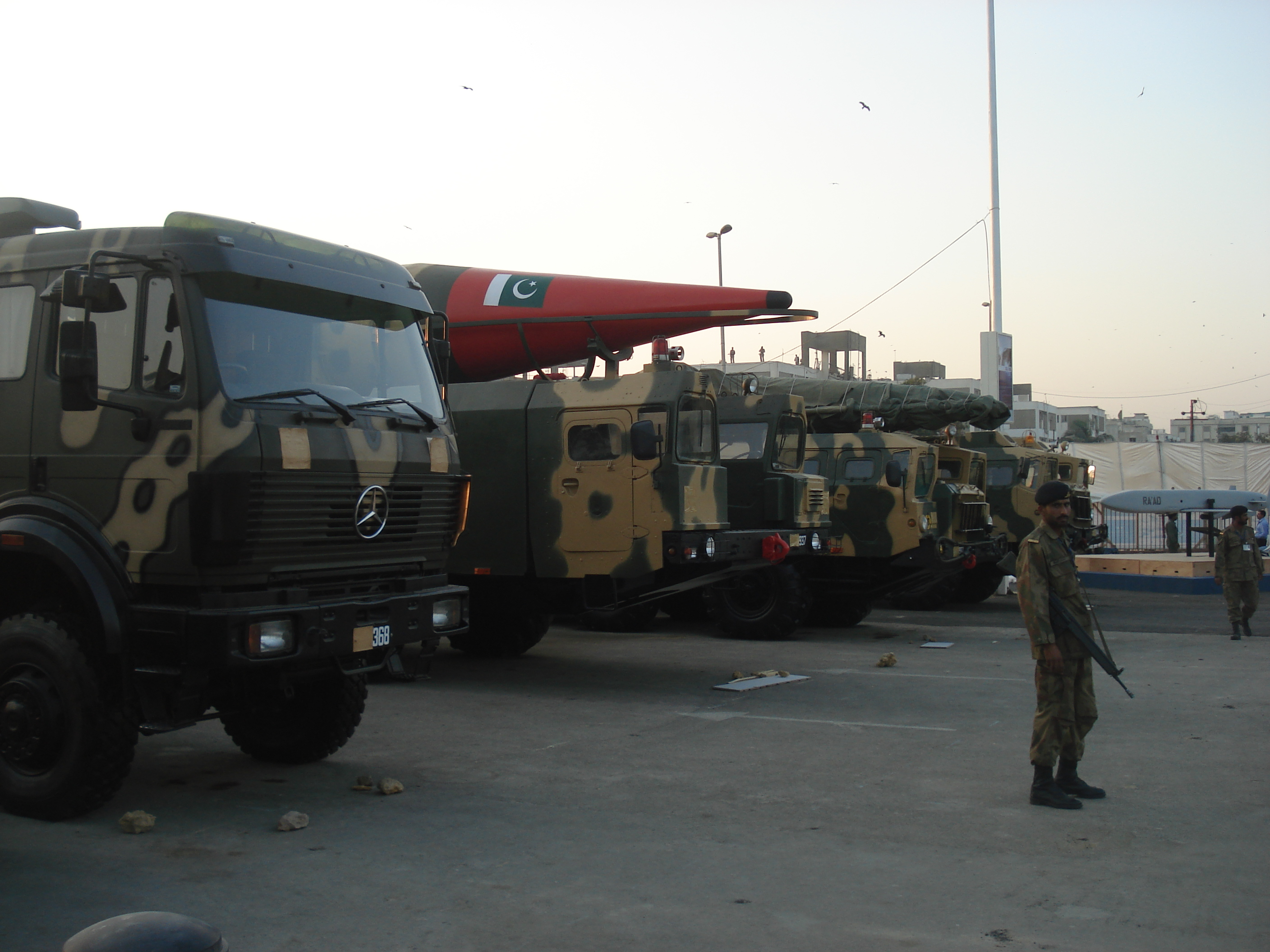
The Atego truck, with visible Pakistani military markings (seen in left), is a transporter vehicle of Ghauri, ca. 2008.

== See also ==
- Nodong-1
- Ballistic missile
- Liquid fuel rocket

Related developments

- Ghauri-II
- Ghauri-III

Related lists

- List of missiles
