= Pukchang Airport =

Airport in North Korea

Pukch'ang Airport
- IATA: none; ICAO: none

Summary
- Airport type: Military
- Serves: Pukchang, North Korea
- Elevation AMSL: 217 ft (66 m)
- Coordinates: 39°30′15.90″N 125°57′51.60″E

Map
- Location within North Korea Location within Asia Location within North Pacific Location within Earth

Runways
Direction	Length		Surface
Direction	ft	m	Surface
14/32	8,150	2,484	Concrete

Pukchang Airport (북창비행장) is an airport in Pyongan-namdo, North Korea. It serves as the military airfield for the nearby city of Sunchon.

== Facilities ==
The airfield has a single concrete runway 14/32 measuring 8,150 by 164 feet (2,484 m × 50 m). It has several aprons and taxiway leading to both revetments and underground aircraft storage. It is home to a fighter regiment of Mikoyan-Gurevich MiG-23 jets and Mikoyan-Gurevich MiG-29 jets.

== Missile testing ==
The airfield was used to test-launch a Hwasong-12 intermediate-range ballistic missile on April 28, 2017, with the missile subsequently crashing into Chongsin-dong, Tokchon.
