= Hwasong-7 =

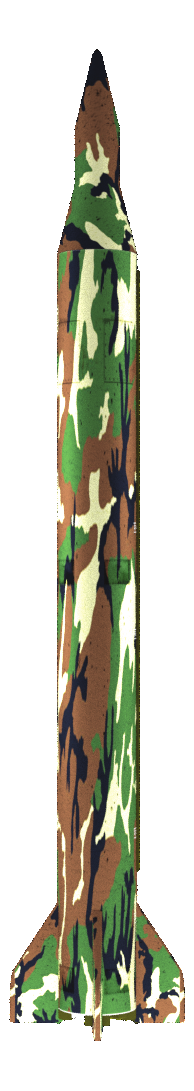
- Artist rendition of the missile
- Type: Medium-range ballistic missile
- Place of origin: North Korea

Service history
- In service: 1998−present
- Used by: See § Operators

Production history
- Produced: 1990–present

Specifications
- Length: 15.6 m (51 ft)
- Diameter: 1.25 m (4 ft 1 in)
- Warhead: Conventional, possibly nuclear
- Warhead weight: 700–1,000 kg (1,500–2,200 lb) (estimated)
- Propellant: TM-185 and AK-27I
- Operational range: 1,000–1,500 km (620–930 mi) (estimated)
- Flight altitude: 160 km (99 mi) (lofted trajectory)
- Guidance system: Inertial
- Accuracy: 190–2,000 m (620–6,560 ft) CEP

The Hwasong-7 (Korean: 《화성-7》형; lit. 'Mars Type 7') is a single-stage, mobile liquid propellant medium-range ballistic missile developed by North Korea. Developed in the mid-1980s, it is a scaled-up adaptation of the Soviet R-17 Elbrus missiles, more commonly known by its NATO reporting name "Scud". The inventory is estimated to be around 200–300 missiles. US Air Force National Air and Space Intelligence Center estimates that as of June 2017 fewer than 100 launchers were operationally deployed.

It influenced the design of Pakistan's Ghauri-1 missile, as well as the Iranian Ghadr-110.

== Description ==
Estimated maximum range of some North Korean missiles, including Hwasong-7

Hwasong-7 is a larger variant of the R-17, scaled up so its cross-sectional area is about doubled, with a diameter of 1.25 metres (4 ft) and a length of 15.6 metres (51 ft). The precise capabilities and specifications of the missile are unknown; even the fact of its production and deployment are controversial.

Its aerodynamic design is stable, reducing the need for modern active stabilization systems while the missile is flying in the denser lower atmosphere. The Hwasong-7 uses the liquid propellant combination of TM-185 (20% gasoline and 80% kerosene) and AK-27I (27% N_{2}O_{4} and 73% HNO_{3}). Unlike modern missiles, Hwasong-7 can only be fueled when vertical, meaning it cannot be fueled before transport. With a 1,000 kg (2,200 lb) warhead, its range is estimated to be 900 km (560 mi). Further range analysis includes a range of 1,000–1,500 km (620–930 mi) to a high-end estimation of 2,000 km (1,200 mi), meaning all South Korean territories, as well as Japan, Russia and China are covered by Hwasong-7's range.

It has an estimated circular error probable (CEP) of 1,000–2,000 m (3,300–6,600 ft), but it can be reduced to between 190 m (620 ft) and 1,000 m (3,300 ft) with GPS guidance. North Korea is believed to possess some 300 Hwasong-7 missiles and fewer than 50 mobile launchers.

To enable interception at higher altitudes, South Korea is indigenously developing the long-range surface-to-air missile (L-SAM), and on 8 July 2016 the U.S. agreed to deploy one Terminal High Altitude Area Defense missile defense system in Seongju County, in the south of South Korea, by the end of 2017.

=== Naming ===
The "Hwasong-7" is the North Korean internal designation for the missile. The missile is also known by external designations from Western analysts, including Rodong-1, No Dong-1, Rodong, Nodong, Scud-D, Scud Mod-D and Nodong-A.

=== Variant for reconnaissance satellite testing ===
Hwasong-7 has a variant with white livery for reconnaissance satellite cameras testing. On 18 December 2022, North Korea launched two medium-range ballistic missiles from Sohae Satellite Launching Station, flying 500 km (310 mi) with an apogee of 550 km (340 mi). According to North Korea, the test was organized by the National Aerospace Development Administration to evaluate reconnaissance satellite components, including camera and data transmission system. Released images included an photo indicating the missiles appeared to be a derivation from Hwasong-7 or Scud missile.

== History ==
It is believed North Korea obtained R-17 designs from Egypt, and possibly modified designs from China, allowing them to reverse-engineer them into a larger and longer-distance weapon. United States reconnaissance satellites first detected this type in May 1990 at the Musudan-ri test launch facility, in northeastern North Korea. A test launch happened at the same time, but likely failed, since burn marks were captured by photographs at the launch site. Later, low-rate production started in January 1991 and North Korea conducted another test-fire of Hwasong-7 in May 1993. Also, between 1993 and 1994, North Korea had produced a sufficient number of Hwasong-7 missiles to be considered operational, and five years later, Hwasong-7 became deployed.

North Korea test-fired Hwasong-7 missiles in 2006, 2009, as well as 2014, in which North Korea fires two missiles that flew 650 km (400 mi).

Although it has an estimated range of 1,000–1,500 km (620–930 mi), launches in March 2014 flew only 650 km (400 mi), as the missiles flew to an altitude of 160 km (99 mi) because of lofted trajectory. The missiles achieved a maximum speed of Mach 7 (8,600 km/h). U.S. and South Korean Patriot PAC-2/3 interceptors are more specialized to hit ballistic missiles up to 400 km (250 mi).

On 5 September 2016, North Korea fired three missiles into the Sea of Japan, these missiles achieved about 1,000 km (620 mi) range. Initially, these missiles were believed to be Hwasong-7, however, it was later revealed that the missiles used for this launch were Hwasong-9 (Scud-ER). The United States strongly condemned the launch.

=== Exporting ===
The Hwasong-7's technology has been exported to foreign nations (such as Iran and Pakistan) in secrecy on the basis of mutual exchange of technologies, with Iran being one of the largest beneficiaries of such technology. Successful variants were tested and deployed by Iran after developing the Shahab-3 which is roughly based on Hwasong-7. The May 1993 test of Hwasong-7 is believed to be observed by Iranian and Pakistani delegations. Some press reports (including The Sunday Telegraph, Jerusalem Post, and Janes) claimed that Libya signed a contract for a total of 50 Nodong systems in October 1999, with the first batch delivered in July 2000, however such rumors proved to be false when Libya voluntarily dismantled its weapons of mass destruction programs in December 2003 and invited foreign inspectors to verify the disarmament process. In that same year, US inspectors learned that Iraq attempted to buy Nodong missiles, but the North Koreans never delivered the missiles and refused to refund the $10 million down payment.

== Operators ==
=== Current ===
- Iran − Ghadr-110 used by the Islamic Revolutionary Guard Corps Aerospace Force.
- North Korea − Used by the Korean People's Army Strategic Force. According to the International Institute for Strategic Studies (IISS), as of 2025, North Korea is possessing about 10 Hwasong-7 launchers.
- Pakistan − Hatf 5 Ghauri used by the Army Strategic Forces Command.

=== Unconfirmed ===
- Egypt − Reportedly was interested in buying Nodong missiles, but photographic evidence only shows Scud-Bs or possibly Scud-Cs in use.
- Ba'athist Syria − Developed a localized version of the Nodong missile. Reportedly received 50 missiles and seven TELs from North Korea in 2000. According to the International Institute for Strategic Studies, the Syrian Arab Army doesn't operate MRBMs as of 2024.

=== Failed bids ===
- Iraq − Prior to the 2003 invasion of Iraq, Baghdad placed an order for Nodong missiles and made a $10 million down payment, but North Korea never delivered the missiles.

== See also ==
- Strategic Rocket Forces (North Korea)
- North Korean missile tests
- North Korean defense industry
- Military of North Korea

== Bibliography ==
- Ballistic and Cruise Missile Threat. National Air and Space Intelligence Center (Report). Defense Intelligence Ballistic Missile Analysis Committee. 2017.
- International Institute for Strategic Studies (12 February 2024). "Chapter Five: Asia". The Military Balance. 124 (1): 218–327. doi:10.1080/04597222.2024.2298593. ISSN 0459-7222.
- International Institute for Strategic Studies (12 February 2024). "Chapter Six: Middle East and North Africa". The Military Balance. 124 (1): 328–395. doi:10.1080/04597222.2024.2298594. ISSN 0459-7222.
- Pinkston, Daniel A. (2008). The North Korean Ballistic Missile Program. Strategic Studies Institute, U.S. Army War College. ISBN 978-1-58487-342-6.
