= Khan Research Laboratories =

Research and development complex in Kahuta, Rawalpindi.

- Nickname: KRL
- Established: 31 July 1976; 50 years ago
- Research type: Fundamental science
- Location: Kahuta, Punjab,, Pakistan; 33.621106°N 73.3781°E
- Affiliations: GCU; UoK
- Operating agency: Strategic Plans Division on behalf of the National Command Authority
- Website: krl.com.pk

The Dr. A. Q. Khan Research Laboratories is a federally funded research and development complex located in Kahuta, Punjab, Pakistan. Established in 1976, the laboratory is best known for its central role in Pakistan's nuclear weapons program and its understanding of nuclear science.

Established in 1976 as Engineering Research Laboratories, it was originally organized as a top-secret industrial plant dedicated to enrichment as a response to the India's detonation of its first nuclear bomb in 1974. The site was chosen for its remote yet relatively accessible location near Rawalpindi. In the 1970s, the site was the cornerstone of the first stage of Pakistan's atomic bomb program, and serves as the center for conducting the nuclear scientific research.

It is globally known for its research in gas centrifuges to produce the enriched uranium; and in past, it has competed with the Pakistan Institute of Nuclear Science & Technology on wide variety of weapon designs but it is now have focused in civilian missions, including the national security, fusion science, automation technology, and supercomputing.

== History ==
As an aftermath of the India's first nuclear test, the Pakistan Atomic Energy Commission (PAEC) launched the studies on isotope separation through gas method by setting the plant as Project-706 under Bashiruddin Mahmood, a nuclear engineer, in 1974.

In 1976, the difficulties encountered in preliminary studies under Mahmood on understanding the equation of state of uranium indicated the need for a dedicated laboratory solely to that purpose. Work on establishing the laboratory was initiated by the army's Engineer-in-Chief who selected Brigadier Zahid Ali Akbar to conduct the topographic survey. Because the experiments were considered too dangerous to conduct in a major city, Brig. Akbar recommended relocating operations to an isolated, remote mountainous area and selected Kahuta, a short distance from Rawalpindi.

On 31 July 1976, the laboratory was established as Engineering Research Laboratories (ERL) with Abdul Qadeer Khan as its principal investigator. The officers and personnel from the Corps of Electrical and Mechanical Engineering (EME) were central in working and supporting the operations of the lab with Major-General Ali Nawab acting its principle engineer in 1979. More broadly, the ERL was intended to spur innovation and provide competition to the weapon design with the second lab in Nilore running under the PAEC's contract. Under Abdul Qadeer Khan, the work on equation of state of uranium began with drs. G. D. Alam, Tasneem Shah, and Anwar Ali who served as co-principle investigators at Kahuta.

Initially, a large numbers of centrifuges were deployed but they were scaled down to few centrifuges after revised critical mass calculations on equation of state of uranium by Abdul Qadeer Khan and his co-investigators in 1980s.

Its official name was changed to the Khan Research Laboratory in 1981 by presidential decree of President Zia-ul-Haq, which also allowed its status as a national defense laboratory.

=== Uranium research ===
Globally, the KRL has a prestige in conducting research into uranium metallurgy, its properties, phase diagrams, and behavior of uranium to learn how uranium is scaled to industrial-to-weapon-grade level and how its equation of state changes under the extreme pressure and temperature. For such investigation, principle investigators employed the Zippe method (local designation: Khan Centrifuge) that runs about 100,000 rpm on continuous at an average of 10 years.

The Uranium (U^{92}) is a naturally occurring element that can be found in low levels within all rock, soil, and water. The Natural uranium (U^{nat}) consists of three isotopes, Uranium-238 (U^{238}), which is 99.28% natural abundance, the Uranium-235 (U^{235}), which is subject of interest for energy measurement available only at 0.71%, and uranium-234, with proportion of 0.0054%. The Uranium-235 is fissile but at 0.71% it cannot sustain the chain reaction in a nuclear weapon environment, which requires the 90% of U^{235} but remains uncontrolled whose reaction takes place in a short amount of time– in a nanosecond time. For this purpose, gas centrifuge methods using ultra high vacuum technology were established, but this method took several years to master, and it was not until 1985 that the KRL produced highly enriched uranium (HEU). By 1986–87, the KRL's principal investigators were able to produce their first pit made with Uranium alone.

The computer simulations and experiments on uranium are conducted by KRL to understand the structural, electrical, material, and chemical properties as well as uranium fused allows and to determine how these materials change over time under temperature and pressure difference.

=== Negative publicity ===
The laboratory has attracted negative publicity from a number of events, mainly due to its past research affiliation with North Korea and China. Research collaboration with China Academy of Engineering Physics (CAEP) was crucial for KRL in weapons designs, development, and other related work to try and compete with second lab in Nilore but it garnered much negative publicity around the world.

In 1996, the Clinton administration publicly accused China of approving the tender released for the KRL on the acquisition of specially-made magnetic rings for special suspension bearings mounted at the top of rotating centrifuge cylinders. In 1999, a visit by the Saudi dignitaries accompanied by the Sharif administration personnel to the laboratory also garnered further negative publicity at the Western media that raised fears of proliferation in the middle east.

In 2003, the Pakistani nuclear physicist, Abdul Qadeer Khan, was accused of (and later pardoned) for mishandling the classified information on the weapons-related designs and the gas centrifuges passed onto the China, North Korea, Iran, India, and Libya that were taken from the lab's computers in between 1980s to early 1990s.

=== Medical works ===
In order to provide medical facilities to its employees and general public, KRL operates a 350-bed hospital in Islamabad. The hospital provides services for both inpatients and outpatients. The hospital is providing emergency care, surgery, surgical ICU, pediatrics, and specialist OPDs among other medical services.

The hospital also encompasses a blood bank, laboratories, radiology department, and pharmacy as well. The administration structure of KRL Hospital is semi-autonomous and it currently operates under Kahuta Research Laboratories (KRL) Welfare Trust.

== Extended research ==
The academic research programs and development opportunities at the KRL are supported by the physics departments of the Government College University in Lahore in Punjab and the University of Karachi in Sindh. The KRL supports its physics program through funding and providing scholarship to physics and engineering students at the Government College University.

The continuing efforts to make the laboratories more science efficient led the Ministry of Science (MoST) to grant a three research and fellowship programs with the Government College University with the support of Pakistan Science Foundation (PSF). Since 1980, the KRL continues to develop the research work on computational mathematics, supercomputing, and advanced mathematics to the extended applications to continue its outreach in defense programs.

In 1999, the KRL initiated efforts to establish the Khan Institute of Computer Science and Information Technology at Kahuta.

The civilian research on biotechnology, biology and Genetic Engineering is supported by the KRL at the University of Karachi, with the support from Pakistan Science Foundation. The KRL organized a conference on Computational biology in Islamabad to present overview of the scope of computational sciences.

== National security and research program ==
From 1976 till 1978, the lab depended heavily on the Urenco Group's method on developing the gas centrifuge, which it says to be suffering due to incomplete mechanical parts and differential equation problems involving rotational dynamics on a fixed axis. Dependence on the Zippe-type was lessened when more effective and innovative methods were developed that culminated from the studies conducted under Drs. A.Q. Khan, G.D. Allam and T. S. Shah. In Pakistan MoD laboratory system, the KRL is a senior laboratory executes missions relating to national security.

The technology of krytron was also built at the KRL which was then transferred to Heavy Industries Taxila, an army laboratory based in Taxila. Besides the understanding the equation of state of uranium, the KRL also embarked on pioneering work on vacuum science and its extended application in plasma physics– its first paper on plasma physics was written in 1998. In 1983, the KRL was able to acquire its very first computer numerical control (CNC) from China to provide machining of the high-strength ultracentrifuges which was able to produce the uranium hexafluoride (UF_{6}) gas that the KRL reduced to uranium metal and machined into weapon pits. In 1987, the KRL began publishing a series of academic articles on numerics and computational methods for centrifuge design, including a 1987 article co-authored by Abdul Qadeer Khan on techniques for balancing sophisticated ultracentrifuge rotors.

In the 1990s, the mathematicians at the KRL had built the nation's first high performance computing machines and the supercomputer that were installed at the facility. The subcritical experiments on weapon-grade uranium began when a parallel Computational Fluid Dynamics (CFD) division was established which specialized in conducting high performance computations on shock waves in weapons effect from the outer surface to the inner core by using difficult differential equations of the state of the materials used in the bomb under high pressure.

The KRL was major participant in MoD's Hatf program (lit. Target). The lab served as a chief designer of the warhead design, control systems, and rocket engine development of the Hatf and Ghauri weapon systems.

- Hatf-I – first tested in 1989.
- Ghauri-I (Hatf V) – first tested in 1999.
- Ghauri-II – has a range of 2,000–2,500 km.

Since the 1980s, the KRL is involved in numerous military equipment and conventional weaponry development projects. The resulting systems have been put into service by the Pakistan's military and exported to other friendly nations. The following is a list of known equipment produced under these projects:

- Guided missiles:
  - Anza series MANPADS.
  - Baktar-Shikan man-portable anti-tank guided missile (ATGM).
  - Modules for the BGM-71 TOW ATGM.
- Electrical and electronic equipment:
  - Power conditioners for the above missile systems.
  - Switched-mode power supplies for the following air defence systems:
    - LAADS radar, Skyguard radar, Air Defense Automation System.
- Equipment for clearance of anti-personnel and anti-tank mines, including remote control mine exploders (RCME) and mine-sweeping line charges.
- Laser equipment:
  - Laser range-finders, laser warning receivers, laser aiming devices, a laser actuated targeting system for training tank gunners.
- Reactive armour kits for armoured vehicles and APFS-DS anti-tank ammunition for main battle tanks.
- Digital goniometers.
- Electronic Voting Machine (EVM)– the KRL entered in competition with National Institute of Electronics (NIE) and Indra Sistemas of Spain to produce and demonstrate the usage of electronic voting machines. Eventually, the Election Commission of Pakistan awarded the contract to KRL for the final design and production of the electronic voting machines in 2018.

== Corporate management ==
=== Contract changes ===
The KRL is owned by the federal Government of Pakistan and sponsors the laboratory through the Ministry of Defence as its continuing efforts to make the laboratory more efficient. In its early years, the Corps of Engineers had served its first prime contractor from 1976 until 1977. From 1977 till 1981, the Corps of Electrical and Mechanical Engineering served on the MoD's contract with Maj-Gen. Ali Nawab overseeing the lab's operations. Since then, the lab's corporate leadership has been entrusted with civilian leadership through contracts awarded by the MoD.

At the behest of the laboratory director in 1981, the tender was opened to the University of Karachi and the Government College University to oversee its operations. The KRL's research and university affiliation with the University of Karachi still continues to this date.

With the formation of the federal National Command Authority in 2001, the agency took over the lab's business operations when it awarded the Strategic Plans Division as KRL's prime contractor, which it has been managing the lab operation since 2004.

In 2010, the Strategic Plans Division won the first international contract for the KRL with Malaysian Armed Forces when it was reported that the KRL was to serve as a design and engineering contractor for conventional weapons export through the Malaysian Scomi Group.

== Sports ==
Khan Research Laboratories Football Club, commonly abbreviated as KRL FC, is the football section of Khan Research Laboratories. The club has won Pakistan's top-flight football league multiple times. In the 2018–19 season, KRL FC recorded the highest average home league attendance in the top-tier football league of Pakistan.

The average attendance per top-flight football league season and the club with the highest average attendance:

Season	League average	Best club	Best club average
2018-19	767	KRL FC	1,838
