= Hwasong-9 =

North Korean medium-range ballistic missile

- Type: Medium-range ballistic missile
- Place of origin: North Korea

Service history
- Used by: Korean People's Army Strategic Force

Production history
- Designed: 1990s

Specifications
- Mass: 6,400–9,200 kg (14,100–20,300 lb)
- Length: 12.8–13.5 m (42–44 ft)
- Diameter: 0.88 m (2 ft 11 in)
- Warhead: 500 kg (1,100 lb) single warhead (conventional high-explosive, chemical, or biological); Possibly nuclear-capable
- Operational range: 700–1,000 km (430–620 mi)
- Accuracy: 50–3,000 m (160–9,840 ft) CEP
- Launch platform: 4-axle TEL

The Hwasong-9 (Note: Also known as Scud-ER (Scud Extended Range) and KN-04 (United States's designation).) (Korean: 《화성-9》형; lit. 'Mars Type 9') is a North Korean single-stage, liquid-fueled medium-range ballistic missile. The advanced version of Hwasong-6 with longer range and smaller warhead, it is the last Scud-derived missile of North Korea. Hwasong-9 was developed from 1991 and first test-fired in 1993, but it remained unknown to the intelligence community until 2016.

== Description ==
Images of the Hwasong-9
- September 2016 test
- March 2017 test

The Hwasong-9 is the last Scud-derived missile of North Korea. Its estimated length, diameter and mass are 12.8–13.5 m (42–44 ft), 0.88 m (2 ft 11 in) and 6,400–9,200 kg (14,100–20,300 lb) respectively. The missile's transporter erector launcher is a MAZ-543 truck with four axles. It also has a separable warhead that is separated after engine burnout to improve the trajectory stability and reduce the radar signature.

The Hwasong-9 is capable of travelling 700–1,000 km (430–620 mi) with a 500 kg (1,100 lb) warhead, configured in a biconic nose cone. This is achieved by conducting some modification to Hwasong-6, including the enlargement of propellant tanks and the reduction of payload. It is a single-stage, road-mobile missile that can employ a high-explosive, submunition, chemical, or potentially miniaturized nuclear warhead with a reported CEP of 50–3,000 m (160–9,840 ft). Its range allows the North Korean military to strike anywhere on the Korean Peninsula and threaten areas of Japan. It is possible that Hwasong-9 is nuclear-capable.

== History ==
North Korea reportedly began developing Hwasong-9 in 1991 and could start production from 1994. Before starting production, North Korea apparently tested Hwasong-9 in 1993.

Reports suggest Syria received these missiles in 2000, enabling them to target all of Israel and southeastern Turkey, including Ankara. Syria also converted its own Hwasong-6 production line in order to make the Hwasong-9.

According to the United Nations, since 2008, North Korea has assisted Syria in development of manoeuvrable vehicles for Hwasong-9.

Hwasong-9 was test-fired in September 2016 and March 2017.

In 2024, Hwasong-9 was reported to be used during Russian invasion of Ukraine from November 2023.

According to the International Institute for Strategic Studies (IISS), as of 2025, North Korea is possessing "some" Hwasong-9 launchers.

== List of tests ==
| Attempt | Date (Pyongyang Standard Time) | Location | Number of missiles tested | Outcome | Additional notes | Reference(s) |
|---|---|---|---|---|---|---|
| 1 | 1993 | Unknown | Unknown | Unknown | First reported test of Hwasong-9, but difficult to confirm due to its similar to Hwasong-6. | |
| 2 | 5 September 2016, 12:14 p.m. | Hwangju, North Hwanghae Province | 3 | Success | These missiles flew for nine minutes, achieved 1,000 km (620 mi) range and around 200 km (120 mi) apogee. The launch was supervised by Kim Jong Un. | |
| 3 | 6 March 2017, 7:36 a.m. | Sohae Satellite Launching Station | 4 (or 5) | Success (four missiles); Failure (possible fifth missile) | These missiles were launched simultaneously, achieved 260 km (160 mi) apogee and 1,000 km (620 mi) range. Three of four missiles landed just inside Japan's exclusive economic zone. Kim Jong Un also supervised the launch. It is possible that a fifth missile was launched in this salvo, but it appears to be failed shortly after launch. | |

North Korea may also test Hwasong-9 in 2006, 2009, and 2014, but due to the similarities between their Scud variants, it is difficult to confirm the exact missile used for each launch.
