= Machine Design =

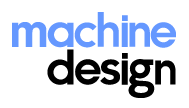
- Type: business magazine
- Format: Print and web-based magazine
- Owner(s): Endeavor Business Media
- Founded: 1929
- Language: English
- Headquarters: New York, New York, USA
- Circulation: 765,000
- ISSN: 0024-9114
- Website: machinedesign.com

Machine Design (ISSN 0024-9114) is an American trade magazine and website serving the OEM engineering market. Its print issues reach qualified design engineers and engineering managers twice a month.

Key technologies covered include computer-aided design and manufacturing (CAD/CAM), electrical and electronics, fastening and joining, fluid power, manufacturing, engineered materials, mechanical engineering, and motion control.

Today, Machine Design is owned by Informa, and has editorial offices based in New York, New York and Cleveland, Ohio, USA.

== History ==
The inaugural issue of Machine Design coincided almost exactly with the 1929 stock-market crash and the beginning of the Great Depression. Although the nation was in the economic doldrums, there was significant design development taking place in almost all industrial segments including automotive, aircraft, farm equipment, home appliances, and industrial machinery.

The onset of World War II came and brought almost frenetic activity to design engineering at large. After the war, civilian industries thrived. But in the years following the war and into the 1950s the role of design engineer languished, stigmatized by the war effort as the creator of new means of destruction.

Engineering colleges began to feel slighted because doctors, lawyers, and business executives were viewed as having more prestige and professional status than their engineering graduates. Intellectual elites viewed engineering colleges as trade schools, and graduate engineers were said to be nothing more than mechanics or glorified shop hands. In response, engineering schools began to drop courses that lacked academic rigor or had the slightest blue-collar aura.
