= Exclusive economic zone of Japan =

Economic zone exclusive to Japan

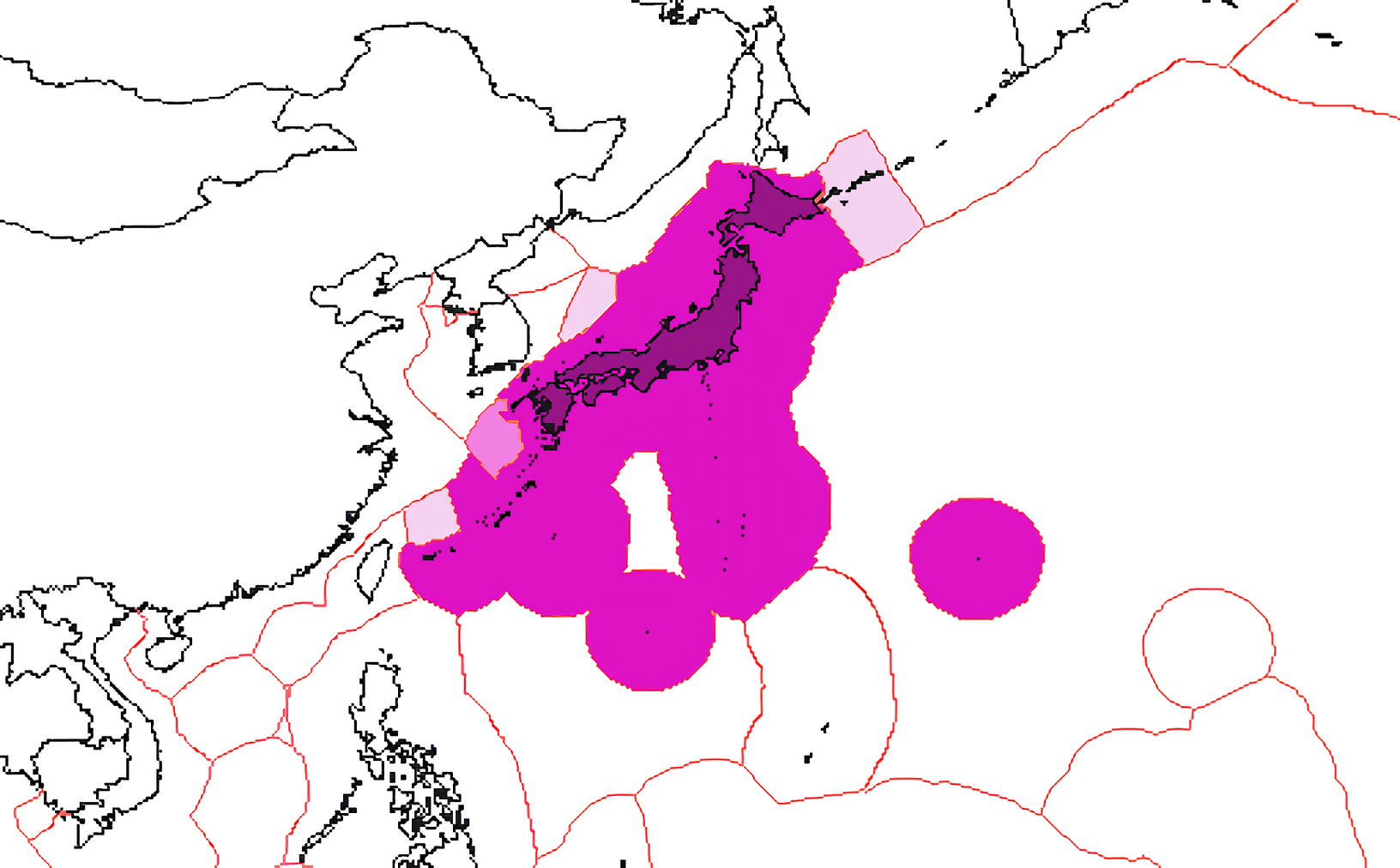
Japan's exclusive economic zones: Japan's EEZ (includes the disputed Okinotorishima EEZ, the lowermost purple near-circle) Joint regime with the Republic of Korea EEZ claimed by Japan but also claimed by other nations

Japan has the eighth-largest exclusive economic zone (EEZ) in the world. The total area of Japan is about 380 thousand km^{2}. Japan's EEZ area is vast and the territorial waters (including the Seto Inland Sea) and EEZ together is about 4.47 million km^{2}.

== Geography ==
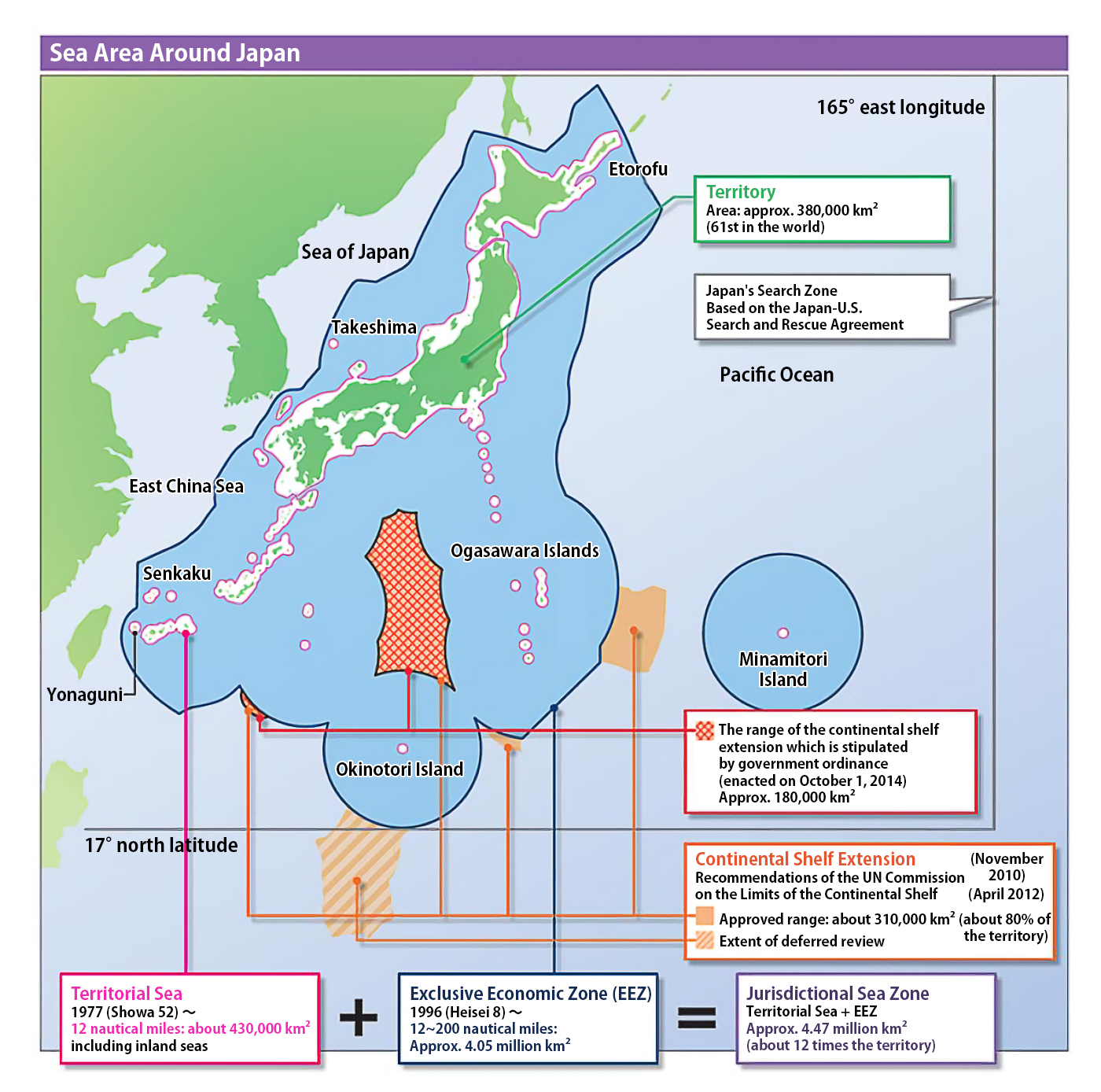
Japan EEZ official map 2016

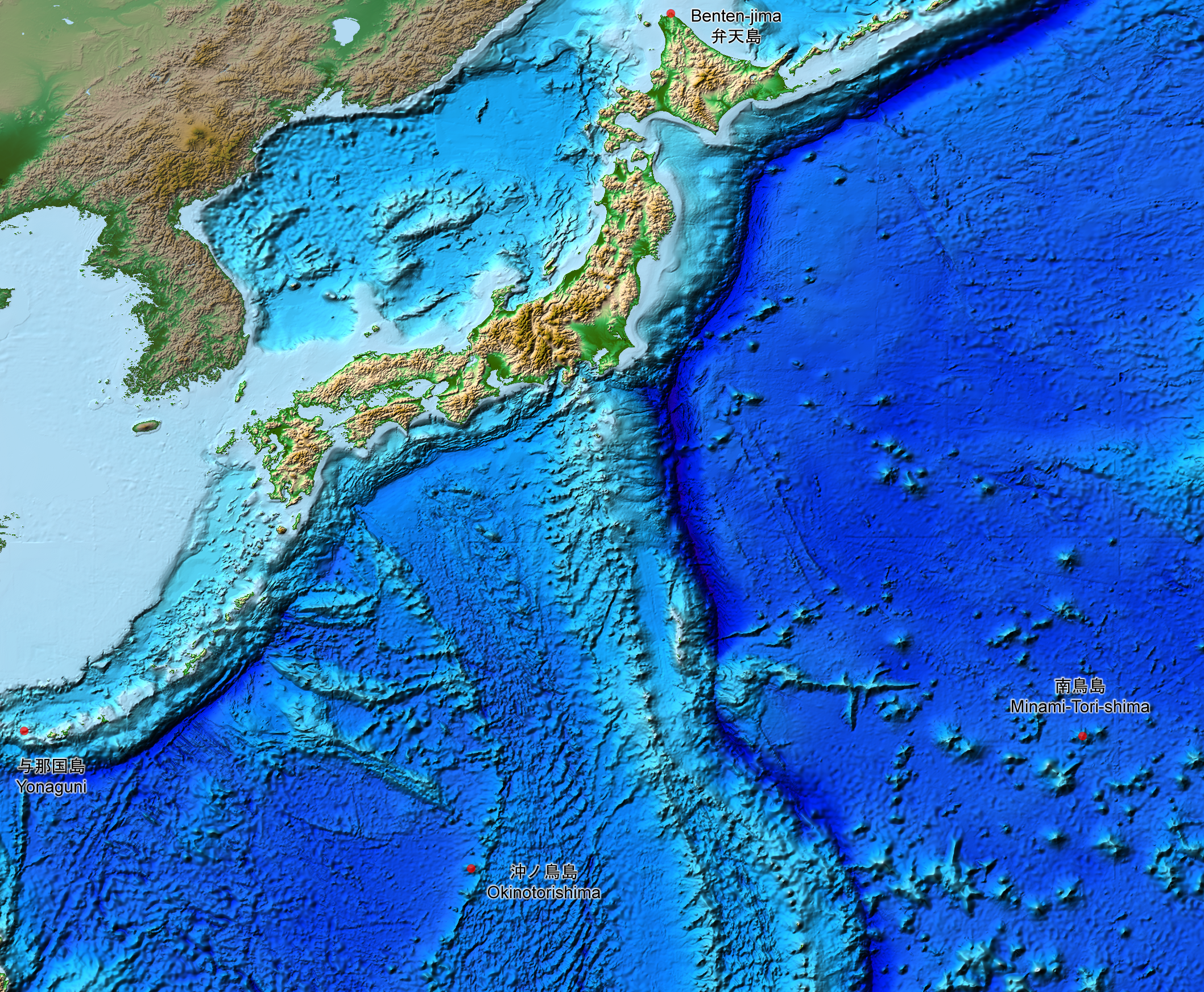
Relief map of the seabed near Japan and the Japanese islands

The Japanese archipelago consists of about 6,852 islands. The Exclusive Economic Zone of Japan includes:

EEZ Areas of Japan
Region	EEZ Area (km^{2})	EEZ Area (sq mi)
Ryukyu Islands	1,394,676	538,487
Pacific Ocean (Japan)	1,162,334	448,780
Nanpō Islands	862,782	333,122
Sea of Japan	630,721	243,523
Minami-Tori-shima	428,875	165,590
Sea of Okhotsk	235	91
Daitō Islands	44	17
Senkaku Islands	7	2.7
Total	4,479,674	1,729,612

== History ==
In the 18th century, Dutch law scholar Cornelius van Bynkershoek wrote in his book "De Dominio Maris Dissertatio" (1702) that the coastal states control the waters within the range of cannons carried on warships of the time. This theory was supported by many countries, and the idea of having three nautical miles from the coastline as the territorial sea was established.

In the 20th century, there have emerged examples of extending the scope of territorial waters, or claiming similar rights in areas beyond the territorial waters. These claims were advocated by Dr. Pardeau, UN Ambassador of the Republic of Malta, at the Second United Nations Conference on the Law of the Sea in 1967. However, Japan, which was an advanced pelagic fishing country, took an opposing position because "wide open seas and narrow territorial waters" matched their national interests at the time.

But later, exploiting the absence of a Japanese EEZ, neighboring countries such as South and North Korea, China and Soviet Union entered the offshore fishing industry and began operating off the coast of Shimane and Tottori Prefectures, making the situation disadvantageous to Japan. Therefore, in 1982, Japan supported the United Nations Convention on the Law of the Sea (UNCLOS) when it was created at the Third United Nations Conference on the Law of the Sea held in Montego Bay, Jamaica, and it came into effect in 1994. The treaty gives Japan the right to explore and develop marine and non-living resources such as mineral resources, within 200 nautical miles of their coastline, and at the same time she is obligated to manage them and prevent marine pollution. The Japanese government signed UNCLOS in February 1983 and Part XI in July 1994. The Convention and Part XI were ratified by the Diet in June 1996.

== Law enforcement and security ==
Japan has contributed to three UNCLOS organizations such as the International Tribunal for the Law of the Sea (ITLOS), the Commission on the Limits of the Continental Shelf (CLCS) and the International Seabed Authority (ISA).

The Japan Maritime Self-Defense Force (JMSDF) and the Japan Coast Guard (JCG) are responsible for protecting the EEZ of Japan. As an island nation, dependent on maritime trade for the majority of its resources, including food and raw materials, maritime operations are a very important aspect of Japanese defense policy. On 30 June 2022, the Japan Ministry of Defense announced the construction of 12 offshore patrol vessel (OPV) by Japan Marine United Corporation (JMU) for the JMSDF. The purpose of this OPV program is to provide enhanced maritime security by boosting JMSDF patrol activities. These vessels are highly automated and configurable to meet a wide range of missions involving “enhanced steady-state intelligence, surveillance, and reconnaissance (ISR) in the waters around Japan.” Under the contract, JMU is charged with delivering the 12 vessels to the JMSDF from fiscal year 2023, which starts on April 1, 2023.

The exclusive economic zone only recognizes the economic, scientific and environmental jurisdiction of the coastal countries and entry of a foreign fishing vessel into the EEZ is not automatically illegal. With regard to the above, a law (fishing sovereignty law, EEZ Fisheries Law) concerning the exercise of sovereign rights regarding fisheries, etc. in the exclusive economic zone (in Japanese) that regulates fisheries of foreigners within the exclusive economic zone of Japan was established on 14 June 1996.

Under the law, fines of 30 million yen or less will be imposed on foreign vessels which conducted unauthorized operation or operation on prohibited waters in the EEZ. It is also a violation of the above law when a foreign fishing vessel escapes by avoiding on-site inspections by fishery supervisor/fishing supervisors on board a fisheries patrol boat (漁業取締船) of the Fisheries Agency, or by the JCG. In this case, a fine of 3 million yen or less will be imposed. Also, the collateral for early release under the bond system is set to the same amount as the fine, and an additional collateral of 6 million yen per kg of illegal coral is set for illegal coral collection.

Increased grey-zone challenges from Japan's neighbors have resulted in greater dependence on the JCG, providing a response that can be more easily resolved diplomatically, and able to justify politically, rather than with an overt military response by the JMSDF.

=== Response to foreign ballistic missiles ===
Anti-ballistic missiles for defense are very expensive, costing 500 million to 2 billion yen per shot. So the launched ballistic missiles are ignored when it is known by radar that they will land on where damage to Japanese nationals and assets are not expected. Also, the nationwide warning system, (J-Alert) will only issue a warning if it is determined that the missile will enter into Japanese territory or waters. J-Alert will not be used when the missile will fall somewhere in Japan's exclusive economic zone.

On August 31, 2022, The Japan Ministry of Defense announced that JMSDF will operate two "Aegis system equipped ships" (イージス・システム搭載艦 in Japanese) to replace the earlier plan of Aegis Ashore installations, commissioning one by the end of fiscal year 2027, and the other by the end of FY2028. The budget for design and other related expenses are to be submitted in the form of “item requests”, without specific amounts, and the initial procurement of the lead items are expected to clear legislation by FY2023. Construction is to begin in the following year of FY2024. At 20,000 tons each, both vessels will be the largest surface combatant warships operated by the JMSDF.

== Disputes ==
Japan has disputes over its EEZ boundaries with all its Asian neighbors (China, Russia, South Korea, and Taiwan), including its claim of an EEZ around Okinotorishima. The above, and relevant maps at the Sea Around Us Project, both indicate Japan's claimed boundaries. The Kuril Islands dispute with Russia has been ongoing since the end of World War 2 with the former Soviet Union. On March 7, 2022, Prime Minister of Japan Fumio Kishida declared that the southern Kurils are "a territory peculiar to Japan, a territory in which Japan has sovereignty."

Japan also refers to various categories of "shipping area" – Smooth Water Area, Coasting Area, Major or Greater Coasting Area, Ocean Going Area – but it is unclear whether these are intended to have any territorial or economic implications.

== Events ==
=== Chinese fired ballistic missiles ===
On 4 August 2022, during military exercises, five ballistic missiles launched by China fell into Japan's exclusive economic zone according to the Japanese government. They landed southwest of Hateruma, close to Taiwan. The exercises were conducted in response to the 2022 visit by Nancy Pelosi to Taiwan and raised tensions in the region. The Japanese government filed formal complaints to Beijing. The Chinese foreign ministry later expressed that boundaries between Japan and China over the waters involved have not been drawn up yet.

=== North Korea fired ballistic missile ===
On 18 November 2022 a ballistic missile launched by North Korea landed in Japan's exclusive economic zone.

== See also ==
- Geography of Japan
