= Engineering consulting =

Expert advice on technical design and systems

Engineering consulting is the practice of performing engineering as a consulting engineer. It assists individuals, public and private companies with process management, idea organization, product design, fabrication, maintenance, repair and operations (MRO), servicing, tech advice, tech specifications, tech estimating, costing, budgeting, valuation, branding, and marketing. Engineering consulting involves an end to end product life cycle (PLM) process, product development management (PDM) tools and other development processing.

Engineering consulting firms may involve civil, structural, mechanical, electrical, environmental, chemical, industrial, and agricultural, electronics and telecom, computer and network, instrumentation and control, information technology, manufacturing and production, aerospace, marine, fire and safety, etc.

== Education ==
In certain countries, the title "consulting engineer" lacks legal protection, while in other countries, it necessitates a minimum of a Bachelor's degree in engineering and a government license.

== See also ==
- International Federation of Consulting Engineers (FIDIC), a standards organization for construction technology and consulting engineering
