= List of missiles by country =

List of guided missiles by country of development

This list of missiles by country groups guided missiles by the country in which they were developed. Joint programmes are listed under each country that made a substantial development contribution. The list includes operational, retired, cancelled and experimental guided missiles, but is not intended to be exhaustive.

For consistency, this list excludes dedicated anti-tank guided missiles, unguided artillery rockets, torpedoes, guided bombs, target drones and decoys, space-launch vehicles, and complete air-defence or launch systems when the missile itself has a separate designation. Systems derived from a missile may be mentioned only where needed to identify the missile. For an alphabetical list by missile name, see list of missiles.

== Argentina ==
Argentina's principal indigenous ballistic-missile efforts were the Cóndor and Alacrán programmes. The Nuclear Threat Initiative identifies the Cóndor II as Argentina's most ambitious ballistic-missile programme and the Falda del Carmen complex as the development site for Cóndor II and Alacrán.

- Cóndor I – sounding-rocket design adapted into a tactical missile programme.
- Cóndor II – cancelled ballistic-missile programme.
- Alacrán – ballistic-missile development tested from CELPA Chamical.

== Australia ==
Australia and the United States are co-development partners on the Precision Strike Missile (PrSM).

- Ikara – anti-submarine missile
- Evolved SeaSparrow Missile (ESSM) – multinational development programme
- Precision Strike Missile – American-Australian
- Hypersonic Attack Cruise Missile – American-Australian

== Brazil ==
Brazil has participated in indigenous and joint missile programmes. Denel describes the A-Darter as a South African design co-funded by Brazil, while the Brazilian Navy describes MANSUP as a nationally developed anti-ship missile.

- A-Darter – short-range air-to-air missile; joint South African-Brazilian programme.
- MANSUP – anti-ship missile developed in Brazil.

== Canada ==
- Velvet Glove – experimental air-to-air missile developed in Canada during the 1950s.

== China ==
China fields a large and diverse force of ballistic and cruise missiles; the inventory below also includes air-to-air, surface-to-air and anti-submarine missiles.

=== Anti-ship and land-attack missiles ===
- HY-2
- YJ-7
- YJ-12
- YJ-18
- YJ-62
- YJ-83
- YJ-91
- CJ-10 / DF-10
- KD-88
- HN-1, HN-2 and HN-3

=== Air-to-air missiles ===
- PL-5
- PL-7
- PL-8
- PL-9
- PL-10
- PL-11
- PL-12
- PL-15
- TY-90

=== Ballistic missiles ===
- DF-3A
- DF-4
- DF-5
- DF-11
- DF-12 / M20
- DF-15
- DF-16
- DF-17
- DF-21
- DF-26
- DF-31, DF-31A and DF-31AG
- DF-41
- JL-1
- JL-2
- JL-3

=== Surface-to-air and anti-submarine missiles ===
- HQ-1
- HQ-2
- HQ-7
- HQ-9
- HQ-10
- HQ-16
- HQ-17
- HQ-61
- KS-1
- LY-60
- QW-1
- QW-2
- CY-1 – anti-submarine missile
- Yu-8 – anti-submarine missile

== France ==
France has developed ballistic, cruise, anti-ship, air-to-air and surface-to-air missiles, including both national and multinational programmes.

- Apache
- AS.20
- AS.30
- ASMP / ASMP-A / ASMP-R
- ASN4G – nuclear-armed air-launched missile under development
- Aster – Franco-Italian family
- Crotale
- Exocet – anti-ship missile family
- Hadès – retired ballistic missile
- M1
- M2
- M20
- M4
- M45
- M51
- Malafon – anti-submarine missile
- Masurca – naval surface-to-air missile
- MdCN / SCALP Naval
- MICA
- Mistral
- Pluton
- R.530
- S1
- S2
- S3
- Super 530
- Martel – Franco-British
- Meteor – multinational European air-to-air missile
- Roland – Franco-German
- Otomat – Franco-Italian
- Sea Venom / ANL – Franco-British
- Storm Shadow / SCALP EG – Franco-British

== Germany ==
Germany is the lead nation for the multinational IRIS-T programme and is a major participant in several other European and transatlantic guided-missile programmes.

- IRIS-T – German-led multinational short-range air-to-air missile.
- IRIS-T SL – surface-launched derivative of IRIS-T.
- IDAS – submarine-launched multi-role guided missile developed by Diehl Defence, ThyssenKrupp Marine Systems and partners.
- RIM-116 RAM – German-American naval point-defence missile.
- Taurus KEPD 350 – German-Swedish air-launched cruise missile developed by TAURUS Systems.
- Meteor – multinational European air-to-air missile.
- 3SM Tyrfing – German-Norwegian anti-ship missile programme.

=== World War II designs ===
- V-1 flying bomb
- V-2 rocket
- Enzian
- Wasserfall
- Ruhrstahl X-4
- Henschel Hs 117 Schmetterling
- Rheintochter
- Feuerlilie

== India ==
India develops a broad range of ballistic and cruise missiles and has collaborated with Russia on the BrahMos programme.

=== Surface-to-Air Missiles ===
- Akash
- Akash-NG
- Barak 8 – Indian-Israeli
- QRSAM
- VL-SRSAM
- VSHORAD
- Kusha
- Prithvi Air Defence / Pradyumna
- Advanced Air Defence / Ashwin
- Prithvi Defence Vehicle (PDV)
- PDV Mk II
- AD-1
- AD-2

=== Air-to-Air Missiles ===
- Astra Mk I
- Astra Mk II
- Astra Mk III / Gandiva

=== Surface-to-Surface and Balastic Missiles ===
- Prithvi-I
- Prithvi-II
- Prithvi-III
- Dhanush
- Agni-I
- Agni-II
- Agni-III
- Agni-IV
- Agni-V
- Agni-P
- K-15 Sagarika
- K-4
- K-5
- Shaurya
- Prahaar
- Pralay

=== Cruise Missiles ===
- Nirbhay
  - Indigenous Technology Cruise Missile (ITCM)
  - Submarine-launched cruise missile (SLCM)
  - Long Range Land Attack Cruise Missile (LR-LACM)
- BrahMos – Indian-Russian
- BrahMos-II – hypersonic missile project
- ET-LDHCM – hypersonic cruise missile programme

=== Air-to-Surface Missiles ===
- ULPGM family
  - ULPGM-V1
  - ULPGM-V2
  - ULPGM-V3
- Rudram family
  - Rudram-I
  - Rudram-II
  - Rudram-III
  - LRSoW

=== Anti-Ship Missiles ===
- NASM-SR
- NASM-MR
- LR-AShM
- SMART – missile-assisted torpedo-delivery weapon

== Iran ==
Iran maintains one of the world's largest inventories of ballistic and cruise missiles; the section below excludes unguided artillery rockets, anti-tank weapons and complete air-defence systems.

=== Ballistic and surface-to-surface missiles ===
- Ashoura
- Dezful
- Emad
- Fateh-110
- Fateh-313
- Fateh Mobin
- Fattah-1
- Ghadr-110
- Haj Qasem
- Hormoz-1
- Hormoz-2
- Khalij Fars
- Kheibar Shekan
- Khorramshahr
- Qiam 1
- Raad-500
- Samen
- Sejjil
- Shahab-1
- Shahab-2
- Shahab-3
- Tondar-69
- Zolfaghar

=== Cruise, anti-ship and air-launched missiles ===
- Fattah-2 – hypersonic manoeuvring weapon
- Fakour-90 – air-to-air missile
- Ghadir – anti-ship cruise missile
- Hoveyzeh
- Jask-2 – submarine-launched cruise missile
- Kowsar – anti-ship missile
- Meshkat
- Nasr-1
- Nasr-e Basir
- Noor
- Qader
- Qased
- Ra'ad
- Soumar
- Ya-Ali
- Zafar
- Zoobin

=== Surface-to-air missiles ===
- Misagh-1
- Misagh-2
- Misagh-3
- Sayyad-1
- Sayyad-2
- Sayyad-3
- Sayyad-4
- Shahin
- Shalamcheh
- Taer 2

== Iraq ==
Under Saddam Hussein, Iraq developed or modified a series of ballistic missiles, particularly derivatives of the Soviet Scud, and later worked on short-range systems under United Nations range restrictions.

- Al-Samoud 2
- Ababil-100 / Al-Fat'h
- Al Hussein
- Al Abbas
- Badr 2000 – Iraqi designation for the multinational Cóndor II project.

== Israel ==
Israel has developed ballistic, cruise, air-defence and anti-ship missiles, among other guided weapons.

- Arrow – anti-ballistic missile
- Barak 1 – naval surface-to-air missile
- Barak 8 – Indian-Israeli surface-to-air missile
- Barak MX – modular surface-to-air missile system
- Delilah
- Derby
- Gabriel
- Tamir – Iron Dome interceptor
- Stunner – David's Sling interceptor
- Jericho II
- Jericho III
- LORA
- Popeye
- Python 5
- SkySniper
- Sea Breaker

== Italy ==
Italian industry participates in several major European missile programmes. MBDA describes CAMM-ER as a British-Italian development, ASTER as a long-running European programme involving Italy, and the TESEO/OTOMAT family as designed in Italy.

- Aspide – predecessor surface-to-air missile replaced in Italian service by CAMM-ER-based systems.
- CAMM-ER – British-Italian extended-range surface-to-air missile.
- Otomat / TESEO – Italian anti-ship missile family.
- Aster – Franco-Italian/European surface-to-air and anti-ballistic missile family.
- Meteor – multinational European air-to-air missile.

== Japan ==
Japan completed development and began deploying the Type-25 SSM and Type-25 HVGP in March 2026.

- AAM-1
- AAM-2 – cancelled
- AAM-3
- AAM-4 / AAM-4B
- AAM-5 / AAM-5B
- ASM-1
- ASM-1C
- ASM-2 / ASM-2B
- ASM-3 / ASM-3A
- Type 81 / SAM-1
- Type 91 / SAM-2
- Type 93 / SAM-3
- Type 03 / SAM-4
- Type 11
- Type 88 / SSM-1
- Type 90 / SSM-1B
- Type 12 surface-to-ship missile
- Type 17 / SSM-2
- Type-25 SSM
- Type-25 HVGP
- SM-3 Block IIA – joint Japanese-American development
- Type 07 – anti-submarine missile

== North Korea ==
North Korea operates a large family of short-, medium-, intermediate- and intercontinental-range ballistic missiles as well as cruise, surface-to-air and anti-ship missiles.

=== Ballistic missiles ===
- Hwasong-5
- Hwasong-6
- Hwasong-7
- Hwasong-9
- Hwasong-11
- Hwasong-11A / KN-23
- Hwasong-11B / KN-24
- Hwasong-11C
- Hwasong-11D
- Hwasong-11S
- Hwasong-8
- Hwasong-10
- Hwasong-12
- Hwasong-12B
- Hwasong-16B
- Hwasong-13
- Hwasong-14
- Hwasong-15
- Hwasong-17
- Hwasong-18
- Hwasong-19
- Pukguksong-1
- Pukguksong-2
- Pukguksong-3
- Pukguksong-4
- Pukguksong-5

=== Cruise, surface-to-air and anti-ship missiles ===
- Hwasal-1
- Hwasal-2
- Pulhwasal-3-31
- Pongae-5 / KN-06
- Pyoljji-1-2
- Kumsong-3 / KN-19
- Padasuri-6

== Norway ==
- Penguin
- Naval Strike Missile (NSM)
- Joint Strike Missile (JSM)
- 3SM Tyrfing – Norwegian-German anti-ship missile programme; Norway leads the project.

== Pakistan ==
Pakistan's missile force is centered on mobile short- and medium-range ballistic missiles and an expanding cruise-missile inventory.

- Anza Mk 1 / Mk 2 / Mk 3
- Hatf-I
- Nasr / Hatf-IX
- Abdali / Hatf-II
- Ghaznavi / Hatf-III
- Shaheen-I
- Ghauri I / Hatf-V
- Ghauri-II
- Ababeel
- Shaheen-II
- Shaheen-III
- Harbah
- Babur family / Hatf-VII
- Ra'ad / Hatf-VIII
- Ra'ad-II
- Barq – air-to-surface missile

== Poland ==
- Grom
- Piorun – Polish MANPADS developed and produced by MESKO.

== Russia ==
Russia operates and develops a wide range of ballistic, cruise, air-to-air and surface-to-air missiles. Legacy missiles designed in the Soviet Union are listed separately below rather than being retroactively attributed to Russia.

=== Ballistic and hypersonic missiles ===
- RT-2PM2 Topol-M
- RS-24 Yars
- RS-28 Sarmat
- RS-26 Rubezh
- 9M723 Iskander-M
- Kh-47M2 Kinzhal
- Avangard
- Oreshnik – operational IRBM first used in combat in 2024.

=== Cruise and anti-ship missiles ===
- P-800 Oniks
- 3M-54 Kalibr / Klub
- 3M14 Kalibr
- 3M22 Zircon
- Kh-35
- Kh-101 / Kh-102
- 9M729
- BrahMos – Russian-Indian

=== Air-to-air missiles ===
- R-37
- R-77

=== Surface-to-air missiles ===
- 9M336 / Verba
- 40N6 / 48N6 family
- 77N6 family

== South Africa ==
South Africa's Denel Dynamics has developed indigenous air-to-air and surface-to-air guided missiles. The A-Darter was developed by Denel with Brazilian co-funding, while Umkhonto is Denel's vertically launched surface-to-air missile family.

- A-Darter – South African-Brazilian short-range air-to-air missile.
- Umkhonto – vertically launched surface-to-air missile family.

== South Korea ==
South Korea has developed ballistic and cruise missile families for precision strike as well as indigenous air-defence and anti-ship missiles.

- Cheolmae-2 / KM-SAM
- Chiron
- C-Star
- L-SAM
- KAGM
- Haeseong I
- Haeseong II
- Haeseong III
- Hongsangeo / Red Shark – missile-delivered anti-submarine torpedo
- NHK-1 / Baekgom
- NHK-2 / Hyunmoo-1
- Hyunmoo-2A
- Hyunmoo-2B
- Hyunmoo-2C
- Hyunmoo-3A
- Hyunmoo-3B
- Hyunmoo-3C
- Hyunmoo-3D
- Hyunmoo-4
- K-SAAM
- Leaflet
- Tactical Flag

== Soviet Union ==
The Soviet Union developed many of the missile families inherited by the Russian Federation and other successor states. Missiles first developed after 1991 are listed under the relevant successor country. Contemporary U.S./NATO designation records document the principal Soviet surface-to-surface, air-to-air, surface-to-air and anti-ship missile families listed below.

=== Ballistic missiles ===
- R-1
- R-2
- R-5
- R-7
- R-11 / Scud-A
- R-12
- R-14
- R-16
- R-17 / Scud-B
- R-21
- R-27 / Zyb
- R-29
- R-36
- R-36M
- UR-100
- UR-100N
- RT-2
- RT-2PM Topol
- OTR-21 Tochka

=== Cruise and anti-ship missiles ===
- P-5 Pyatyorka
- P-15 Termit
- P-35
- P-120 Malakhit
- P-270 Moskit
- P-500 Bazalt
- P-700 Granit
- Kh-20
- Kh-22
- Kh-23
- Kh-25
- Kh-28
- Kh-29
- Kh-31
- Kh-55
- Kh-59

=== Air-to-air missiles ===
- K-5
- K-13
- R-23 / R-24
- R-27
- R-33
- R-60
- R-73

=== Surface-to-air missiles ===
- 5V7 / S-25
- V-750 / S-75
- 5V24 / S-125
- 3M8 / 2K11 Krug
- 3M9 / 2K12 Kub
- 9M31
- 9M32
- 9M33
- 9M37
- 9M38 / Buk
- 9M39 / Igla
- 9M330 / Tor
- 5V55 / 48N6 / S-300 family

== Sweden ==
Sweden's modern missile industry is centered on Saab, which develops the RBS 70 and RBS 15 families and participates in multinational programmes including Meteor and TAURUS.

- RBS 70 – short-range surface-to-air missile family.
  - Bolide
  - Bolide 2 – new-generation missile introduced in 2026; deliveries are scheduled to start in 2027.
- RBS-15 – Swedish anti-ship/land-attack missile family.
- IRIS-T / Rb 98 – multinational European programme led by Germany, with Swedish participation.
- Meteor / Rb 101 – multinational European air-to-air missile.
- Taurus KEPD 350 – German-Swedish air-launched cruise missile.

== Switzerland ==
Swiss firms Oerlikon and Contraves developed a series of experimental surface-to-air missiles during the early Cold War. The better-documented later designs include the RSD 58 and RSE Kriens.

- RSC/RSD 58 – beam-riding surface-to-air missile developed by Oerlikon-Contraves.
- RSE Kriens – follow-on Swiss surface-to-air missile project.

== Taiwan ==
Taiwan has developed indigenous anti-ship, land-attack, ballistic and air-launched missiles.

- Hsiung Feng I / IA
- Hsiung Feng II
- Hsiung Feng IIE
- Hsiung Feng III
- Sky Bow I
- Sky Bow II
- Sky Bow III
- Sky Bow IV
- Sky Spear / Tien Chi
- Sky Horse
- Sky Sword I
- TC-1L
- Sea TC-1
- Sky Sword II
- TC-2A
- TC-2N
- TC-2C
- Wan Chien
- Yun Feng

== Turkey ==
Roketsan's current portfolio includes cruise, air-defence, ballistic and guided-artillery missiles; dedicated anti-tank missiles and guided bombs are excluded here.

- Cirit – laser-guided missile.
- METE – miniature laser-guided missile.
- Bora / KHAN – tactical ballistic missile.
- Tayfun – ballistic missile.
- Sungur – surface-to-air missile.
- Hisar-A – surface-to-air missile.
- Hisar-O RF – surface-to-air missile.
- SİPER Block 1 and Block 2 – long-range air-defence missiles.
- SOM – stand-off/cruise missile.
- Çakır – cruise-missile family.
- Atmaca – anti-ship missile.
- Kara Atmaca – surface-to-surface cruise missile.
- TRLG-122 – laser-guided artillery missile.
- TRLG-230 – laser-guided artillery missile.
- TRG-300 – guided artillery missile.

== Ukraine ==
Ukraine has expanded domestic missile development during the Russo-Ukrainian war. Official Ukrainian sources in 2026 identified Neptune, Vilkha, Ruta, Peklo, Palianytsia and other domestically produced long-range weapons.

- Dnipro
- Hrim-2 / Sapsan
- R-360 Neptune
- Long Neptune – extended-range Neptune variant
- Vilkha
- Palianytsia – missile-drone
- Peklo – missile-drone
- Ruta – cruise missile / missile-drone
- Bars – cruise missile-drone
- Flamingo – ground-launched cruise missile

== United Kingdom ==
The United Kingdom has produced both national and multinational missile programmes, including Storm Shadow, SPEAR 3 and Meteor.

- ALARM
- ASRAAM
- Bloodhound
- Blowpipe
- Blue Steel
- Blue Streak
- Blue Water
- Brakemine – cancelled World War II surface-to-air missile project
- Brimstone
- CAMM
- Fairey Fireflash
- Fairey Stooge
- Fire Shadow
- Firestreak
- Green Cheese
- Javelin
- Lightweight Multirole Missile
- Martlet
- Martel – Franco-British
- Meteor – multinational European programme
- Sea Cat
- Sea Dart
- Sea Eagle
- Sea Skua
- Sea Slug
- Sea Venom / ANL – Franco-British
- Sea Wolf
- Skyflash
- SPEAR 3
- Starburst
- Starstreak
- Storm Shadow / SCALP EG – Franco-British
- Thunderbird
- UB.109T – cancelled cruise missile

== United States ==
The United States section is limited to guided missiles and missile interceptors. Designation-history tables, target drones, decoys, guided bombs, sounding rockets, boosters, probes and other non-missile vehicles are omitted. For missiles currently in service, see also List of active missiles of the United States military.

=== Air-to-air missiles ===
- AIM-4 Falcon
- AIM-7 Sparrow
- AIM-9 Sidewinder
- AIM-26 Falcon
- AIM-47 Falcon
- AIM-54 Phoenix
- AIM-120 AMRAAM
- AIM-174B Gunslinger – long-range air-to-air derivative of SM-6, developed by the U.S. Navy.
- AIM-260 JATM – advanced air-to-air missile programme

=== Air-to-surface, cruise and anti-ship missiles ===
- AGM-12 Bullpup
- AGM-28 Hound Dog
- AGM-45 Shrike
- AGM-53 Condor
- AGM-65 Maverick
- AGM-69 SRAM
- AGM-78 Standard ARM
- AGM/RGM/UGM-84 Harpoon
- AGM-86 ALCM
- AGM-88 HARM
- AGM-122 Sidearm
- AGM-129 ACM
- AGM-130
- AGM-136 Tacit Rainbow
- AGM-137 TSSAM
- AGM-158 JASSM
- AGM-158C LRASM
- AGM-176 Griffin
- AGM-183 ARRW – hypersonic missile programme
- BGM/RGM/UGM-109 Tomahawk
- Regulus I
- SSM-N-9 Regulus II
- MGM-1 Matador
- MGM-13 Mace
- SM-62 Snark

=== Surface-to-air and missile-defence interceptors ===
- MIM-3 Nike Ajax
- RIM-2 Terrier
- RIM-8 Talos
- CIM-10 Bomarc
- MIM-14 Nike Hercules
- MIM-23 Hawk
- RIM-24 Tartar
- FIM-43 Redeye
- MIM-46 Mauler
- LIM-49 Spartan
- RIM-66 Standard
- RIM-67 Standard
- MIM-72 Chaparral
- FIM-92 Stinger
- MIM-104 Patriot
- RIM-116 Rolling Airframe Missile – German-American
- RIM-156 SM-2ER Block IV
- RIM-161 Standard Missile 3
- RIM-162 ESSM – multinational
- RIM-174 / SM-6
- Ground-Based Interceptor
- Sprint
- THAAD interceptor

=== Ballistic, tactical and hypersonic missiles ===
- PGM-11 Redstone
- PGM-17 Thor
- SM-65 Atlas
- PGM-19 Jupiter
- HGM-25A Titan I
- LGM-25C Titan II
- UGM-27 Polaris
- Minuteman I, II and III
- Pershing I
- Pershing II
- UGM-73 Poseidon
- UGM-96 Trident I
- UGM-133 Trident II
- LGM-118 Peacekeeper
- MGM-134 Midgetman
- MGM-140 ATACMS
- Precision Strike Missile (PrSM) – next-generation long-range surface-to-surface missile; Increment 1 completed initial operational test and evaluation in 2025.
- LGM-35 Sentinel – ICBM under development
- Dark Eagle – U.S. Army long-range hypersonic weapon.

=== Anti-submarine missiles ===
- UUM-44 SUBROC
- RUR-5 ASROC
- RUM-139 VL-ASROC

== See also ==
- List of missiles
- List of anti-tank missiles
- List of active missiles of the United States military
- List of surface-to-air missiles
- List of anti-ship missiles
- List of ballistic missiles
- List of cruise missiles
