= Ya Ali =

Ya Ali (Arabic: يَا عَلِيّ, romanized: Yā ʿAlī) may refer to

- Ya Ali (phrase), a phrase used by Shia Muslims invoking Ali, the first Shia Imam
- "Ya Ali", a song by Zubeen Garg from the 2006 Indian film Gangster: A Love Story
- Ya-Ali (missile), an Iranian missile
- Ya Ali Popular Formations, a Shia militant group
- Ya Ali Gavabar, a village in Iran
