= Quds cruise missile =

Cruise missile

Quds land-attack cruise missile
- Place of origin: Yemen

Service history
- In service: July 2019
- Used by: Houthis

Production history
- Manufacturer: Iran, Houthis

Specifications
- Engine: Toloue 10 or 13 type
- Guidance system: TERCOM navigation system

The Quds are a family of Iranian cruise missiles, primarily used to attack land based targets.

== Quds-1 ==
Quds-1, designated '351' by the US Government, is a land-attack cruise missile used by Houthi movement in Yemen. The Houthis claim that they have developed it themselves, but some sources disagree. A UN Panel of Experts report in 2020 presented evidence that the Quds-1 missile's components were made in Iran.

=== Design ===
According to missile expert Fabian Hinz it could be a copy of the Iranian Soumar missile or the Russian Kh-55. However, the size of the missile is smaller than the Iranian one, and its range is much shorter due to having less room aboard for fuel, and due to being a ground-launched rather than an air-launched cruise missile. He added that there are differences between the Soumar missile and the Quds-1 missile like "the entire booster design, the wing position, the Quds 1's fixed wings, the shape of the nose cone, the shape of the aft fuselage, the position of the stabilizers and the shape of the engine cover and exhaust". According to Fabian Hinz the range of Quds-1 is "significantly" smaller than the Iranian Soumar.

The primary engine is an unlicensed copy of the PBS TJ100 turbojet produced by PBS Velká Bíteš in Czechia.

A "Quds cruise missile" was amongst the long-range unmanned aerial vehicles (UAV) the Houthis displayed to the media in July 2019. Jane's Defence Weekly described it as shorter with differently shaped wings and fins, engine mounted on top rather than inside, and a smaller rocket launch booster compared to the Iranian Ya Ali. The fins looked similar to the missile used in the Abha International Airport attack the previous month.

Iran Watch asserts that the Quds-1 is the Houthi name for the Iranian Paveh cruise missile, and that the missiles are visually identical.

== Quds-2 ==
The Quds-2 cruise missile is also used by Yemen, and is supposed to be a more advanced version of the Quds-1, with higher speed, and range.

In June 2024, it was discovered that Iran-backed militias in Iraq possessed Quds-2 cruise missiles. This came to light when Iraqi police in Babil found and photographed a Quds-2 cruise missile that had failed to launch.

== Quds-3 ==
In 2022, the Quds-3 cruise missile was displayed at a Houthi military parade in Sanaa, Yemen.

== See also ==
- Houthi insurgency in Yemen
- Saudi Arabian-led intervention in Yemen
