= Meshkat (missile) =

Medium-range cruise missile

The Meshkat (Persian: مشکات, meaning "Lantern") is a medium-range cruise missile built by Iran.

The missile can be fired from ground, air and sea and will have a range of 2000 km.

On 2015 a long-range cruise missile was revealed under the name "Soumar (missile)" which possibly is the more matured type of Meshkat. The range of the missile was not mentioned. Haaretz newspaper claimed the design closely resembles the Kh-55 that Iran acquired from Ukraine in 2001. Because of the similarities media guess a range between 2000 and 3000 km for it.

== See also ==
- Hoveyzeh (cruise missile)
- Ya-Ali (missile)
