= Ballistic missile =

Missile that follows a sub-orbital ballistic flightpath

Minuteman-III MIRV launch sequence: 1. The missile launches out of its silo by firing its first-stage boost motor (A).; 2. About 60 seconds after launch, the first-stage drops off and the second-stage motor (B) ignites. The missile shroud (E) is ejected.; 3. About 120 seconds after launch, the third-stage motor (C) ignites and separates from the second stage.; 4. About 180 seconds after launch, third-stage thrust terminates and the post-boost vehicle (D) separates from the rocket.; 5. The post-boost vehicle maneuvers itself and prepares for re-entry vehicle (RV) deployment.; 6. The RVs, as well as decoys and chaff, are deployed.; 7. The RVs (now armed) and chaff re-enter the atmosphere at high speeds.; 8. The nuclear warheads detonate.

A ballistic missile is a type of missile that follows a ballistic trajectory and is powered only during a relatively brief initial period—most of the flight is unpowered. Short-range ballistic missiles (SRBM) typically stay within the Earth's atmosphere, while most larger missiles travel outside the atmosphere. The type of ballistic missile with the greatest range is an intercontinental ballistic missile (ICBM). The largest ICBMs are capable of full orbital flight.

These missiles are in a distinct category from cruise missiles, which are aerodynamically guided in powered flight and thus restricted to the atmosphere.

== History ==
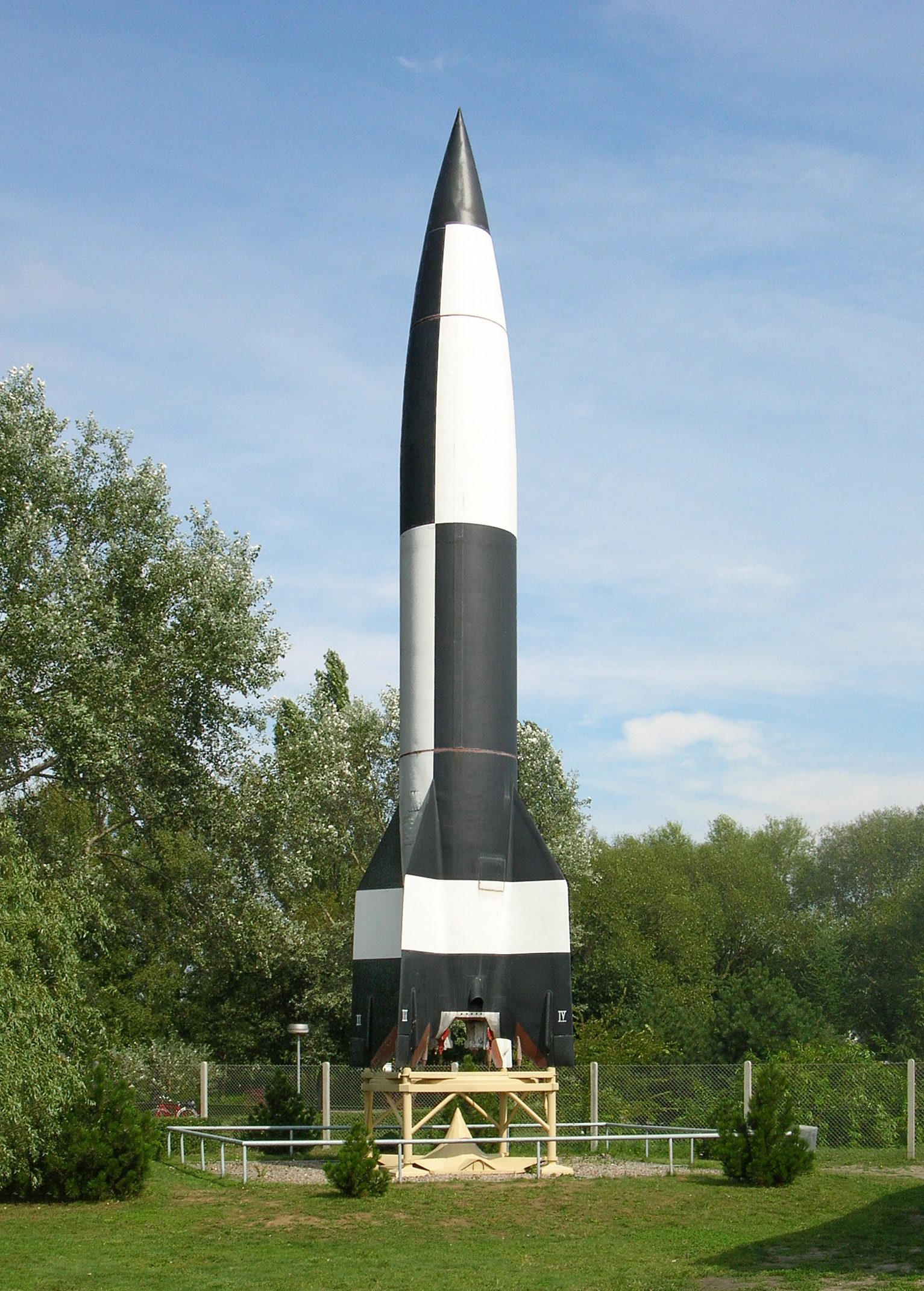
Replica V-2

Ballistic missiles developed from earlier rocket artillery and from the study of ballistics. Rockets had been used as weapons for centuries, including in China, the Kingdom of Mysore, and nineteenth-century European armies, but these weapons were unguided and short-ranged compared with later ballistic missiles. Modern ballistic missiles emerged from twentieth-century liquid-fuel rocketry and share the same fundamental design principles as all Launch vehicles. Their development was driven in part by the desire to deliver explosive payloads over long distances without relying on crewed aircraft.

=== V-2 and the Second World War ===
One of the first operational ballistic missiles was the German Aggregat 4 (A-4), better known as the V-2. It was developed by Nazi Germany during the 1930s and 1940s under a program associated with Wernher von Braun and Walter Dornberger. The first successful A-4 launch took place on 3 October 1942.

The V-2 entered combat use in September 1944. The first V-2 used in combat was fired against Paris on 6 September 1944, and attacks against London began two days later. Because it followed a high, fast ballistic trajectory and travelled faster than sound, the V-2 could not be intercepted by wartime air defenses. A vertically launched V-2, MW 18014, became the first human-made object to reach outer space on 20 June 1944.

After the war, the United States, the Soviet Union, and other states examined captured German missiles, documents, and personnel. This postwar transfer of V-2 technology influenced both military missile programs and early spaceflight programs.

=== Cold War strategic missiles ===
During the Cold War, ballistic missile development became central to the nuclear competition between the United States and the Soviet Union. Early postwar missiles were limited by range, accuracy, reliability, and launch preparation time, but rapid advances in propulsion, guidance, and warhead design led to increasingly capable medium-range ballistic missiles, intermediate-range ballistic missiles, and intercontinental ballistic missiles (ICBMs).

The Soviet R-7 Semyorka was the first ICBM to complete a successful flight, on 21 August 1957. A modified R-7 launched Sputnik 1, the first artificial satellite, on 4 October 1957, linking early ICBM development with the beginning of the Space Age. The United States developed its own early ICBMs, including Atlas and Titan, followed by the solid-fuel Minuteman family.

Solid-fuel missiles improved readiness because they could be stored for longer periods and launched more quickly than many earlier liquid-fuel missiles. The Minuteman III became operational in 1970 and was the first missile to carry multiple independently targetable reentry vehicles (MIRVs). MIRVs allowed a single missile to deliver several warheads against separate targets and became an important factor in strategic nuclear planning and missile defense debates.

=== Submarine-launched missiles ===
The development of submarine-launched ballistic missiles (SLBMs) added a sea-based component to nuclear deterrence. The United States Navy developed the solid-fuel Polaris missile for launch from submerged ballistic missile submarines. USS George Washington conducted the first submerged Polaris launch on 20 July 1960 and departed on the first U.S. ballistic missile submarine deterrent patrol on 15 November 1960. SLBMs increased the survivability of nuclear forces by placing missiles on mobile and concealed platforms at sea.

Later SLBM systems, including Poseidon and Trident, increased range, accuracy, and payload compared with Polaris. The Soviet Union and other nuclear-armed states also developed submarine-launched ballistic missile forces during the Cold War.

=== Arms control and proliferation ===
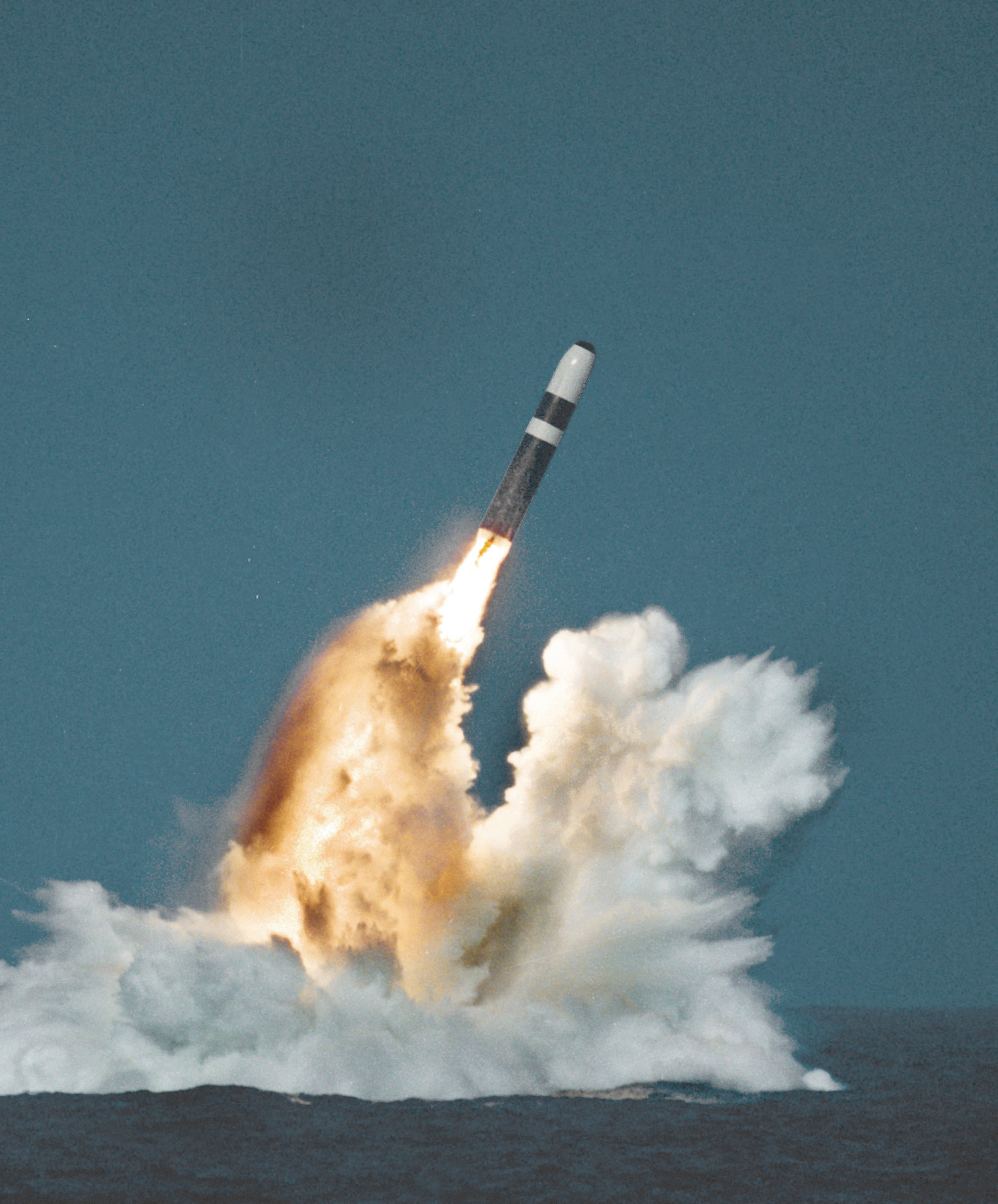
Trident II SLBM launched by ballistic missile submarine

Ballistic missiles became a major subject of arms control agreements. The Intermediate-Range Nuclear Forces Treaty (INF Treaty), signed by the United States and the Soviet Union in 1987, required the elimination of their ground-launched ballistic and cruise missiles with ranges between 500 and 5,500 kilometers. Strategic ballistic missiles were also covered by later strategic arms agreements, including the Strategic Arms Reduction Treaty process and New START.

Outside the U.S.–Soviet and U.S.–Russian strategic competition, shorter-range ballistic missiles proliferated widely. The Soviet Scud and its derivatives became especially common. Scud-type missiles were used during the Iran–Iraq War, including attacks on cities, and Iraq used modified Scud variants during the Gulf War.

=== Twenty-first century use ===
In the twenty-first century, ballistic missiles have remained part of both strategic arsenals and regional conflicts. They have been used or tested by states including Russia, Ukraine, Iran, North Korea, India, Pakistan, and others. During the Russian invasion of Ukraine, both ballistic and cruise missiles were used in long-range strikes, while Iran used ballistic missiles in direct attacks on Israel in 2024 and 2025. The continued spread and use of ballistic missiles has kept missile defense, early warning, and arms control central to international security debates.

== Flight ==
In order to cover large distances, ballistic missiles are usually launched into a high sub-orbital spaceflight; for intercontinental missiles, the highest altitude (apogee) reached during free-flight is about 4,500 kilometers (2,800 mi). A ballistic missile's trajectory consists of three parts or phases: the boost phase, the mid-course phase and the terminal phase. Special systems and capabilities are required to facilitate the successful passage from one phase to the other.

The boost phase is the powered flight portion, beginning with the ignition of the engines and concluding with the end of powered flight. The powered flight portion can last from a few tenths of seconds to several minutes and can consist of multiple rocket stages. Internal computers keep the missile aligned on a preprogrammed trajectory. On multi-stage missiles, stage separation (excluding any post-boost vehicles or MIRV bus) occurs primarily during the boost phase.

The mid-course phase is the longest in the missile's trajectory, beginning with the conclusion of powered flight. When the fuel is exhausted, no more thrust is provided and the missile enters free flight. During this phase the missile, now largely consisting of a warhead or payload and possibly defensive countermeasures and small propulsion systems for further alignment toward its target, will reach its highest altitude and may travel in space for thousands of kilometers (or even indefinitely, in the case of some fractional-orbital capable systems) at speeds of up to 7.5 to 10 kilometres per second (4 to 5 nautical miles per second).

The last phase in the missile's trajectory is the terminal or re-entry phase, beginning with the re-entry of the missile into the Earth's atmosphere (if exoatmospheric) where atmospheric drag plays a significant part in missile trajectory, and lasts until missile impact. Re-entry vehicles re-enter the Earth's atmosphere at very high velocities, on the order of 6–8 kilometers per second (22,000–29,000 km/h; 13,000–18,000 mph) at intercontinental ballistic missile ranges. During the beginning of this phase, the missile's trajectory is still relatively well defined, though as the missile reaches the heavier layers of atmosphere it is increasingly influenced by gravity and aerodynamic drag, which can affect its landing.

== Types ==
Ballistic missiles can be launched from fixed sites or mobile launchers, including vehicles (e.g., transporter erector launchers), aircraft, ships, and submarines. Ballistic missiles vary widely in range and use, and are often divided into categories based on range. Various schemes are used by different countries to categorize the ranges of ballistic missiles:

- Tactical ballistic missile (TBM): Range less than 300 kilometres (190 mi)
- Short-range ballistic missile (SRBM): Range from 300 to 1,000 kilometres (190 to 620 mi)
- Medium-range ballistic missile (MRBM): Range from 1,000 to 3,500 kilometres (620 to 2,170 mi)
- Intermediate-range ballistic missile (IRBM): Range from 3,500 to 5,500 kilometres (2,200 to 3,400 mi)
- Intercontinental ballistic missile (ICBM): Range greater than 5,500 kilometres (3,400 mi)

Long- and medium-range ballistic missiles are generally designed to deliver nuclear weapons because their payload is too limited for conventional explosives to be cost-effective in comparison to conventional bomber aircraft.

== Quasi-ballistic missiles ==
A quasi-ballistic missile is a type of ballistic missile that follows a shallow, largely ballistic trajectory while remaining guided during flight and capable of sustained maneuvering within the atmosphere. These maneuvers can alter the missile's altitude, direction, or range, improving accuracy and complicating interception. Some large guided MLRS rockets, particularly those with ranges comparable to short-range ballistic missiles, blur the traditional distinction between rocket artillery and ballistic missiles and are categorized as quasi-ballistic missiles.

=== Examples ===
India

- Pralay (active)
- Long Range – Anti-Ship Missile (under development)

Israel

- LORA (active)

North Korea

- Hwasong-11A (active)

United States

- MGM-140 ATACMS (active)
- Precision Strike Missile (active)
- RIM-174 Standard ERAM (SM-6) when used for surface-attack (active)

== Hypersonic ballistic missile ==
Many ballistic missiles reach hypersonic speeds (i.e. Mach 5 and above) when they re-enter the atmosphere from space. However, in common military terminology, the term "hypersonic ballistic missile" is generally only given to those that can sustain hypersonic speeds throughout the majority of duration of flight, often with maneuvering capability that allows them to avoid following a simple ballistic trajectory.

== Throw-weight ==
Throw-weight is a measure of the effective weight of ballistic missile payloads. It is measured in kilograms or tonnes. Throw-weight equals the total weight of a missile's warheads, reentry vehicles, self-contained dispensing mechanisms, penetration aids, and any other components that are part of the delivered payload, and not of the rocket itself (such as the launch rocket booster and launch fuel). Throw-weight may refer to any type of warhead, but in normal modern usage, it refers almost exclusively to nuclear or thermonuclear payloads. It was once also a consideration in the design of naval ships and the number and size of their guns.

Throw-weight was used as a criterion in classifying different types of missiles during Strategic Arms Limitation Talks between the Soviet Union and the United States. The term became politically controversial during debates over the arms control accord, as critics of the treaty alleged that Soviet missiles were able to carry larger payloads and so enabled the Soviets to maintain higher throw-weight than an American force with a roughly comparable number of lower-payload missiles.

The missiles with the world's heaviest payloads are the Russian SS-18 and Chinese CSS-4 and as of 2017, Russia was developing a new heavy-lift, liquid-propellant ICBM called the Sarmat.

=== Depressed trajectory ===
Example of depressed trajectory: Fractional orbital bombardment system

Throw-weight is normally calculated using an optimal ballistic trajectory from one point on the surface of the Earth to another. A "minimum-energy trajectory" maximizes the total payload (throw-weight) using the available impulse of the missile. By reducing the payload weight, different trajectories can be selected, which can either increase the nominal range or decrease the total time in flight.

A depressed trajectory is non-optimal, as a lower and flatter trajectory takes less time between launch and impact but has a lower throw-weight. The primary reasons to choose a depressed trajectory are to evade anti-ballistic missile systems by reducing the time available to shoot down the attacking vehicle (especially during the vulnerable burn-phase against space-based ABM systems) or a nuclear first-strike scenario. An alternate, non-military purpose for a depressed trajectory is in conjunction with the spaceplane concept with use of airbreathing jet engines, which requires the ballistic missile to remain low enough inside the atmosphere for air-breathing engines to function.

In contrast, a "lofted" trajectory is frequently used for testing purposes, as it reduces the range of the missile (allowing for a controlled and observed impact), as well as signals a lack of hostile intention with the test.

== Combat use ==
The following ballistic missiles have been used in combat:

- Ghadr-110
- LORA
- MGM-140 ATACMS
- OTR-21 Tochka
- Qaher-1/2M
- Scud
- V-2
- Zolfaghar
- Kh-47M2 Kinzhal
- Oreshnik
- Hwasong-11A

== See also ==
- MIRV
- NATO reporting name (has lists of various Soviet missiles)
- Surface-to-surface missile
- Weapons of mass destruction
- List of currently active missiles of the United States military
- List of ICBMs
- List of missiles
- List of missiles by nation
- List of NATO reporting names for ballistic missile submarines
- Missile guidance
