= Lethal Miniature Aerial Missile System =

Man-portable loitering munition

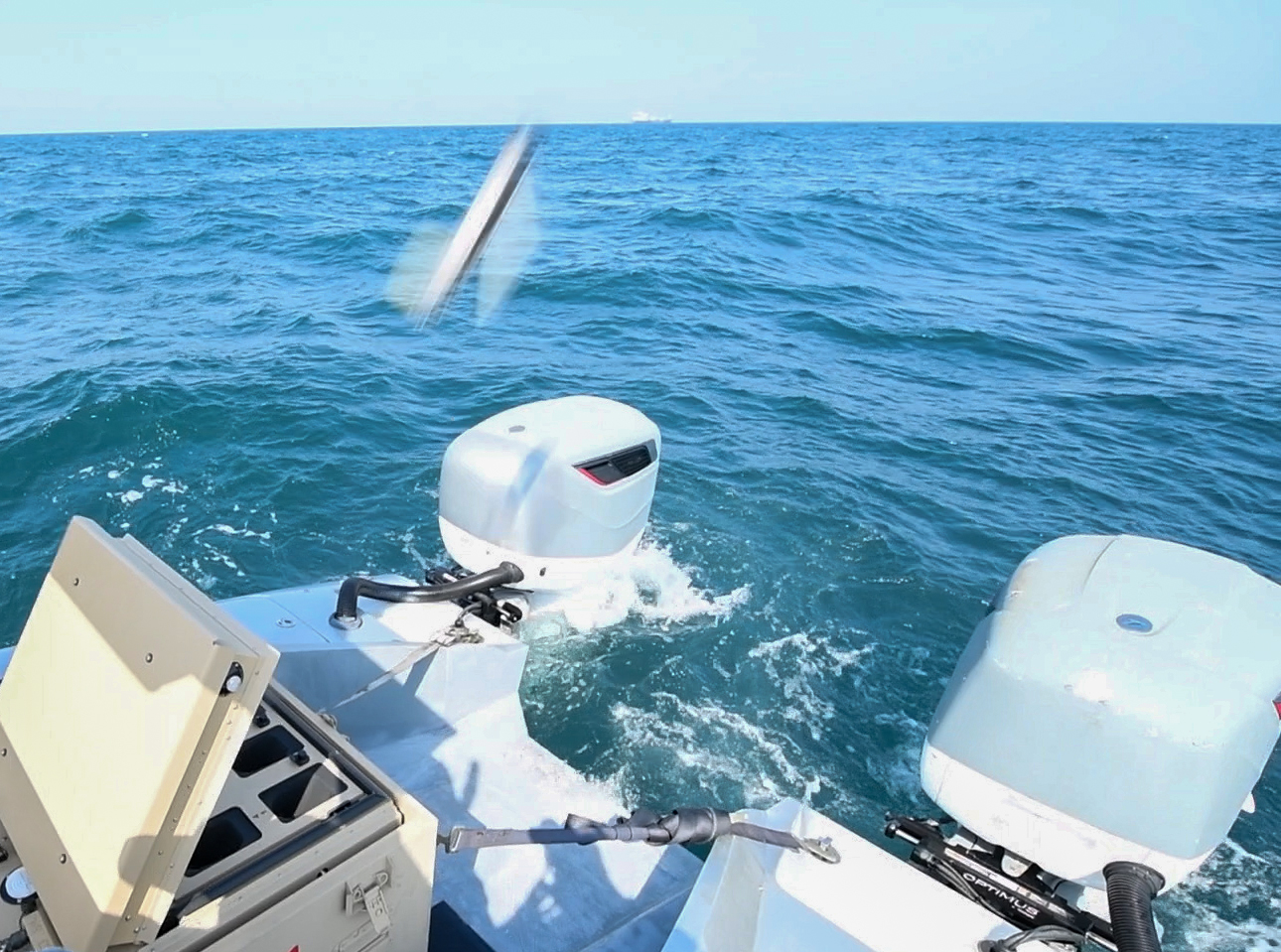
Lethal Miniature Aerial Missile System launches munitions from a T-38 Devil Ray Unmanned Surface Vehicle.

The Lethal Miniature Aerial Missile System (LMAMS) is a small, man-portable loitering munition developed for the U.S. Army. It is intended to combat non-line-of-sight targets such as snipers and enemy combatants planting IEDs. It can also attack targets that infantry cannot see, such as unmanned aerial vehicles (UAV). It is a single-use weapon meant to be carried in a soldier's backpack.

Six critical government-owned components have been tested by the U.S. Army Aviation and Missile Research, Development and Engineering Center (ARMDEC). A small electronic safety and arming device, secure micro digital data link, power, laser ranging height for the burst sensor and image stabilization/auto-tracker function have been developed and tested. It deploys in two minutes and has a loiter time of fifteen minutes, transmitting color imagery back to a ground station.

== See also ==
List of Missiles by Country
