= Padasuri-6 =

North Korean submarine-launched cruise missile

- Type: Anti-ship cruise missile
- Place of origin: North Korea

Service history
- In service: 2024–present
- Used by: Korean People's Navy

Production history
- Designed: 2020
- Manufacturer: North Korea

Specifications
- Mass: 650 kg (1,430 lb)
- Warhead: 150 kg (330 lb)
- Operational range: 200–400 km (120–250 mi)
- Maximum speed: Mach 0.8 (980 km/h)
- Launch platform: Tracked TEL

The Padasuri-6 (Korean: 《바다수리-6》형; lit. 'Sea Eagle Type 6') is a North Korean anti-ship cruise missile.

== Description ==
Padasuri-6 is a further development of Kumsong-3, a copy from the Soviet Union's Kh-35.

The missile uses a solid-fueled booster. It also uses a infrared terminal seeker and an active radar homing warhead. The body and payload mass are estimated to be 650 kg (1,430 lb) and 150 kg (330 lb) respectively. Padasuri-6 can achieve a maximum speed of Mach 0.8 (980 km/h).

Padasuri-6's range is alleged to be around 200–400 km (120–250 mi). According to observers, it is likely that during the modernization process, the Padasuri-6 has a longer range, a better guidance system or a more powerful warhead than the Russian missile. It is also possible that Padasuri-6 used components from United States and Europe to achieve this.

Each tracked transporter erector launcher (TEL) has eight launch tubes, for eight Padasuri-6 missiles.

== History ==
Padasuri-6 appeared during a military parade on 10 October 2020; however, it was unnamed. Images showed tracked TELs with eight launch tubes.

North Korea first test-fired this system on 14 February 2024 and revealed its official name as Padasuri-6. After the test, it was revealed that Padasuri-6 previously appeared during other military parades beside the 2020 parade.

== List of tests ==
Attempt	Date	Location	Outcome	Additional notes	References
1	14 February 2024	Wonsan	Success	The missiles flew for over 1,400 seconds before hitting the target. Kim Jong Un oversaw the test.	

== In popular culture ==
After the first successful test, on 27 July 2024, the Korea Stamp Corporation unveiled postage stamps featuring Padasuri-6.

== See also ==
- Kumsong-3
- Kh-35
- P-15 Termit
