= Ya Ali (phrase) =

Arabic phrase used by individuals of Shi'ism

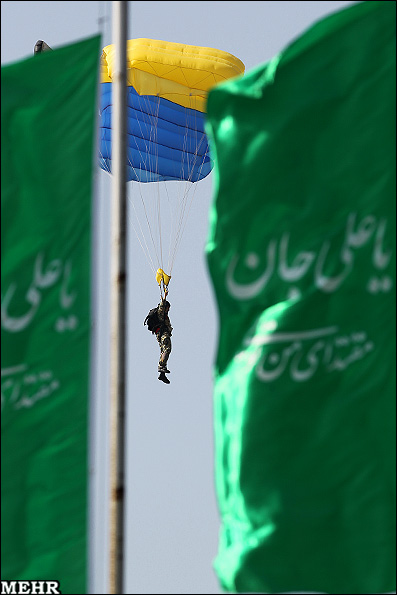
Iranian flags saying "یا علی جان" (Islamic Republic of Iran Army Day, 2012)

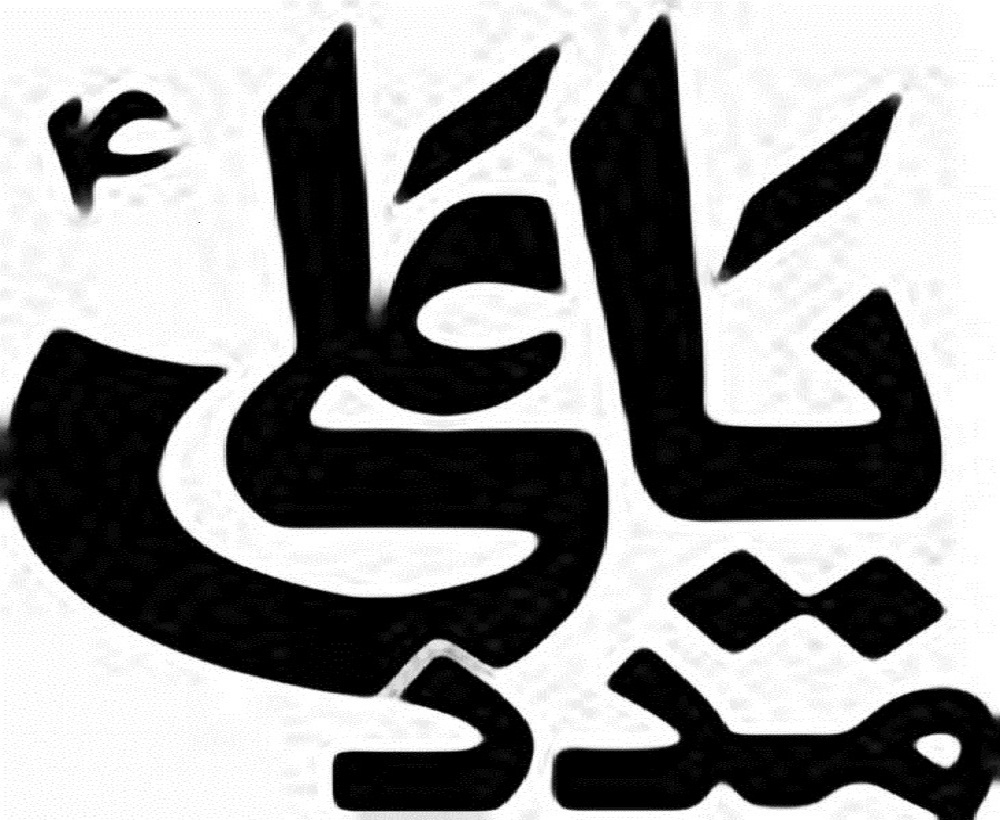
Calligraphy saying يا علي مدد (Yā ʿAlī Madad, meaning Ya Ali, help)

Ya Ali (Arabic: يَا عَلِيّ, romanized: Yā ʿAlī) is an Arabic phrase used by Shia Muslims to invoke the memory or intervention of Ali ibn Abi Talib. It is especially used in the context of the mourning of Muharram.

== Use ==
It is used to seek intercession through Ali (which some Sunni Muslims would call blasphemy) the 1st Shia imam and 4th Sunni caliph, with most practitioners being Shia Muslims. However, it is not, as many believe, calling upon Ali, which would make it shirk by Sharia. Whether phrases like Ya Ali, and similar ones like Ya Muhammad or Ya Husayn (tawassul), are shirk is a debated topic amongst Islamic scholars.

=== Mourning of Muharram ===
During the mourning of Muharram, it is very common for Shia Muslims to say Ya Ali. On such occasions, the slogans demonstrate support.

=== Other ===
The phrase is often used on various flags, especially on official flags of Iran, and also the name giver for the Iranian missile Ya-Ali and the Shia militant group Ya Ali Popular Formations.

== See also ==
- Ya Husayn
- Ya Muhammad
- Day of Ashura
- Mourning of Muharram
- Tawassul
