= 2019 Abha International Airport attacks =

2019 missile strikes carried out by the Houthi movement

- Part of the Yemeni Civil War (2014–present) and the Iran–Saudi Arabia proxy conflict
- Location: Saudi Arabia
- Target: Abha International Airport
- Date: June 2019
- Executed by: Houthi movement
- Casualties: 1 civilian killed 47 civilians injured
- Location within Saudi Arabia

In June 2019, Yemeni Houthi rebels carried out a series of cruise missile strikes targetting the arrivals hall of Abha International Airport in southwestern Saudi Arabia, killing one civilian and injuring 47 others.

The Saudi-led coalition stated that an Iranian made Ya Ali cruise missile had been used in the attack, but Jane's Defence Weekly later reported that a Yemeni made Quds cruise missile may have been used because of its similarity to the fins recovered from the debris.

The first attack occurred on 19 June and wounded 26.

The second attack, a drone strike, occurred on June 23, killing a Syrian national and wounding 21 and yet another two days later on June 25.

== Casualties ==
According to the Saudi-led Arab coalition spokesman Colonel Turki Al-Maliki, 26 people from different nationalities were injured from the first attack. Eighteen people were treated for minor injuries while eight people were transferred to a hospital.

== Retaliation ==
Days after the first attack, Royal Saudi Air Force conducted multiple air strikes on Houthi forces in Yemen's capital Sana'a in response to the airport attack. According to Saudi state media, the strikes hit air-defence systems and other military positions in the Houthi-controlled city.

== Reactions ==
- Bahrain's Foreign Minister strongly condemned the attack, describing it as a "dangerous escalation through Iranian weapons."
- Kuwait condemned the attack saying that it was a "criminal attack" on innocent people.
- France condemned the attack, which targeted Abha Airport in southwestern Saudi Arabia. Describing that its expresses their solidarity with Saudi Arabia in the face of these attacks on the security of its territory and its people.
- Malaysia strongly condemned the missile attack on the Abha International Airport. The Ministry of Foreign Affairs said in a statement that the attack is an unacceptable violation of international law and detrimental to the peace and security of the Middle East.
- Mauritania expressed its condemnation in the strongest terms of the attack on Abha International Airport, which injured a number of innocent civilians.
- Pakistan strongly condemned the missile attack by Houthi militants at Abha airport in Saudi Arabia that resulted in 26 Injuries. Pakistan reiterated its full support and solidarity with the brotherly Kingdom of Saudi Arabia against any threats to its security and territorial integrity.
- The United Arab Emirates condemned the attack, stating that this attack was proof of the Houthi militia's attempts to "undermine regional security."
- Egypt condemned the attack stating that "Egypt stands by the government and people of Saudi Arabia in the face of any attempt targeting its security and stability."

Human Rights Watch condemned that attack, stating "unlawful Saudi-led coalition air strikes in Yemen never justify Houthi attacks on Saudi civilians". HRW described the attack as a 'war crime' urging the Houthis to stop attacks on civilian infrastructure in Saudi Arabia.
