= Ya Husayn =

Shia phrase

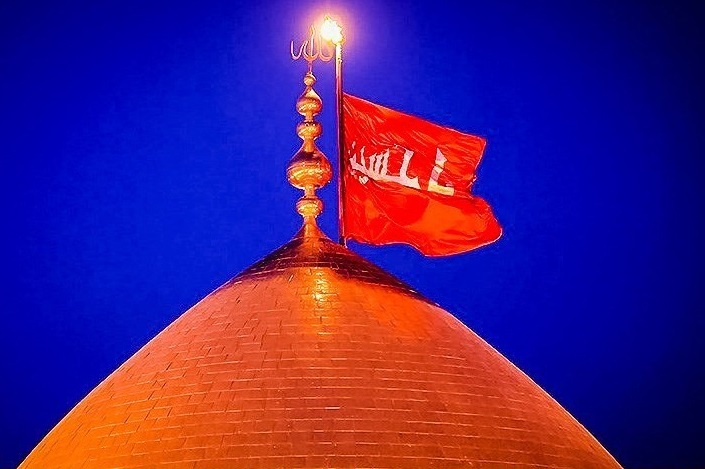
"Ya Husayn" flag flown from Imam Husayn Shrine during Ashura.

Ya Husayn (Arabic: يَا حُسَيْن, romanized: Yā Ḥusayn) is an Arabic phrase used by Shia Muslims to invoke the memory or intervention of Husayn ibn Ali. It is especially used in the context of the Mourning of Muharram. It is commonly found on flags. Husayn is assigned a high status in Shiism and is considered the third imam.

== Flag ==
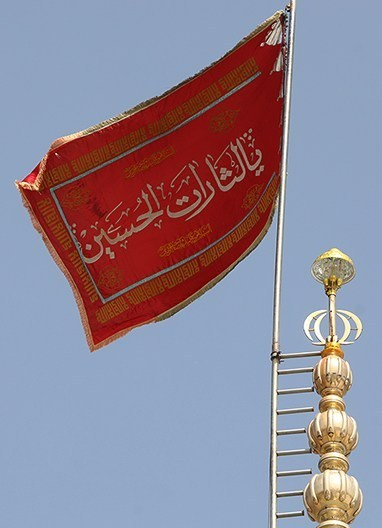
A flag inscribed "O ye avengers of Husayn" over the Jamkaran Mosque after the 2025 Israeli strikes on Iran

Husayn is invoked on red Shia flags in modern Iran, particularly in the form ya la-thara al-Husayn ("O ye avengers of Husayn"). According to a Shia legend, the troops of Husayn fought under a red banner. The association of red color with Husayn symbolizes the blood of martyrs and was further entrenched in some hadiths. For example, Al-Mojamul Kabir and Majma al-Zawa'id allege that at the time of Husayn's martyrdom the sky became deep red, and for several days it seemed that it was smeared with blood. According to certain Iranian Shia traditions, ya la-thara al-Husayn should be a rallying cry for believers upon the return of the Hidden Imam.

The red flag was raised particularly on the Jamkaran Mosque after the assassination of Qasem Soleimani "to avenge [his] blood", according to Yassine Hossein Abadi, the Jamkaran Mosque administrator. It was also raised for the revenge purpose on the same mosque during the 2025 Israeli strikes on Iran and after the death of Ali Khamenei during the 2026 Israeli–United States strikes on Iran.

== See also ==
- Descendants of Ali ibn Abi Talib
- Day of Ashura
- Day of Tasu'a
- Tawassul
- Mourning of Muharram
- Sermon of Ali ibn Husayn in Damascus
- Ya Muhammad
- Ziyarat Ashura
- Ya Ali (phrase)
