= Paveh cruise missile =

Paveh Missile
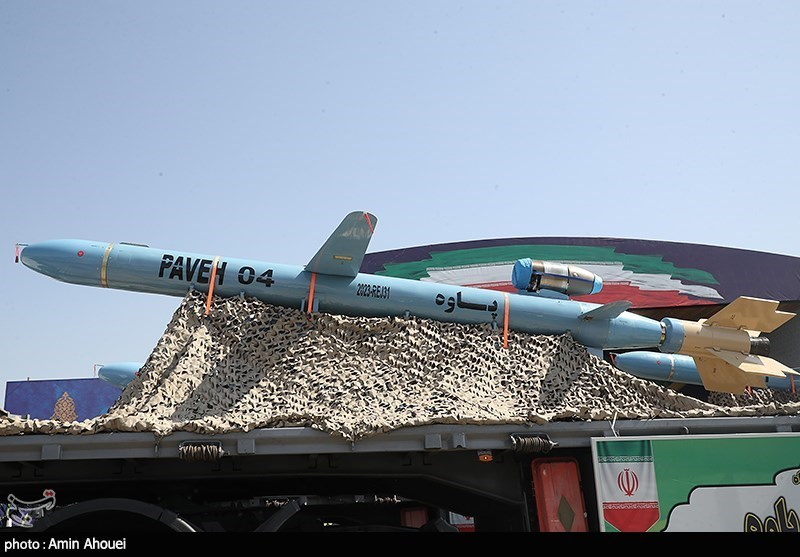
- Type: Strategic cruise missile

Service history
- In service: 2023 (Unveiled)
- Used by: Iran; Islamic Resistance in Iraq; Houthi movement Hezbollah
- Wars: Gaza war

Production history
- Manufacturer: Iran (Islamic Republic of Iran Navy)

Specifications
- Length: Not Mentioned
- Warhead: 100kg
- Engine: Turbo-jet engine
- Operational range: 1650 Km
- Maximum speed: 900 km/h, Mach 0.72
- Guidance system: A smart missile that can change targets mid-mission

The Paveh (Persian:پاوه) is an Iranian long-range surface-to-surface cruise missile with a range of 1,650 km (1,030 mi).

== Development ==
Paveh is a part of the Soumar cruise missile family, which was unveiled in 2015 with the first missile of the family being the Soumar which had a range of 700 km.

On 2 February 2019, Iran unveiled the Hoveyzah Cruise Missile, a surface-to-surface missile with a claimed range of more than 1,350 kilometers.

Paveh was unveiled and displayed to the public on 2 February 2023.

== Design ==
The missile has a range of 1,650 km (1,030 mi).it is capable of speeds of 900 kilometers per hour, at very low altitudes (even up to 5 meters above ground level).

Paveh uses retractable wings on its body, and the engine of this cruise missile is also outside the body and is located on its upper part.

Paveh has the ability to take different paths to reach the goal. That is, before reaching the target, it circulates to the required extent and attacks the target from another direction.

Another capability of "Paveh" cruise missiles is the ability of these missiles to attack in mass and communicate with each other during the attack. In this method, one of the missiles acts as the leader of the attacking missile group and guides the other missiles. If necessary, one or more of the targeted missiles are sent forward by the platoon leader and are actually baited to open the way for other missiles to be accurately hit.

The media of the Islamic Republic have announced that the new missiles have a range sufficient to reach Israel.

== Operational history ==
Paveh in the middle at an aerospace exhibition

On 9 April 2024, the Islamic Resistance in Iraq (IRI) claimed responsibility for a cruise missile attack on Ashkelon oil terminal and Hatzerim Air Base in Israel. In their released footage of the missile launches, the US Defense Intelligence Agency stated al-Arqabs are Paveh-type cruise missiles that the Houthis in Yemen call the Quds. Iran Watch also asserts that the Quds-1 is the Houthi name for the Paveh cruise missile, and that the missiles are visually identical.

On 13 April 2024, Iran launched a significant number of Paveh cruise missiles against Israel; Iran Watch estimated that about 36 were used.

Lebanese Hezbollah used a Paveh cruise missile on 24 March 2026 targeting the town of Misgav Am in northern Israel. Hezbollah fired a second missile on 14 April 2026, targeting northern Israel.
