= LORA (missile) =

Israeli theater quasi-ballistic missile

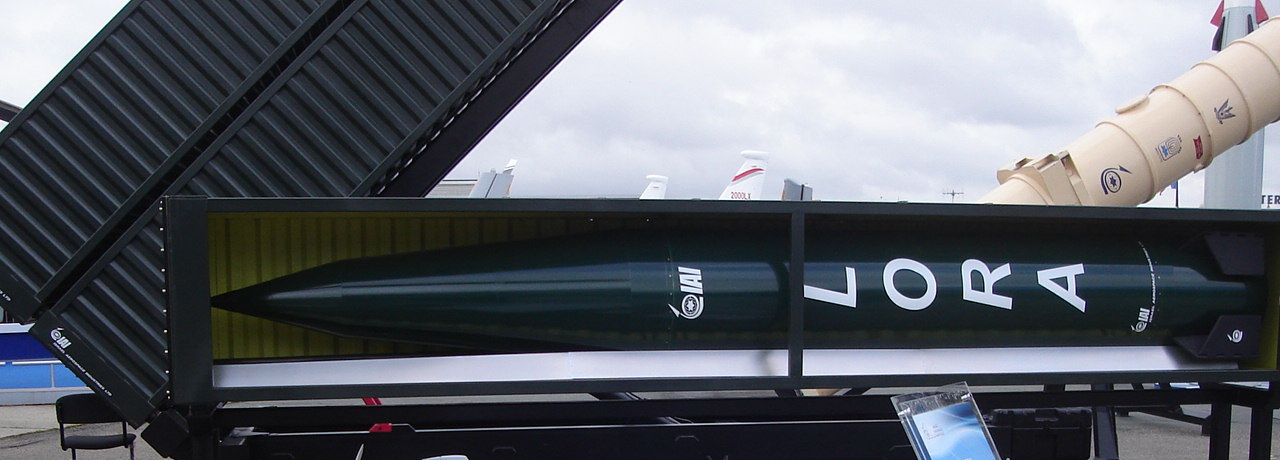
- LORA missile in launcher
- Type: Theater quasiballistic missile; air-launched ballistic missile

Service history
- Used by: Azerbaijani Land Forces; Indian Armed Forces
- Wars: 2020 Nagorno-Karabakh conflict

Production history
- Manufacturer: Israel Aerospace Industries

Specifications
- Mass: 1.6 tons (1,600 kg)
- Length: 5.2 meters
- Diameter: 624 mm
- Warhead: 570 kg high explosive, bomblets or high speed penetrator warhead
- Operational range: 90 - 430 km
- Maximum speed: up to Mach 5
- Guidance system: inertial navigation, GPS and TV terminal
- Accuracy: 10m CEP

LORA (LOng Range Artillery) is a theater quasi-ballistic missile developed by Israel Aerospace Industries (IAI).

== Development ==
LORA began development in 2002. The missile has a range of 400 kilometres (250 mi) and a CEP of 10 metres (33 ft) when using a combination of GPS and TV for terminal guidance. It can be ship-launched from inside of a standard Intermodal container. An air-launched variant called Air LORA was unveiled in June 2024.

== Operational history ==
On 11 June 2018, Azerbaijan revealed it had purchased the LORA system from Israel at an undisclosed date following president Ilham Aliyev's visit to an Azerbaijani Land Forces missile unit housing both the LORA and the Polonez. LORA was used in the final days of the 2020 Nagorno-Karabakh war, being used to target a vital bridge in the Lachin corridor linking Armenia to the Nagorno-Karabakh region. It was initially thought to have destroyed the bridge, but later evidence suggested it had only inflicted limited damage.

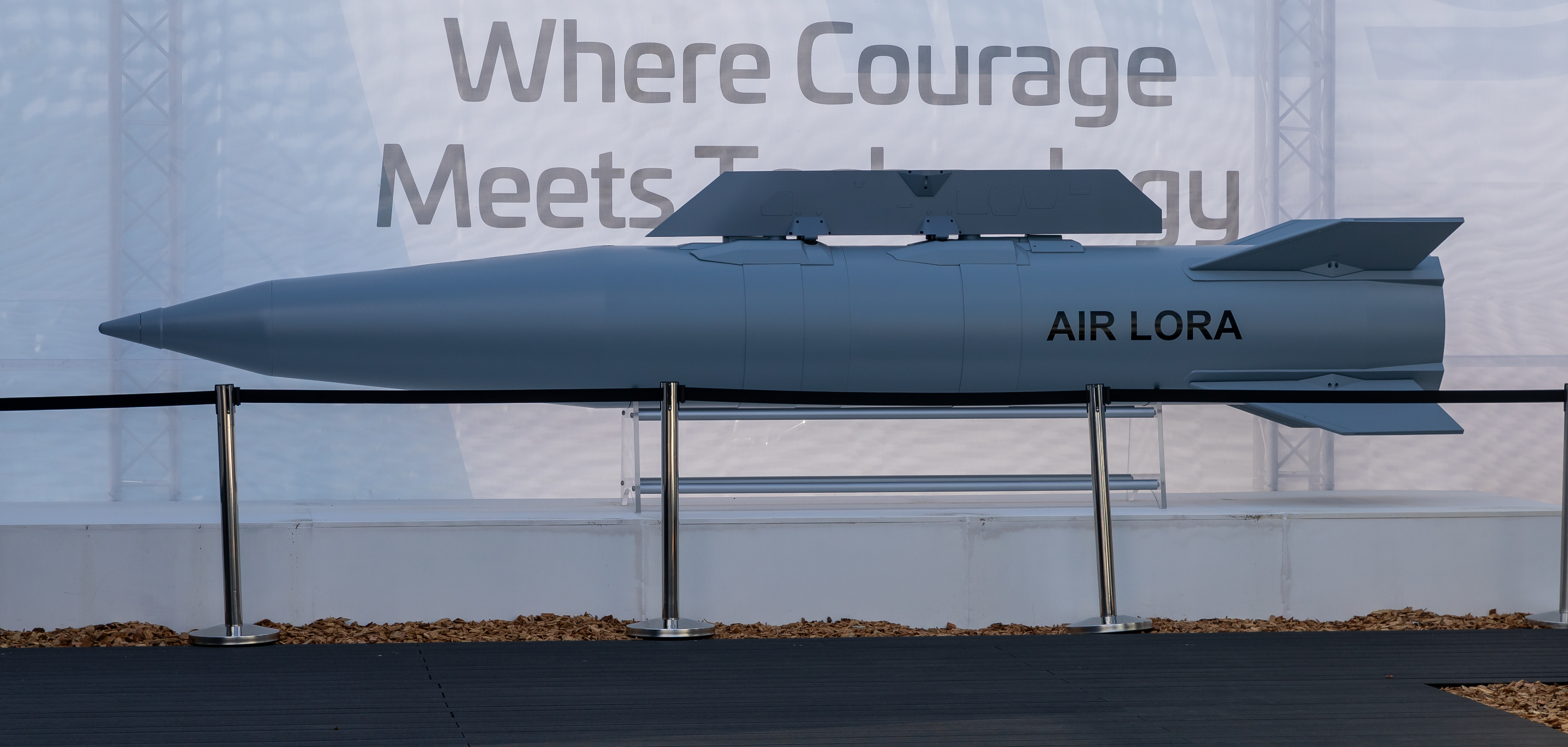
AIR LORA air-launched ballistic missile

During Aero India in June 2023, India's Bharat Electronics signed a memorandum of understanding with IAI to produce the LORA in India under license.

In December 2025, Greece decided to purchase the LORA system from IAI, being deployed by both the Hellenic Airforce and Army. As of that time, first deliveries were expected by early 2026.

In September 2026, the German Navy tested the container-based version of the system from a frigate in the North Atlantic, as the Bundeswehr aims to expand its deep-strike capabilities.

== Operators ==
=== Current operators ===
- Israel
- India
- Azerbaijan

=== Future operators ===
- Greece

=== Potential operators ===
- Germany
