= List of active missiles of the United States military =

The following is a list of active missiles of the United States military.

== Air-to-air missiles ==
Missile	Guidance	Speed	Image
Air-to-Air Stinger	Infrared homing	Mach 2.2	
AIM-7 Sparrow	Semi-active radar homing	Mach 4	
AIM-9 Sidewinder	Infrared homing	Unverified (≈Mach 2.7)	
AIM-120 AMRAAM	Active radar homing	Mach 4	
AIM-174B Gunslinger	Active radar homing and semi-active radar homing	Mach 3.5	

== Air-to-surface missiles ==
Missile	Guidance	Speed	Image
AGM-65 Maverick	Infrared homing (AGM-65D/G/F); Semi-active laser homing (AGM-65E); Charge-coupled device (AGM-65H/K)	Mach 0.93	
AGM-88 HARM	Radiation homing	Mach 2.9	
AGM-158 JASSM	Global Positioning System	Subsonic	
AGM-84 Harpoon	Active radar homing	Mach 0.72	
AGM-114 Hellfire	Semi-active laser homing (AGM-114K/M/N/P/R); Active radar homing (AGM-114L)	Mach 1.3	
AGM-86 ALCM	Global Positioning System	Subsonic	
AGM-158C LRASM	Global Positioning System	Mach 0.9	

== Surface-to-air ==
Missile	Guidance	Speed	Image
RIM-7 Sea Sparrow	Semi-active radar homing	Mach 4	
RIM-66 Standard	Command midcourse and Terminal Semi-active radar homing	Mach 3.5	
FIM-92 Stinger	Infrared homing	Mach 2.54	
MIM-104 Patriot	Command midcourse and Terminal Semi-active radar homing	Mach 5	
RIM-116 Rolling Airframe Missile	Infrared homing	Mach 2.5	
RIM-156A Standard	Command midcourse and Terminal Semi-active radar homing	Unverified (classified)	
RIM-161 Standard Missile 3	GPS/INS/semi-active radar homing/passive LWIR infrared homing seeker (KW)	Unverified (≈Mach 9+)	
RIM-162 Evolved Sea Sparrow	Command midcourse and Terminal Semi-active radar homing	Mach 4	
RIM-174 Standard ERAM	Command midcourse and Terminal Active radar homing	Unverified (≈Mach 3.5)	
NASAMS (Used to protect high-value targets and Washington, D.C.)	Active radar homing	Mach 4	

== Surface-to-surface missiles ==
Missile	Guidance	Speed	Image
FGM-148 Javelin	Infrared homing	Mach 0.32	
BGM-71 TOW	Wire-guided	Mach 0.8	
BGM-109 Tomahawk	Global Positioning System aided TERCOM	Mach 0.7	
RGM-84 Harpoon	Active radar homing	Mach 0.7	
MGM-140 ATACMS	GPS-aided inertial navigation guidance	Mach 3	
LRHW	-	Mach 7	

== Antisubmarine warfare ==
Missile	Guidance	Speed	Image
RUM-139 VL-ASROC	Inertial navigation system	Subsonic	

== ICBM ==
Missile	Guidance	Speed	Image
LGM-30 Minuteman	Inertial navigation system GPS	≈Mach 23	

== Submarine-launched ==
Missile	Guidance	Speed
UGM-133 Trident II	Global Positioning System	Mach 24
UGM-109 Tomahawk	Global Positioning System	Mach 0.7
UGM-84 Harpoon	Active radar homing	Mach 0.7

== See also ==
- Lists of weapons
- List of missiles
- List of missiles by country
