= Ya Muhammad =

Muslim expression

Ya Muhammad (Arabic: يَا مُحَمَّد, romanized: Yā Muḥammad) is an Arabic expression invoking Muhammad.

== Definition ==
The phrase means "O Muhammad". The word yā indicates the vocative case, signifying direct address to a person. It is a common prefix used by Arabic speakers before personal names.

== Use ==
It is used to seek intercession through the prophet or his family, companions and venerated figures. The majority of its practitioners are the Shias and Sunnis including the Sufis. The vocative yā when used with Allāh is used to call upon God for help.

=== Mourning of Muharram ===
During the mourning of Muharram, spontaneous slogans of Ya Husayn, Ya Ali, and Ya Rasul Allah (Arabic: يَا رَسُولُ الله "O Messenger of God") are common by Shias. On such occasions, the slogans demonstrate support.
