= Ya Ali Gavabar =

Ya Ali Gavabar ياعلي گوابر
- Village
- Location within Iran
- Coordinates: 37°03′50″N 50°09′50″E
- Country: Iran
- Province: Gilan
- County: Amlash
- Bakhsh: Central
- Rural District: Amlash-e Jonubi

Population (2006)
  - Total: 297
- Time zone: UTC+3:30 (IRST)
  - Summer (DST): UTC+4:30 (IRDT)

Ya Ali Gavabar (Persian: ياعلي گوابر, also Romanized as Yā ʿAlī Gavābar; also known as Aligavaber) is a village in Amlash-e Jonubi Rural District, in the Central District of Amlash County, Gilan Province, Iran. At the 2006 census, its population was 297, in 74 families.
