= Kh-55 =

Family of Soviet air-launched cruise missiles

Kh-55/65/555 AS-15 Kent
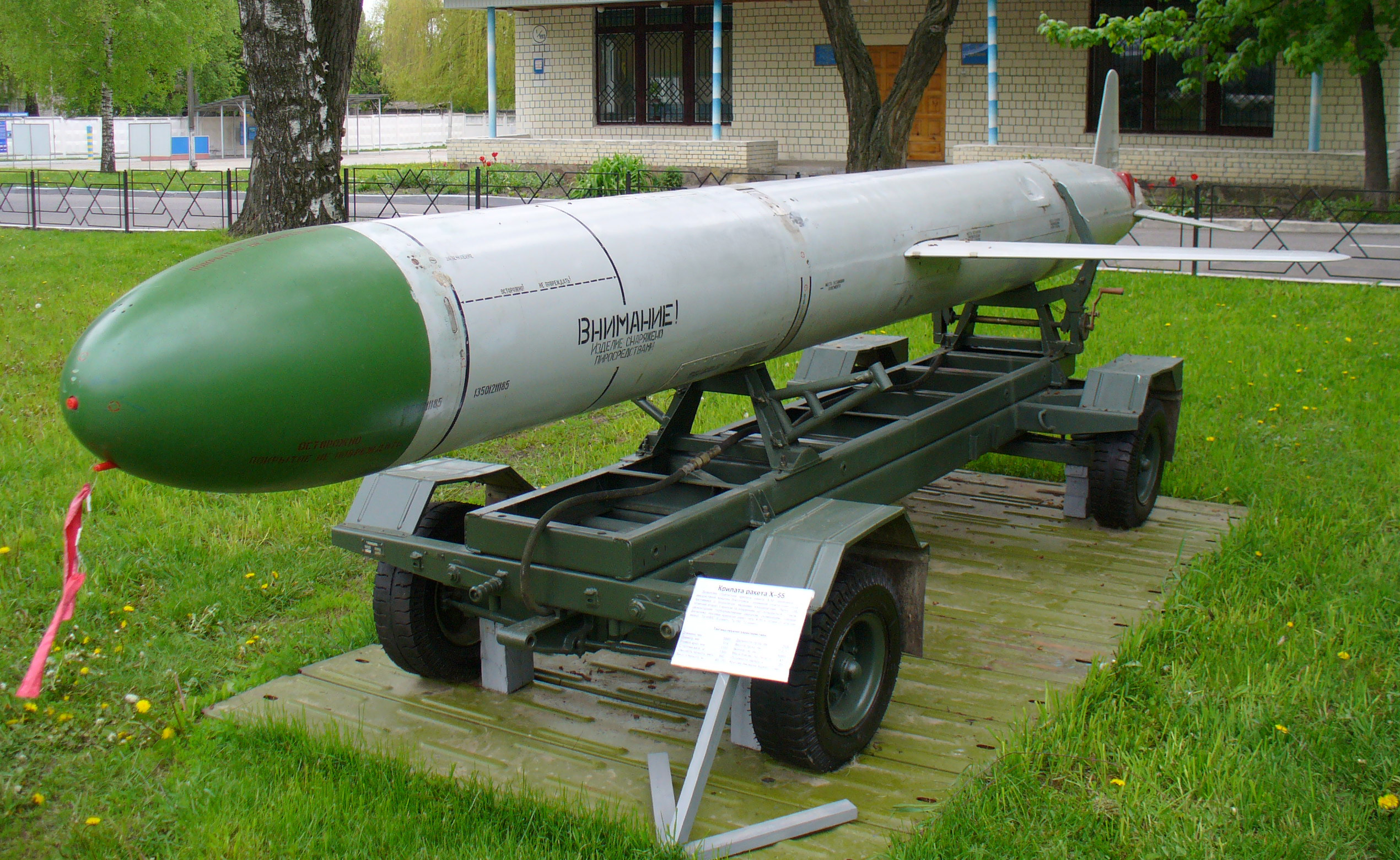
- Kh-55 in the Ukrainian Air Force Museum
- Type: Air-launched cruise missile
- Place of origin: Soviet Union

Service history
- In service: 1983–present
- Used by: Soviet Union, Russia, China, Iran
- Wars: Syrian Civil War; Russo-Ukrainian war

Production history
- Designed: 1971–1981
- Manufacturer: Raduga OKB, KhAZ (Kharkiv), Novator (MZiK) & NPP Temp (Eka) NPO Strela (Oren), else
- Produced: 1981

Specifications
- Mass: 1,650 kg (3,640 lb) (Kh-65SE); 2,400 kg (5,300 lb) (Kh-101)
- Length: 604 cm (19 ft 10 in) (Kh-65SE); 745 cm (24 ft 5 in) (Kh-101)
- Diameter: 51.4 cm (20.2 in) (Kh-55/Kh-55SM)
- Wingspan: 310 cm (122.0 in) (Kh-55/Kh-55SM)
- Warhead: Thermonuclear weapon or Conventional warhead
- Blast yield: 200kt Nuclear (Kh-55/Kh-55SM)
- Engine: R95TP-300 Turbofan/turbofan (Kh-55/Kh-55SM); 360-400 kgf (Kh-55/Kh-55SM)
- Propellant: jet fuel
- Operational range: 2,500 km (1,300 nmi) (Kh-55); 3,000 km (1,600 nmi) (Kh-55SM); 600 km (320 nmi) (Kh-65SE); 300 km, later 600 km (Kh-SD)
- Flight altitude: under 110 m/300 ft
- Maximum speed: Mach 0.75 (KH-SD); Mach 0.6-0.78 (Kh-101)
- Guidance system: inertial guidance with Doppler radar/terrain map updates; Kh-SD had a TC/IIR terminal guidance system, and an alternative active radar homing seeker was proposed
- Launch platform: Tu-95MS, Tu-160, Su-34

The Kh-55 (Russian: Х-55 (Note: The cyrillic letter "Kha" is in English transcribed as either Kh or X, so Kh series missiles may appear in some texts as X-55, X-65, X-101 and so on.), also known as RKV-500; NATO reporting name: AS-15 "Kent") is a Soviet/Russian subsonic air-launched cruise missile, designed by MKB Raduga in the 1970s. It has a range of up to 2,500 km (1,350 nmi) and can carry nuclear warheads. Kh-55 is launched exclusively from bomber aircraft and has spawned a number of conventionally armed variants mainly for tactical use, such as the Kh-65SE and Kh-SD, but only the Kh-555 appears to have been put into service.

== Development ==
In the late 1960s, the "Ekho" study conducted by the GosNIIAS institute concluded that it would be more effective to deploy many small, subsonic cruise missiles than the much more expensive supersonic missiles then in favour. Work started at the Raduga bureau on an air-launched cruise missile in 1971, with a first test flight in 1976. The appearance of the US Air Force's AGM-86 ALCM in that year gave further impetus to the programme, with the Soviet Air Force issuing a formal requirement for a new air-launched cruise missile in December 1976. The longer-range Kh-55SM was developed a few years after the original went into service.

After the end of the Cold War and anti-proliferation treaties restricting the deployment of long-range nuclear missiles, the Russians made efforts to develop tactical versions of the Kh-55 with conventional warheads. First came the 600 km-range Kh-65SE (derived from the Kh-55) announced in 1992, then the 300 km-range Kh-SD tactical version of the Kh-101 for export, and finally the Kh-555. In 2001 the Russian Air Force are believed to have selected the Kh-101 and Kh-555 for development.

A 1995 Russian document suggested that a complete production facility had been transferred to Shanghai, for the development of a nuclear-armed cruise missile. Originally it was thought that this was based on the 300 km-range Raduga Kh-15 (AS-16 "Kickback"), but it appears that it was the Kh-55 that was transferred to China.

== Design ==
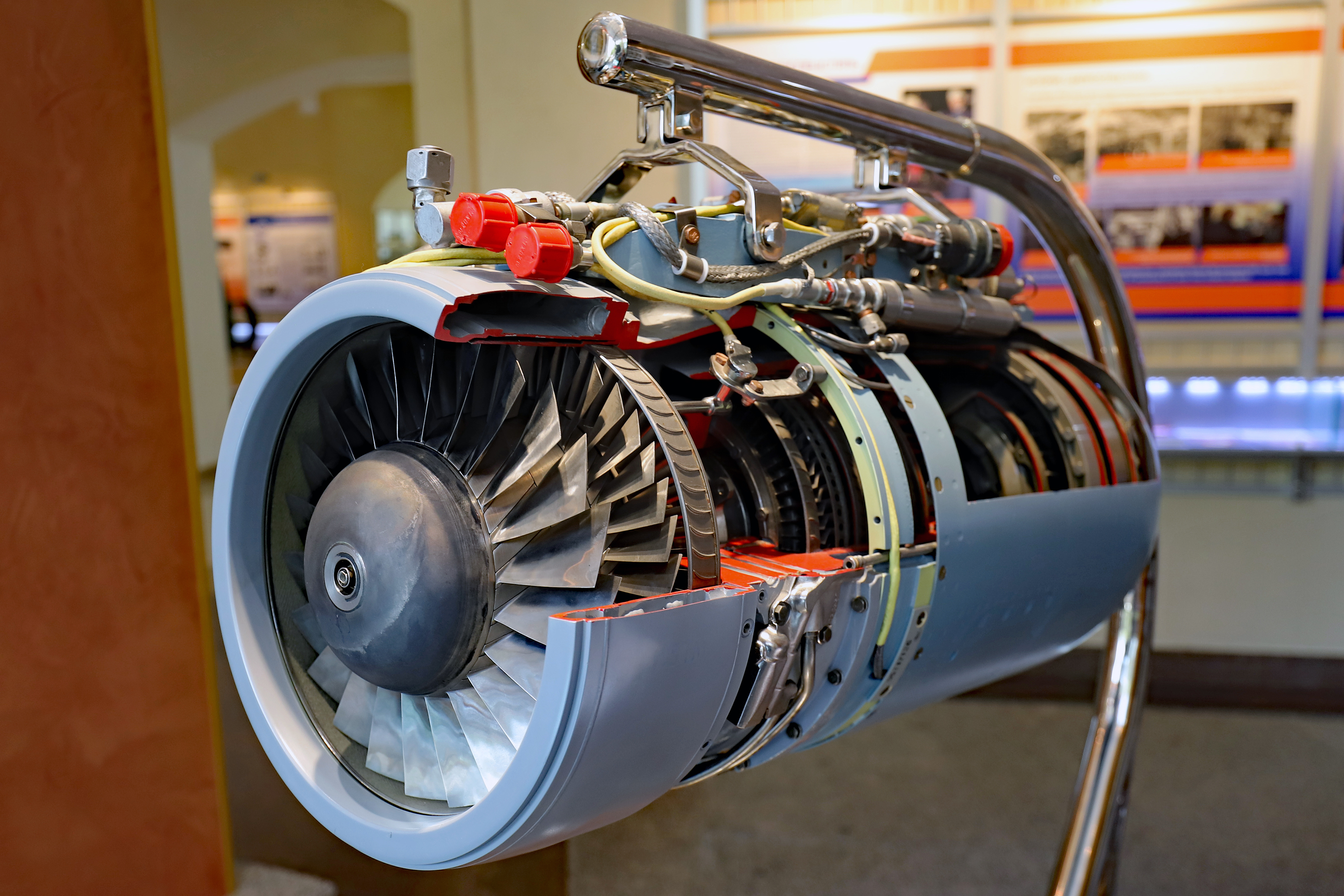
R-95-300 turbofan

The original Kh-55 was powered by a drop-down, now-Ukrainian-made 400 kgf Motor Sich JSC R95-300 turbofan engine, with pop-out wings for cruising efficiency. The Kh-65SE version had a fixed external turbojet engine, while the Kh-SD had its engine inside the body of the missile. Production versions in 2013 were equipped with the increased-power 450 kgf Russian-made NPO Saturn TRDD-50A engine.

The missile can be launched from both high and low altitudes, and flies at subsonic speeds at low levels (under 110 m/300 ft altitude). After launch, the missile's folded wings, tail surfaces and engine deploy. It is guided through a combination of an inertial guidance system plus a terrain contour-matching guidance system which uses radar and images stored in the memory of an onboard computer to find its target. This allows the missile to guide itself to the target with a high degree of accuracy.

In the nuclear role, Kh-55 carries a 200 kilotonnes of TNT (840 TJ) warhead designated TK66, with a warhead weight of 130 kilograms (290 lb). The mass-size simulator for the warhead is designated KTS-120-12.

== Operational history ==
The original Kh-55 entered service on 31 December 1983. The Kh-55SM followed in 1987. The conventionally armed Kh-55SE was flight tested on 13 January 2000, and first used in exercises over the Black Sea 17–22 April 2000. The Kh-555 is thought to have entered service in 2004.

The Kh-55 can be carried by the Tu-95MS (NATO "Bear-H") and Tu-142M (NATO "Bear-F"), and the Kh-55SM is carried by the Tupolev Tu-160 "White Swan" (NATO "Blackjack"). Sixteen Kh-55s can be carried by the Tu-95MS16 variant, ten on underwing hardpoints and six on an MKU-5-6 rotary launcher. The missile was also tested on the Tu-22M (NATO "Backfire") bombers.

The end of the Cold War left Ukraine with 1,612 Kh-55s, part of the armament of the 19 Tu-160s of the 184th Heavy Bomber Regiment at Pryluky and the 25 Tu-95MSs of the 182nd Heavy Bomber Regiment at Uzin-Shepelovka. It was reported that Ukraine demanded US$3 billion for the return of the planes and their missiles to Russia. In October 1999, a compromise was reached that saw Russia pay US$285 million for eight Tu-160 and three Tu-95MS bombers and 575 Kh-55 cruise missiles, while the rest were meant to be destroyed under U.S.-led Nunn–Lugar Cooperative Threat Reduction programme. However, in March 2005 Ukraine's prosecutor-general Sviatoslav Piskun said that in 2001, twelve Kh-55s had been exported to Iran in a deal said to be worth US$49.5 million, and an additional six Kh-55s were exported to China. In March 2015, Iran subsequently revealed the existence of the Soumar cruise missile.

=== Syrian Civil War ===
In the course of the Russian military intervention in the Syrian Civil War on 17 November 2015, Russian Defence Ministry reported that Tupolev Tu-95MS and Tupolev Tu-160 strategic bombers launched a total of 34 air-launched cruise missiles against 14 ISIL targets in Syria. While the Tu-95MS used the Kh-55 cruise missiles, the Tu-160 were equipped with the stealthy Kh-101 variant in their first combat use.

Video showing Russian Tu-95MS launching Kh-101 cruise missiles in September 2017 at targets in northern Syria.

Russian news agency TASS reported on 17 November 2016 that modernized Tu-95MS armed with Kh-555 and Kh-101 air-launched cruise missiles had launched airstrikes against targets described as terrorist in Syria.

=== 2022 invasion of Ukraine ===
The UK Ministry of Defence said in November 2022 that it appeared that Russian forces, due to very much depleted weapons stores, were firing old AS-15 Kent cruise missiles with the nuclear warheads apparently replaced by inert ballast, hoping merely to distract Ukrainian air defenses. However the missiles can still pose a serious risk due to their kinetic energy and any unspent fuel left in the missile that might explode.

Ukrainian Kh-55 nuclear missiles that had been transferred to Russia as part of a weapons-for-gas trade in 1999 were found to have been fired at Ukraine after Russian forces replaced their warheads with ballast, as dummy missiles used to overwhelm Ukrainian air defences.

At least several civilians are known to have suffered as the result of such attacks. One Kh-55 hit an apartment building in the capital of Ukraine at the end of 2022, killing a woman. Another hit a house in Kyiv Oblast, injuring a child.

A Kh-55 missile with a ballast warhead, launched over Belarus on 16 December 2022, diverted course and fell in Poland, in a forest in Zamość, Kuyavian-Pomeranian Voivodeship 15 km west of Bydgoszcz after having crossed around 500 km of Polish territory. According to Polish PM Mateusz Morawiecki, it was detected by Polish and allied radars, however the missile was accidentally found only on 22 April 2023 and the incident was revealed a couple of days later. It is not clear, if its fall in Poland, near aviation repair works in Bydgoszcz, engaged in military aid for Ukraine, was caused by a technical failure of an old missile, or was a provocation.

== Variants ==
- Kh-55 (NATO "Kent-A", RKV-500A, Izdeliye 120) - original model with 2,500 km range.
- Kh-55-OK - with optical guidance.
- Kh-55SM (NATO "Kent-B", RKV-500B, Izdeliye 121) - with extra fuel tanks to extend range to 3000 km.
- Kh-65SE - tactical version announced in 1992 with 410 kg conventional warhead and restricted to the 600 km range limit (expired on 2.8.2019) of the INF treaty.
- Kh-55/65SD (средней дальности Srednei Dalnosti - "Medium Range") - 300 km range conventional version announced in 1995, possibly for export. Shared components with the Kh-101, range reportedly increased to 600 km with a high-altitude approach, but the Kh-SD was apparently shelved in 2001. An alternative active radar seeker was proposed for anti-shipping use.
- Kh-555 (NATO AS-22 "Kluge") - conventionally armed version with an improved guidance system and warhead. It became operational in 2000. Entered service in 2004.
- Kh-BD conventional and nuclear armed version with said range up to 3000 km or greater, near or more than 5000 km range. The missile entered service in September 2023 on Tu-160 (12 missiles each). Its range was reported to be over 6,500 km (4,000 miles). and is believed to be an evolutionary development of the Kh-101/102 missiles. The Kh-BD is designed for low observability and is likely to utilize inertial guidance with Doppler radar and terrain map updates for navigation.
- Kh-50 or Kh-SD new stealthy short to medium (300 to 1500–1900 km) ranges and conventional (or also nuclear) variant (somewhat analogue of AGM-158 JASSM). Length: 6m, uses inertial/GLONASS/DSMAC guidance.
- Soumar - Likely Kh-55-derived missile produced by Iran.

It was believed originally that the RK-55 (SSC-X-4 "Slingshot" and SS-N-21 "Sampson") were land- and submarine-launched derivatives of the Kh-55, but it is now known that the Kh-55 is different from the other two as its motor drops down below the missile during flight.

== Operators ==
=== Current operators ===
- Iran: acquired 12 from Ukraine.
- China: acquired 6 from Ukraine.
- Russia: the Russian Air Force uses the Kh-55SM and Kh-555.

=== Former operators ===
- Soviet Union: the Soviet Air Force deployed the Kh-55 as its original operator, passed to successor states after the dissolution of the Soviet Union.
- Belarus
- Ukraine: ~487 scrapped, ~587 transferred to Russia

== See also ==
- 3M-54 Kalibr – developed from the Kh-55
- RK-55 – so similar to the Kh-55 it was long believed in the West to be merely a sub-/surface-launched version
- AGM-86 Air-Launched Cruise Missile – 1430 kg missile with 2400+ km range, Mach 0.73
- AGM-129 ACM (Advanced Cruise Missile – stealthy 1330 kg missile with 3700 km range) (decommissioned)
- Ra'ad ALCM - Comparable Pakistani missile of similar operational history
- BGM-109 Tomahawk – surface/sub- launched, but otherwise similar to the Kh-55
- Nirbhay (India) – Nirbhay is an all-weather low-cost medium-range cruise missile
- CJ-10 – Chinese land-attack cruise missile, believed to have incorporated elements from the Kh-55
- Soumar – Iranian land-attack cruise missile
  - Meshkat
  - Hoveyzeh
  - paveh
- Babur missile Pakistani missile

== Bibliography ==
- Gordon, Yefim (2004). Soviet/Russian Aircraft Weapons Since World War Two. Hinckley, England: Midland Publishing. ISBN 1-85780-188-1.
- Healey, John K. (January–February 2004). "Retired Warriors: "Cold War" Bomber Legacy". Air Enthusiast. No. 109. pp. 75–79. ISSN 0143-5450.
