= Kumsong-3 =

North Korean cruise missile

- Type: Anti-ship cruise missile Surface-to-surface missile
- Place of origin: North Korea

Service history
- Used by: Korean People's Army

Production history
- Manufacturer: North Korea

Specifications
- Length: 5.3 m (17 ft)
- Warhead: HE
- Warhead weight: 145 kg (320 lb)
- Engine: turbofan (or turbojet)
- Operational range: 130–250 km (81–155 mi)
- Guidance system: ARH + IRH
- Launch platform: TELAR

The Kumsong-3 (Korean: 금성-3; lit. Venus 3; KN-19 under the United States's naming convention) is a North Korean surface-to-surface anti-ship cruise missile. The technology is based on the Russian Kh-35. The missile can be launched using ground or sea platform.

== History ==
First videos were released in 2014. A flight test happened in 2015, with Kim Jong Un in attendance. The missile was launched from a Nongo-class missile boat. Missiles and a mobile launcher were presented in 2017.

A Kumsong-3 missile was displayed during the launching ceremony for the Choe Hyon destroyer ship on 25 April 2025. In this appearance, the Kumsong-3 was light blue-painted.

== Technology ==
The missile is similar to a Russian Kh-35 subsonic anti-ship cruise missile. The range is not known, but is likely around 130–250 kilometres (70–135 nmi; 81–155 mi). A main difference to the Kh-35 missile is the Kumsong-3's mobile launcher with four canisters. The launcher was developed in North Korea. The system is lacking over-the-horizon radar capability.

Image of Kumsong-3
- Test launch of Kumsong-3 in 2015
- https://assets.korearisk.com/uploads/kcna-watch/kcna_kp_en/images/MM00228728.jpg
