= Kh-35 =

Soviet anti-ship missile

Kh-35 (NATO reporting name: AS-20 'Kayak') 3M24 Uran (SS-N-25 'Switchblade') 3K60 Bal (SSC-6 'Sennight')
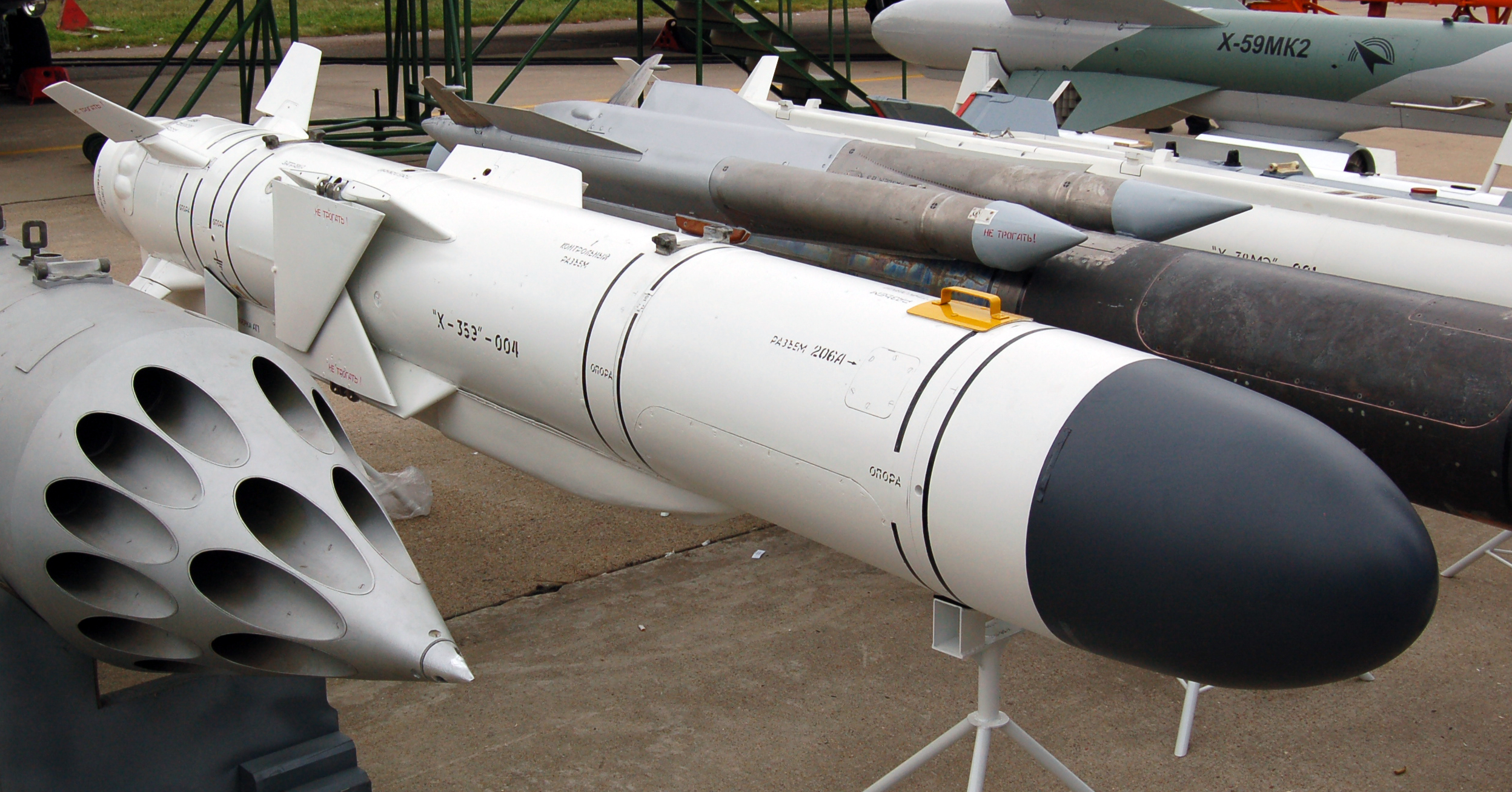
- Kh-35E in MAKS-2009
- Type: Air-to-surface; Surface-to-surface missile Cruise missile Anti-ship missile Land-attack missile
- Place of origin: Soviet Union

Service history
- In service: 2003
- Used by: Russian Navy; Indian Navy; Vietnam People's Navy

Production history
- Designer: Zvezda
- Designed: 1983–2003
- Manufacturer: Tactical Missiles Corporation
- Unit cost: $500,000 (2010)
- Produced: 1996 for export, 2003 for Russia

Specifications
- Mass: 520 kg (1,150 lb) (air version); 610 kg (1,340 lb) (surface & heli version)
- Length: 385 cm (152 in) (air version); 440 cm (173 in) (surface & heli version)
- Diameter: 42.0 cm (16.5 in)
- Wingspan: 133 cm (52.4 in)
- Warhead: HE fragmentation shaped charge
- Warhead weight: 145 kg (320 lb)
- Engine: R95TP-300 Turbofan; 360 kgf
- Propellant: kerosene
- Operational range: 130 km (70 nmi); 300 km (160 nmi) (upgrade version, 2015)
- Flight altitude: 10-15 m en route and about 4 m at terminal area
- Maximum speed: Mach 0.8 – Mach 0.85 (609–647 mph; 980–1,041 km/h)
- Guidance system: inertial guidance and ARGS-35E X-band terminal active radar homing
- Launch platform: Tupolev Tu-142, Su-24, MiG-29M/K, Sukhoi Su-35, Su-27SM, Su-30MKI//Su-30SM, Su-34, HAL Tejas, Ka-27, Ka-28, Ka-52, Su-57, also ships and boats, coastal, ALCM, TEL variants.

The Zvezda Kh-35 (Russian: Х-35, NATO reporting name AS-20 'Kayak') is a Soviet turbojet subsonic cruise anti-ship missile. The missile can be launched from helicopters, surface ships and coastal defence batteries with the help of a rocket booster, in which case it is known as Uran ('Uranus', NATO reporting name SS-N-25 'Switchblade', GRAU 3M24) or Bal ( NATO reporting name SSC-6 'Sennight', GRAU 3K60). It is designed to attack vessels up to 5,000 tonnes.

== Development ==
The previous anti-ship missiles made in USSR were highly capable, but they also were large and expensive. Therefore, the Soviet Navy found that a similar, small and very low flying missile would be useful. This new system was planned as small, cheap, and easy to install missile for a variety of platforms. This new system, called 3M24 Uran (in western nomenclature, SS-N-25) was originally meant for small surface combatants such as frigates, like the Krivak, Gepard and Neustrashimy. It was the answer to western missiles like the US Harpoon. Informally, it was also known as 'Harpoonski', as it was broadly comparable, especially in appearance, with the American missile.

The initial development started in Zvezda-Strela State Scientific-Industrial Center (GNPTs) group in 1972 or 1977, depending on the sources. Zvezda received the official go ahead to begin work on the Kh-35 in 1983–1984 by a decree of the USSR Council of Ministers and the USSR CPSU Central Committee to arm ships of medium tonnage.

Test launches began in 1985, but there were several problems and failures with the miniaturized active radar system. It was first displayed in 1992 and listed as only being intended for export, when it was, in fact, not yet for production. In 1994 India ordered Uran missiles (the Kh-35E export variant). This led to the full development, and deliveries started to the Indian Navy in 1996. Russia adopted it only in 2003 (for ships), and 2004 (Bal, coastal system). The air-launched variant (originally made for Indian Il-38SD patrol aircraft) was completed in 2005 and later deployed on Russian Federation aircraft.

The KH-35 can be considered the successor to the P-15 Termit missile, albeit much smaller and more modern. It boasts greater range than legacy missile systems, and is much cheaper than other contemporary anti-ship missiles like Kalibr or Oniks, costing an estimated $500,000 USD per missile.

== Design ==
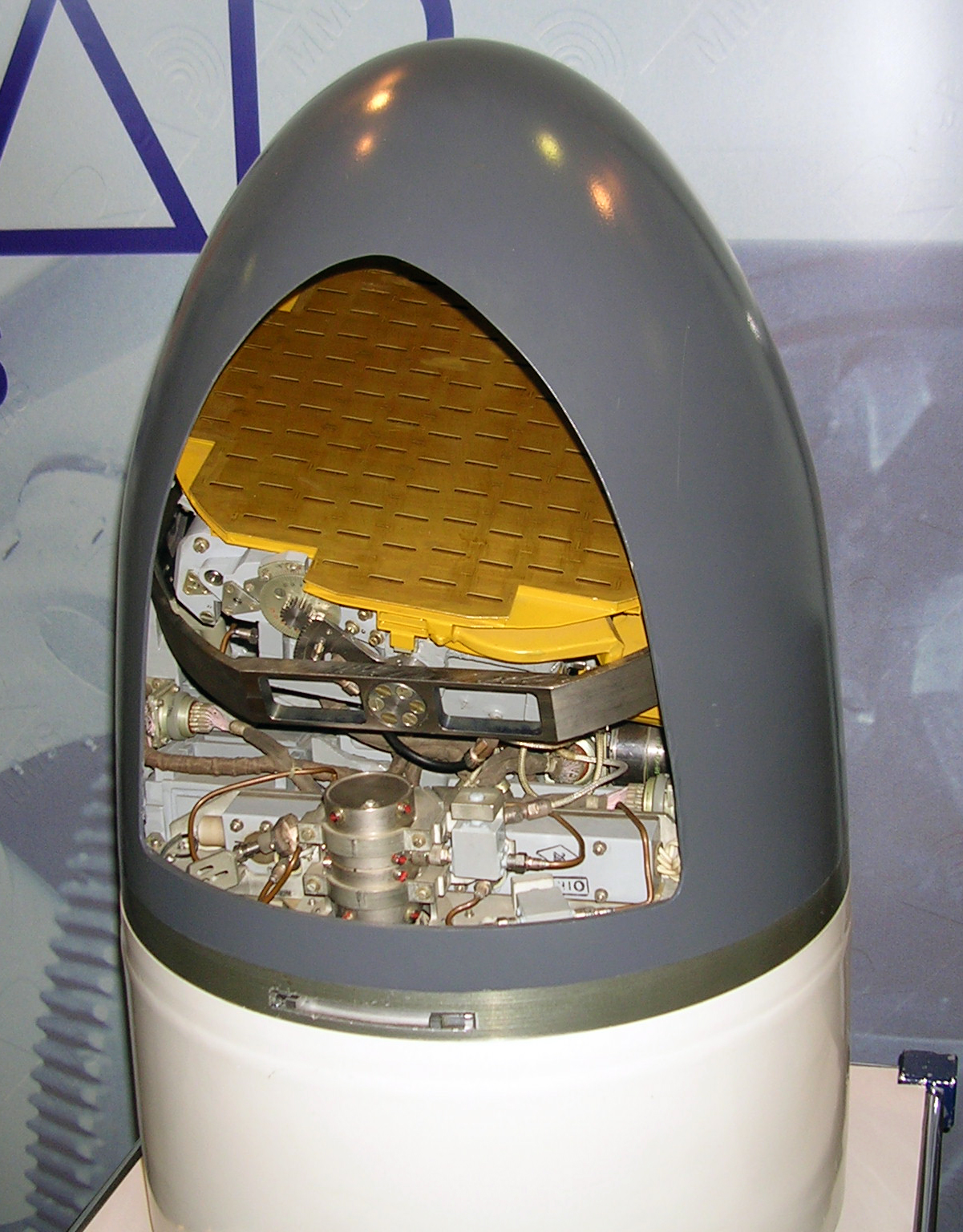
Cross-section of the active radar homing head of a Kh-35E missile at MAKS 2005

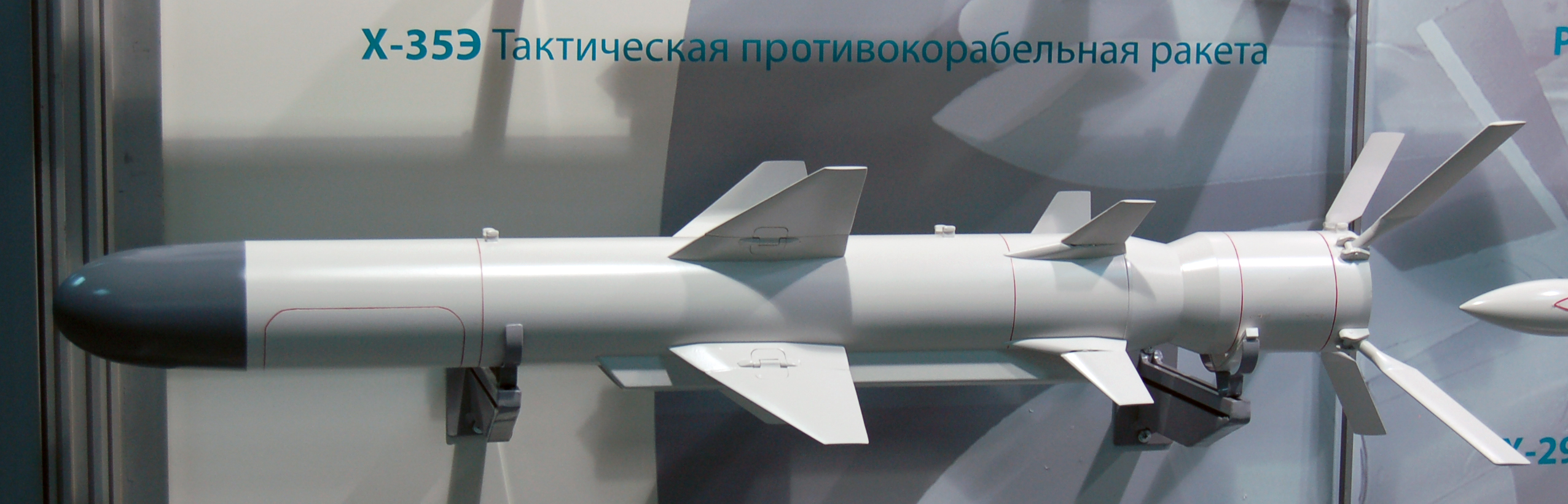
Kh-35E model at MAKS 2009

The Kh-35 missile is a subsonic weapon featuring a normal aerodynamic configuration with cruciform wings and fins and a semisubmerged air duct intake. The propulsion unit is a turbofan engine. The missile is guided to its target at the final leg of the trajectory by commands fed from the active radar homing head and the radio altimeter.

Target designation data can be introduced into the missile from the launch aircraft or ship or external sources. Flight mission data is inserted into the missile control system after input of target coordinates. An inertial system controls the missile in flight, stabilizes it at an assigned altitude and brings it to a target location area. At a certain target range, the homing head is switched on to search for, lock on and track the target. The inertial control system then turns the missile toward the target and changes its flight altitude to an extremely low one. At this altitude, the missile continues the process of homing by the data fed from the homing head and the inertial control system until a hit is obtained.

The Kh-35 can be employed in fair and adverse weather conditions at sea states up to 5–6, by day and night, under enemy fire and electronic countermeasures. Its aerodynamic configuration is optimized for high subsonic-speed sea-skimming flight to ensure stealthy characteristics of the missile. The missile has low signatures thanks to its small dimensions, sea-skimming capability and a special guidance algorithm ensuring highly secure operational modes of the active radar seeker.

Its ARGS-35E active radar seeker operates in both single and multiple missile launch modes, acquiring and locking on targets at a maximum range of up to 20 km. A new radar seeker, Gran-KE has been developed by SPE Radar MMS and will be replacing the existing ARGS-35E X band seeker.

| | | Kh-35 | Kh-35U |
|---|---|---|---|
| Length | Ship/Land/Heliborne | 4.4 m (14 ft) | |
| Length | Aircraft-launched | 3.85 m (12.6 ft) | |
| Diameter | | 0.42 m (17 in) | |
| Wingspan | | 1.33 m (4.4 ft) | |
| Weight | Surface-launched | 620 kg (1,370 lb) | 670 kg (1,480 lb) |
| Weight | Aircraft-launched | 520 kg (1,150 lb) | 550 kg (1,210 lb) |
| Weight | Heliborne | 610 kg (1,340 lb) | 650 kg (1,430 lb) |
| Range | | 130 km (81 mi; 70 nmi) | 7–260 km (4–162 mi; 4–140 nmi) |
| Guidance | | Inertial, active radar | Inertial, satellite navigation, active/passive radar |
| Seeker range | | 20 km (12 mi; 11 nmi) | 50 km (31 mi; 27 nmi) |
| Speed | | Mach 0.8 (609 mph; 980 km/h) | Mach 0.8 – Mach 0.85 (609–647 mph; 980–1,041 km/h) |
| Flight altitude | Cruising | 10–15 m | |
| Flight altitude | Terminal phase | 4 m | |
| Warhead | | 145 kg (320 lb) HE penetrator | 145 kg (320 lb) penetrating HE frag |

== Operational history ==
The Kh-35 missile entered service with Russian Navy only in 2003. In July 2003, the system created by the "Tactical Missiles Corporation" passed the state tests and began to come into service of ships of the Russian Navy. It has also been acquired by India. The Bal coastal missile system showed excellent results in state tests in the fall of 2004, and entered service in 2008. The tests of the upgraded Kh-35UE missile were completed as of June 2021.

A Bal system has four self-propelled launcher vehicles each carrying eight missiles for a total of 32 missiles in a salvo, plus reloads for another wave. The launchers can be up to 10 km from the coast and hit targets at ranges up to 120 km (75 mi; 65 nmi). Currently, the Bal system is equipped with an upgraded version of the Kh-35E increasing the range to 300 km (190 mi; 160 nmi). At IMDS 2019, a new version of the Russian Bal-E coastal defence system was presented for the first time. The four-tube Rubezh-ME, dedicated to the export market, is based on a Kamaz 63501 8x8 chassis which is more compact than the MZKT-7930 of the original Bal-E. As reported on October 19, 2021 by the TASS news agency, a new missile of the Bal coastal missile complex developed and manufactured by Tactical Missile Armament Corporation (KTRV) will allow hitting targets at a distance of over 500 km. The new capabilities of the complex made it comparable in range and the possibility of firing on the ground with the Bastion missile system using the Onyx supersonic missile, a source in the defense industry said.

On 20 August 2024, at the Congress of Local and Regional Authorities, Commander-in-Chief of the Armed Forces of Ukraine Oleksandr Syrskyi for the first time announced data on how many weapons Russia has used since 2022, as well as how many were intercepted. The report said that only 1/15 (6.7%) of Kh-35s were intercepted by Ukraine’s air defenses.

== Variants ==
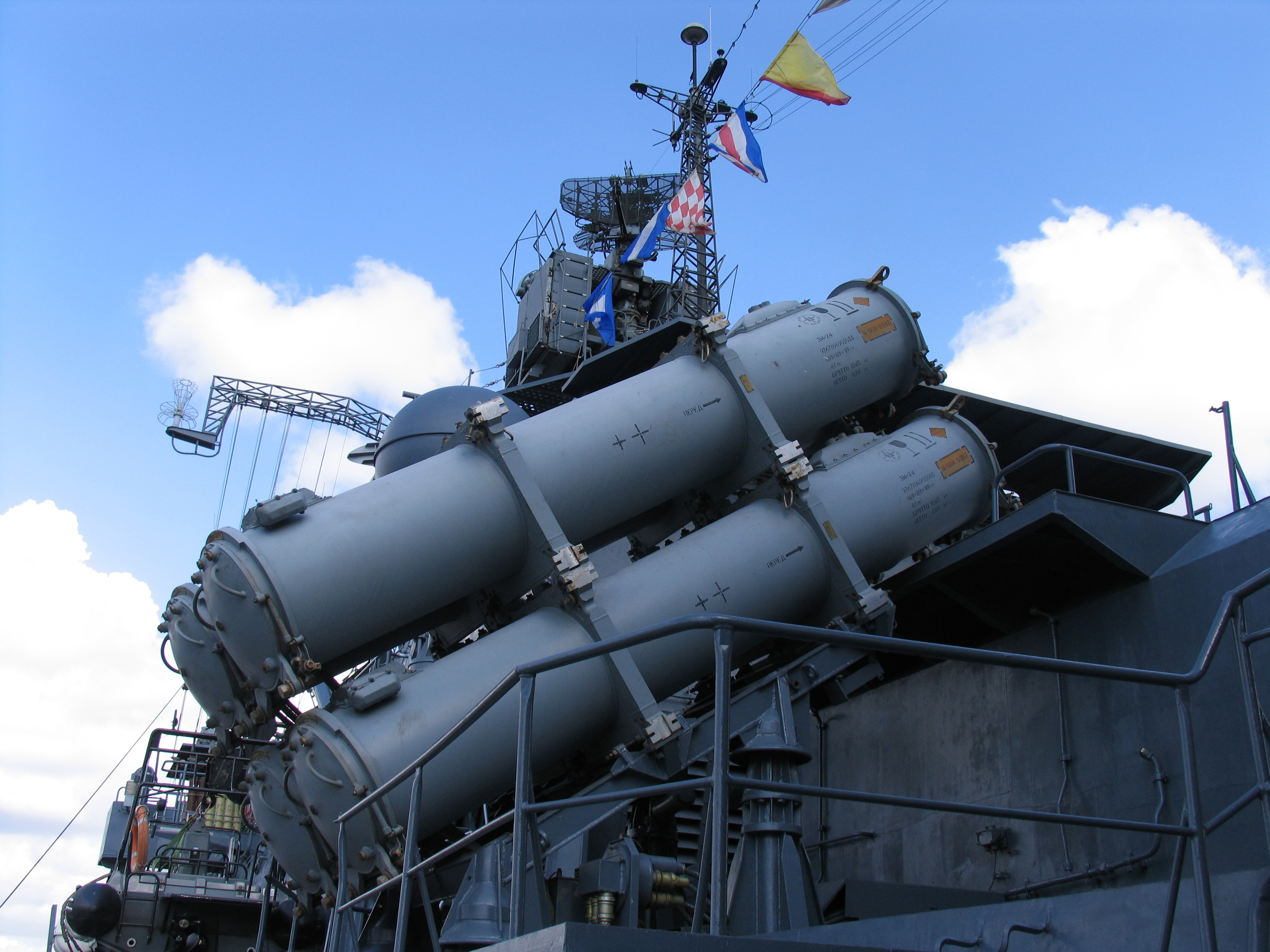
The KT-184 quadruple launcher mounted on Russian frigate Yaroslav Mudry

- Kh-35 (3M-24) - Base naval version for Russia (2003).
- Kh-35E (3M-24E) - Export version of Kh-35 (1996).
- Kh-35U - Base upgrade unified missile (can be used with any carrier), version for Russia in production (as of July 1, 2015). Capable of striking land targets.
- Kh-35UE - Export version of Kh-35U, in production.
- Kh-35UV - Helicopter-launched version, intended for the Kamov Ka-52K.
- Kh-35EMV - Export version of Kh-35 missile-target without warhead for Vietnam.
- Kh-35E (Uran-E) (SS-N-25 'Switchblade', 3M-24) - Shipborne equipment of the control system with a missile Kh-35/Kh-35E.
- Bal/Bal-E - Coastal (SSC-6 Sennight) missile complex with Kh-35/Kh-35E missiles (2008).
- Rubez-ME - Coastal missile complex with 4 Kh-35/Kh-35U missiles. Compact version of the Bal-E, dedicated for the export .
- Bal - coastal mobile missile complex
  Kumsong-3 (KN-19) - Reported North Korean copy of the Kh-35U. Kumsong-3 is a North Korean domestic variant/clone of Kh-35 likely based on Kh-35U due to range. Demonstrated range in 8 June 2017 test is 240 km.
- Neptune - Ukrainian derivative

== Operators ==
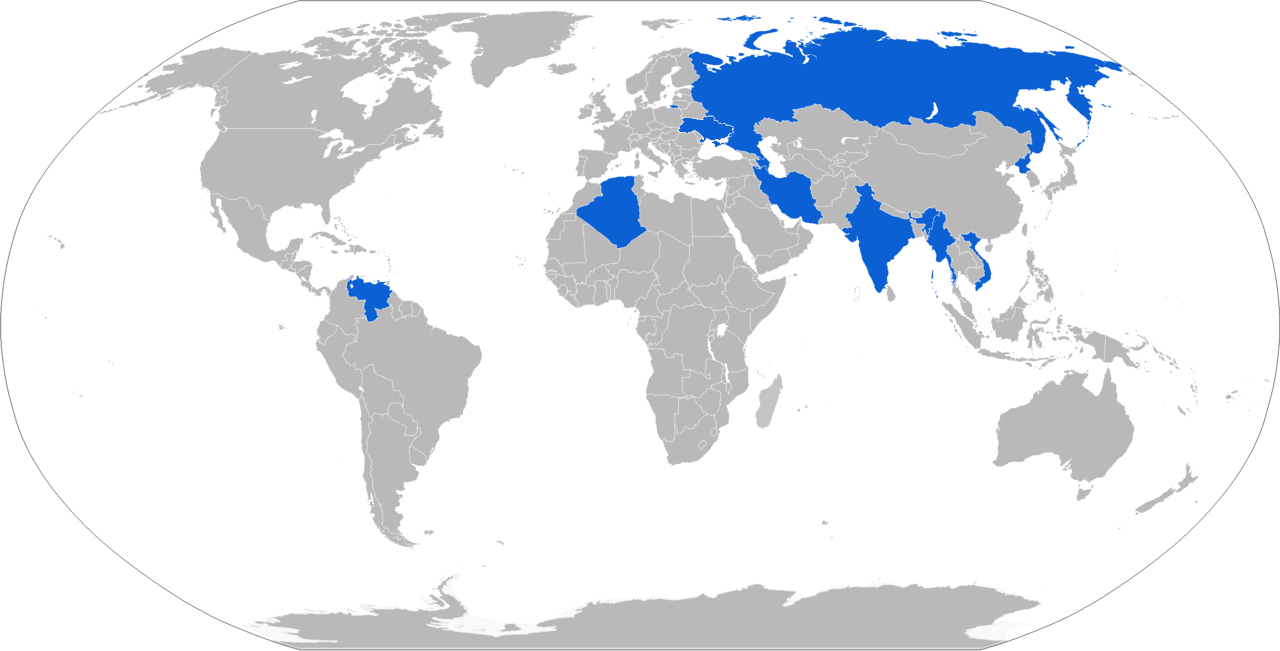
Map with Kh-35 operators in blue

=== Current operators ===
- Algeria
- India
- Iran
- Myanmar
- Egypt
- North Korea – Kh-35U derivative Kumsong/GeumSeong-3 (Venus 3) 금성3호 金星3号.
  - Mobile coastal defence (anti-ship) system KN-19 on a tracked chassis.
  - Believed to be also able launched with Ilyushin Il-28/H-5 due to missiles being stored at Uiju Airfield, home to these bombers.
- Russia – 112 Kh-35 (3M-24) delivered in 2009–2010.
  - Bal coastal missile brigades deployed by the Russian Navy:
    - 11th Black Sea Fleet Brigade, Utash, Krasnodar
    - 46th Separate Division of the Caspian Flotilla, Dagestan
    - 15th Black Sea Fleet Brigade, Sevastopol, Crimea
    - 72nd Pacific Fleet Regiment, Smolyaninovo, Primorsky Krai
    - At least one more complex was delivered to the Western Military District in mid-2016.
    - Two Bal missile systems delivered in 2017 and one more in November 2018 for the BSF. Three more systems in 2019 and 2020 for the PF, CFl and BF.
    - A deployment was moved to the Sredny Peninsula in 2019.
  - The Russian Air Force has acquired since 2014 an unknown number of Kh-35U missiles integrated with the Sukhoi Su-35S fighter aircraft and the Sukhoi Su-34 fighter-bombers.
- Venezuela – Bal Coastal missile complex being delivered.
- Vietnam – 340 Kh-35E missiles delivered in 2001–2021. A local copy designated as VCM-01 is being developed by Viettel.
- Ukraine – Kh-35 derivative Neptune

=== Failed bid ===
- Azerbaijan – Bal Coastal missile complex suspended

== See also ==
- AGM-158C LRASM – (United States)
- NASM-MR – (India)
- Exocet – (France)
- A/R/UGM-84 Harpoon – (United States)
- Naval Strike Missile – (Norway)
- Otomat – (Italy, France)
- RBS 15 – (Sweden)
- Sea Eagle – (United Kingdom)
- Type 80 air-to-ship missile – (Japan)
- Type 88 surface-to-ship missile – (Japan)
- Type 90 ship-to-ship missile – (Japan)
- Type 93 air-to-ship missile – (Japan)
- YJ-83 – (China)

== External sources ==
Media related to Zvezda Kh-35 at Wikimedia Commons

- KH-35 at CSIS Missile Threat
