= Hoveyzeh (cruise missile) =

Iranian cruise missile

Hoveyzeh cruise missile
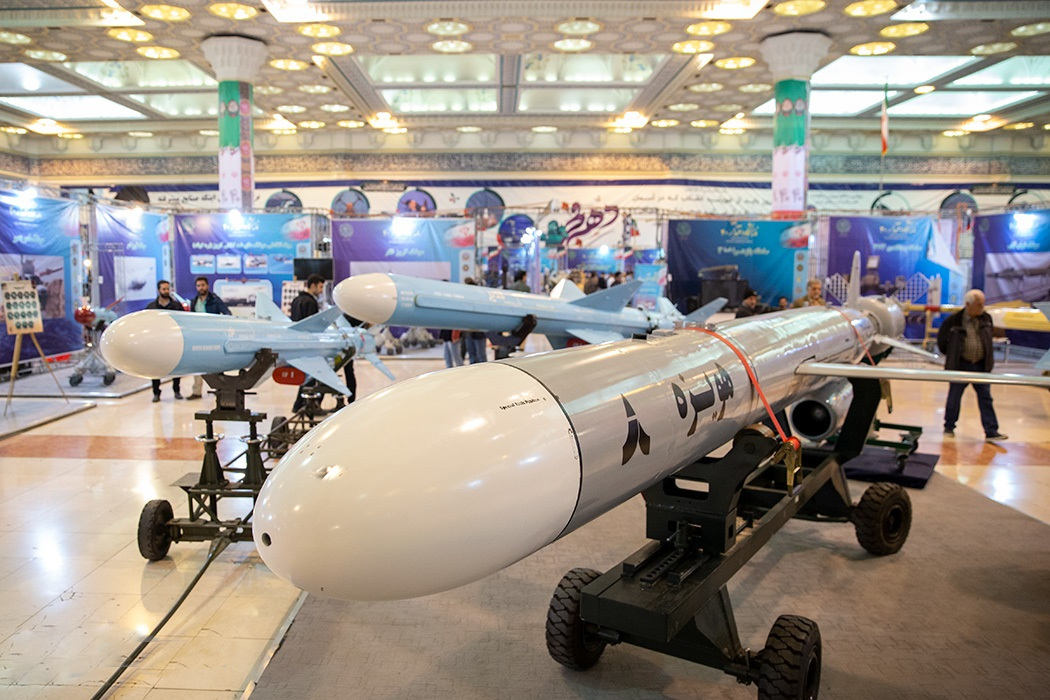
- Type: Cruise missile
- Place of origin: Iran

Service history
- In service: 2019–present
- Used by: Iran

Specifications
- Propellant: Turbo-jet engine
- Operational range: 1,350 km (839 miles)
- Flight altitude: Sea-skimming
- Guidance system: Inertial navigation system
- Accuracy: 1 m
- Launch platform: Multiple Launch Rocket System

The Hoveyzeh (Persian: موشک کروز هویزه) is an Iranian designed and built, all-weather, surface-to-surface cruise missile. The Hoveyzeh is from the Soumar family of cruise missiles. The missile was unveiled at a defense exhibition in Tehran on 2 February 2019 during celebrations of the 40th anniversary of the 1979 Iranian Revolution.

The surface-to-surface cruise missile is capable of low altitude flight and has a range of 1,350 km, with the ability to strike ground targets with high precision and accuracy.

== Name ==
The Hoveyzeh surface-to-surface cruise missile is named in honor of the Iranian town of Hoveyzeh in the Khuzestan province. The city sustained heavy casualties and ubiquitous damage during the war and was a victim of chemical weapons used by Iraqi forces during the Iran–Iraq War.

== Development ==
The Hoveyzeh is a part of the Soumar cruise missile family, which was unveiled in 2015 with the first missile of the family being the Soumar which had a range of 700 km. Although this claim is disputed by some media outlets claiming that due to the missile's similarities with the Kh-55, acquired from Ukraine in 2001, that the Soumar missile has a range of 2,000–3,000 km. It is believed that the Hoveizeh is either an upgrade to or has been developed from the Soumar.

It was unveiled and displayed to the public on 2 February 2019 at a Tehran defense exhibition celebrating the 40th anniversary of the 1979 Iranian Revolution. The missile was put into service and will be supplied to the Aerospace force of the Islamic Revolutionary Guard Corps.

During Iranian Defense Minister Brigadier General Amir Hatami's interview with the press about the missile, he stated that the missile has been designed and manufactured by Iran Aviation Industries Organization (IAIO) with the missile being tested on the day of the unveiling, complemented with video evidence, successfully travelling 1,200 km and striking test targets with precision accuracy.

== Capabilities ==
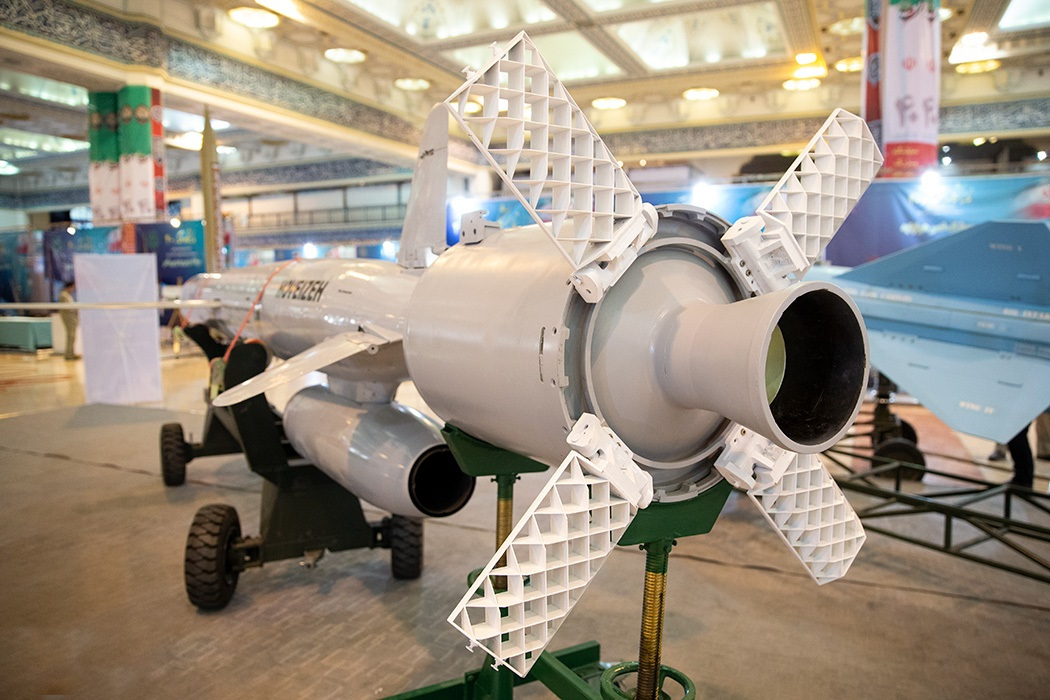
Rear view of the missile

Israeli military intelligence website DEBKAfile states that: "Iran has succeeded in producing low-flying cruise missiles that fly to target under the radar."

== Operators ==
- Iran – number of units is unknown

== See also ==
- Defense industry of Iran
- List of military equipment manufactured in Iran
- Iranian underground missile bases
- Armed Forces of the Islamic Republic of Iran
- Islamic Republic of Iran Army
- Iran Electronics Industries
- Science and technology in Iran
- Hoveyzeh (armored car)
