= Ya-Ali (missile) =

Iranian air-launched cruise missile

- Place of origin: Iran

Service history
- In service: 2015–present
- Used by: See Users
- Wars: Possibly Yemeni Civil War (2015–present)

Production history
- Variants: See Variants

Specifications
- Engine: Turbojet
- Operational range: 700 km
- Launch platform: Aircraft

The Ya-Ali (Persian: یاعلی) is an air-launched cruise missile (ALCM) built by Iran. The missile was first unveiled on 11 May 2014 when Iranian leader Grand Ayatollah Ali Khamenei visited the Aerospace Force of the Army of the Guardians of the Islamic Revolution. According to Janes Defence, the missile has a jet engine inlet and possibly uses a version of the Toloue-4 turbojet or different Toloue 10 or 13 engines Iran produces for its longer-range anti-ship missiles and it is reported to have a range of 700 km. On February 7, 2015, Iran's Deputy Defense Minister Mohammad Eslami announced that the missile could previously be launched from only Mirage type fighter planes but it can now be launched from every fighter plane that Iran owns. It is named after a Shi'i religious expression beseeching imam Ali. As an ALCM, the Ya-Ali is distinct from the ground launched cruise missiles (GLCMs) in the Houthi inventory. According to Jane's Defense Weekly, the Houthis may have used a Quds 1 GLCM in the Abha International Airport attack on 12 June 2019. This airport in southwestern Saudi Arabia is less than 200 km from the Yemeni border. The Iranian Ya-Ali has a much longer range due to being imparted with much more kinetic and potential energy when released from a fighter aircraft such as the Mirage type. The Houthis have no fighter aircraft in their inventory.

Jane's Defense Weekly reported on September 16, 2019 that, according to US officials, "There are indications that the 14 September attack on two oil facilities in Saudi Arabia were carried out using cruise missiles launched from Iraq or possibly Iran." It went on to say "the impact points showed the weapons approached from the west northwest, rather than Yemen, as claimed by the Iranian-backed Yemeni rebel group Ansar Allah (Houthis). 'It is very difficult to see how these things could have come from anywhere but Iran or Iraq,' CNN quoted the official as saying." Some of the targets struck on September 14, 2019 were oil processing facilities at Abqaiq, Saudi Arabia. Abqaiq is located near Bahrain, is approximately 1,000 km from the Houthi-controlled portion of Yemen, and is approximately 300 km from Iran.

== Operators ==
- Iran

== See also ==
- Ya-Ali
- Ra'ad
- Ra'ad-II
