= Soumar (missile) =

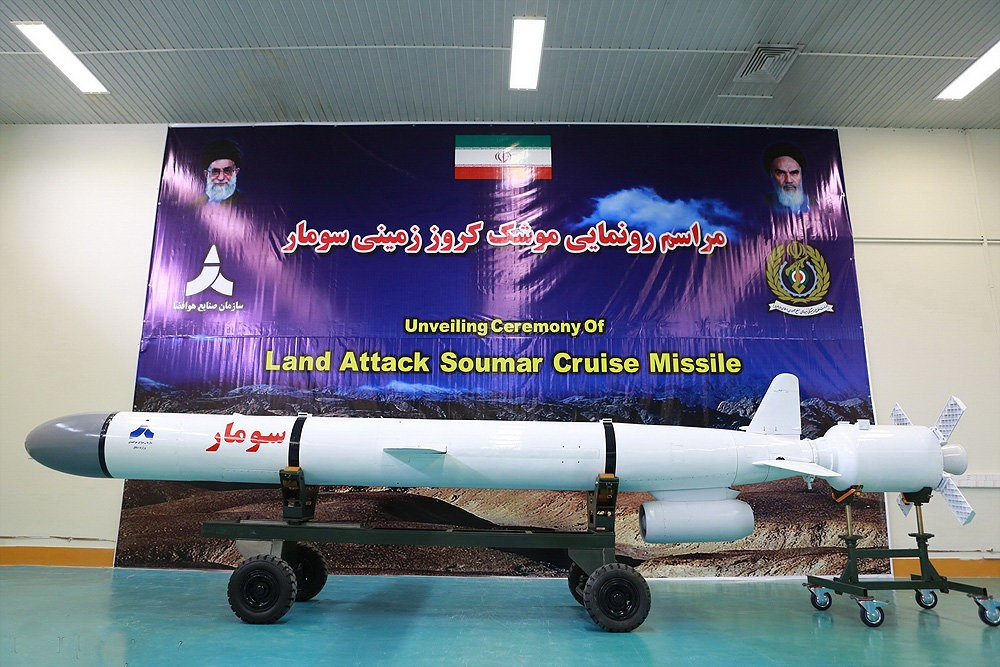
- Soumar
- Type: Cruise missile
- Place of origin: Iran

Service history
- In service: 2012-present
- Used by: See Users

Production history
- Variants: See Variants

The Soumar (Persian: سومار) is an Iranian long-range cruise missile. The missile was named in the honour of a village called Soumar, whose inhabitants were all killed when Saddam Hussein’s regime attacked the village with chemical weapons. It is highly likely that the missile is derived from the Russian / Soviet Kh-55, several of which were illegally sold to Iran by Ukraine in 2001.

According to Jonathan Ruhe and Blake Fleisher from the Gemunder Center for Defense and Strategy (part of the Jewish Institute for National Security Affairs, Washington D.C.), nuclear capable cruise missiles, such as the Soumar, were overlooked in the Joint Comprehensive Plan of Action (JCPOA) on Iran's nuclear program and UN Security Council Resolution 2231.

In 2015 a long-range cruise missile was revealed under the name “Soumar”. The design closely resembles the Kh-55 that Iran acquired from Ukraine in 2001. Because of the similarities media have speculated its range as between 2000 and 3000 km.

On 2 February 2019 Iran unveiled the Hoveyzah Cruise Missile, a surface-to-surface missile with a claimed range of more than 1,350 kilometres during celebrations marking the 40th anniversary of the 1979 Islamic revolution.

== See also ==
- Kheibarshekan
- Tosan (missile)
- Persian Gulf (missile)
