= Hollywood =

Hollywood usually refers to:

- Hollywood, Los Angeles, a neighborhood widely recognized as the center of the U.S. film industry
- Hollywood, a metonym for the commercial cinema of the United States

Hollywood may also refer to:

== Places ==
=== United States ===
- Hollywood District (disambiguation)
- Hollywood, Alabama, a town in Jackson County
- Hollywood, Homewood, Alabama and Hollywood Historic District, a former town and a historic district
- Hollywood, Florida, a coastal city in Broward County
- Hollywood, Georgia, an unincorporated community in Habersham County, Georgia
- Hollywood, Maryland
- Hollywood, Minnesota
- Hollywood Township, Carver County, Minnesota
- Hollywood, Mississippi
- Hollywood (Benoit, Mississippi)
- Hollywood, Missouri
- Hollywood, New Mexico, a neighborhood of Ruidoso, Lincoln County, New Mexico
- Hollywood, Portland, Oregon, a neighborhood in Portland, Oregon
- Hollywood, Luzerne County, Pennsylvania
- Hollywood, Montgomery County, Pennsylvania
- Hollywood, South Carolina
- Hollywood, Memphis, Tennessee
- Hollywood, Pittsylvania County, Virginia
- Hollywood Cemetery (Richmond, Virginia)
- Hollywood, Monroe County, West Virginia
- Hollywood, Raleigh County, West Virginia
- Hollywood, Washington, a part of Diablo, Washington
- Hollywood Boulevard, Los Angeles, California
- Florida State Road 820, Hollywood, Florida, also known as Hollywood Boulevard

=== Train stations ===
- Hollywood station (Florida), a historic train station in Hollywood, Florida
- Hollywood station (Illinois), a station on Metra's BNSF Line in Brookfield, Illinois

=== Elsewhere ===
- Hollywood, County Wicklow, Ireland, a village
- Holywood, County Down, Northern Ireland, a town
- Hollywood, Worcestershire, England, a large village next to Birmingham
- Hollywood Private Hospital, Perth, Australia
- Hollywood Road, Hong Kong
- Hollywood Senior High School, Perth, Australia

== Science and technology ==
- Hollywood (database), an RNA splicing database
- Hollywood (graphics chip)
- Hollywood (programming language), a multimedia-oriented programming language
- Hollywood (tree) (Auranticarpa rhombifolia), an Australian tree

== Arts and entertainment ==
=== Fictional characters and toys ===
- Hollywood, a character in the series 2 Stupid Dogs
- Hollywood, a mail-offer Flutter Pony from the original My Little Pony toyline
- Hollywood Montrose, a character in the 1987 film Mannequin
- Rick "Hollywood" Neven, a fighter pilot in the 1986 film Top Gun
- Milt "Hollywood" Zane, a soldier played by Luke Pegler in the 2016 film Hacksaw Ridge

=== Film, television episodes and shows ===
- Hollywood (1923 film) (1923), a silent comedy film by James Cruze
- Hollywood (British TV series) (1980), a British documentary television series about the silent era
- Hollywood (2002 film), a Kannada film starring Upendra as a robot
- "Hollywood" (Law & Order: LA) (2010), an episode of Law & Order: Los Angeles
- Hollywood (miniseries) (2020), an American television miniseries from Netflix
- Hollywood Pictures, a former film production label of The Walt Disney Studios

=== Television channels ===
- Canal Hollywood, a Portuguese television channel
- Hollywood (Russian TV channel), a Russian television channel replacing AMC in the region

=== Music ===
==== Albums ====
- Hollywood (Circle album) (2008)
- Hollywood (Flavor Flav album) (2006)
- Hollywood (Little Birdy album) (2006)
- Hollywood (Jamie Foxx album) (2015)
- Hollywood (Johnny Hallyday album) (1979)
- Hollywood (The Puppini Sisters album) (2011)
- Hollywood (Tercer Cielo album) (2008)
- Hollywood (EP), by Angus & Julia Stone
- Hollywood, by Nana Mouskouri
- Hollywood, 1977, in the Véronique Sanson discography

==== Songs ====
- "Hollywood" (Car Seat Headrest song), 2020
- "Hollywood" (Connie Francis song), 1961
- "Hollywood" (The Cranberries song), 1997
- "Hollywood" (Estevan Plazola song), 2020
- "Hollywood" (Gorillaz song), 2018
- "Hollywood" (Jay-Z song), 2007
- "Hollywood" (Kasey Chambers song), 2004
- "Hollywood" (Madonna song), 2003
- "Hollywood" (Marina and the Diamonds song), 2010
- "Hollywood" (Michael Bublé song), 2010
- "Hollywood" (YG and Shoreline Mafia song), 2025
- "Hollywood (Africa)", 1985, by Red Hot Chili Peppers
- "Hollywood (Down on Your Luck)", 1981, by Thin Lizzy
- "Hollywood/I Am the Resurrection", a double A-side single by Codeine Velvet Club (2009)
- "Hollywood", by After Midnight Project from Let's Build Something to Break (2009)
- "Hollywood", by Alabama from Feels So Right (1981)
- "Hollywood", by America from Holiday (1974)
- "Hollywood", by Bilal from the unreleased album Love for Sale
- "Hollywood", by Boz Scaggs from Down Two Then Left (1977)
- "Hollywood", by Collective Soul from Afterwords (2007)
- "Hollywood", by Daniel Powter from Daniel Powter (2005)
- "Hollywood", by Dog's Eye View from Daisy (1997)
- "Hollywood", by Jonas Brothers from Jonas Brothers (2006)
- "Hollywood", by Labelle from Pressure Cookin' (1973)
- "Hollywood" and "Hollywood's Dead", unreleased songs by Lana Del Rey
- "Hollywood", by Lewis Capaldi from Divinely Uninspired to a Hellish Extent (2019)
- "Hollywood", by Nickelback from Silver Side Up (2001)
- "Hollywood", an unreleased song recorded by Pink Floyd
- "Hollywood", by P.O.D. from The Fundamental Elements of Southtown (1999)
- "Hollywood", by Rick James from Come Get It! (1978)
- "Hollywood", by Rufus and Chaka Khan from Ask Rufus (1977)
- "Hollywood", by The Runaways from Queens of Noise (1977)
- "Hollywood", by Saliva from Every Six Seconds (2001)
- "Hollywood", by Shooting Star from Hang On for Your Life (1981)
- "Hollywood", by Silverchair on "Without You" (2002)
- "Hollywood", by Smile.dk from Future Girls (2000)
- "Hollywood", by Streetheart
- "Hollywood", by Suzi Quatro from Suzi ... and Other Four Letter Words (1979)
- "Hollywood", by The Veronicas on "Untouched" (2007)
- "Hollywood", by Waterloo & Robinson (1974)

==== Other uses in music ====
- Hollywood, a 1990s female UK/Swedish electro pop duo, part of the Romo movement
- Hollywood, early bandname of Glyder (band)
- Hollywood Records, an American record label part of the Disney Music Group
- Hollywood Music Festival, a 1970 UK rock festival

=== Novels ===
- Hollywood (Bukowski novel), 1989, by Charles Bukowski
- Hollywood (Vidal novel), 1990, by Gore Vidal

=== Other arts ===
- Hollywood (video game), a 1995 creative writing computer game
- Hollywood, a magazine that merged with Motion Picture Magazine
- Hollywood, part five of the limited series Herogasm as part of The Boys comic book franchise

== Brands and businesses ==
- Hollywood (cigarette), a Brazilian brand of cigarettes
- Hollywood.com, an American entertainment news website
- Hollywood Candy Company or Hollywood Brands, a defunct American confectionery company
- Hollywood (gum), a French brand of chewing gum
- Hollywood Video, a former DVD and video game rental shop chain

== People ==
=== Surname ===
- Edwin L. Hollywood (1892–1958), American film director
- Gary Hollywood (born 1979), Scottish actor
- Jesse James Hollywood (born 1980), American convicted murderer
- Matt Hollywood (born 1973), American indie rock musician
- Paul Hollywood (born 1966), English chef

=== Nickname, ring, or stage name ===
- Hollywood (wrestler) (born 1969), American professional wrestler
- Hollywood Bob Holly, a name used briefly by professional wrestler Bob Holly (born 1963)
- Hollywood Brown, American National Football League wide receiver Marquise Brown (born 1997)
- Hollywood Fats, American blues guitarist Michael Leonard Mann (1954–1986)
- Hollywood Hogan or Hulk Hogan, ring names of American professional wrestler Terry Gene Bollea (1953–2025)
- Hollywood Zakoshisyoh, Japanese comedian Shigeki Nakazawa (born 1974)
- Scott Scurlock (1955–1996), American bank robber nicknamed the "Hollywood Bandit" or simply "Hollywood"
- Thomas Henderson (American football) (born 1953), American former National Football League player
- Tom Marechek (born 1968), Canadian former lacrosse player

== See also ==
- Bollywood, nickname for the Hindi (Indian) cinema industry
- Nollywood, nickname for the Nigerian cinema industry
- Holli Would, a character in the film Cool World
- Holly wood, wood from a holly plant
- Holly Wood (disambiguation)
- Hollywood Blonds, name used by several professional wrestling tag teams
- The Hollywood Flames, American R&B vocal group in the 1950s
- Hollywood on the Nile, nickname for the Egyptian film industry
- Holy Wood (disambiguation)
- Mollywood (disambiguation)
- Palo santo (disambiguation) (Spanish: "Holy Wood")
- Pollywood (disambiguation)
- Tinsel town (disambiguation)
- Tollywood (disambiguation)
