= Payday (confection) =

Candy bar containing peanuts and caramel

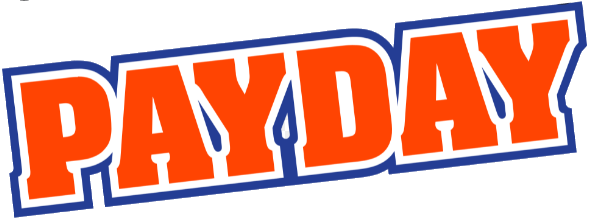
- Payday logo
- Product type: Peanut caramel bar
- Current owner: Iconic IP Interests, LLC
- Produced by: The Hershey Company
- Country: United States
- Introduced: 1932; 94 years ago
- Related brands: Hershey's; NutRageous
- Markets: United States
- Previous owners: Hollywood Candy Company; Leaf, Inc.
- Tagline: "Totally Nuts about Payday" "Get To It"

Payday, officially styled PAYDAY and previously sometimes PayDay, is a brand of a candy bar first introduced in 1932 by the Hollywood Candy Company. The original Payday candy bar consists of salted peanuts rolled over a nougat-like sweet caramel center. Since 1996, classic Payday candy bars without chocolate have been continually produced by the Hershey Company. In 2020, Hershey's released a "Chocolatey Payday bar" as a permanent part of the Payday product line; it is identical to the regular bar, but covered by a layer of compound chocolate paste, including cocoa and chocolate.

== History ==
Payday was first introduced in 1932 by the Hollywood Candy Company and got its name because it was first produced on payday at the company. Payday was marketed during the Great Depression as a meal replacement because of its dense peanut outer layer. Headed by Frank Martoccio, who had founded the F.A. Martoccio Macaroni Company, Hollywood also produced the Zero bar, originally called the Double Zero when first released in 1920. In 1938, Hollywood moved to Centralia, Illinois. In 1967, the Martoccio family sold Hollywood Brands to Consolidated Foods, which later became Sara Lee. Fire destroyed the Centralia plant in 1980. Production of the Payday bar continued with help from the L.S. Heath and Sons Company until a new facility could be constructed. In 1988, Hollywood Brands was acquired by the Leaf Candy Company and then later became part of the Hershey Company in 1996 via its acquisition of Leaf North America.

Payday was named the #3 candy bar in the 2019 LA Times Candy Bar Power Rankings.

== Product history ==
Peanut-dense Payday bars were introduced in 1932 when candy bars were often viewed as meal replacements. Variations of the classic Payday have included a glazed honey limited edition in 2003 and the Payday Pro, a high protein energy bar, in 2005. For a promotion in 1989, Payday candy bars each contained an individually wrapped nickel.

Payday has a long history of offering chocolate-covered bars in its product line. In the 1980s, when owned by Sara Lee, there was a chocolate-covered Payday. The Hershey Company has produced a limited version of chocolate PayDay in 2006 and the Payday Chocolatey Avalanche in 2007, which was later discontinued. In August 2020, Hershey's released the Chocolatey Payday candy bar as a permanent part of the product line.

== Products currently available ==
=== Payday ===
Payday
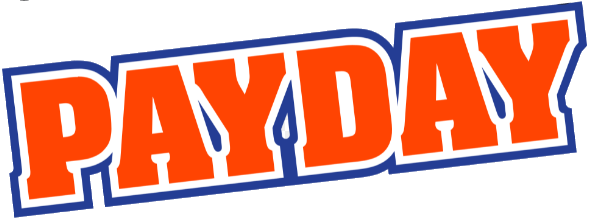

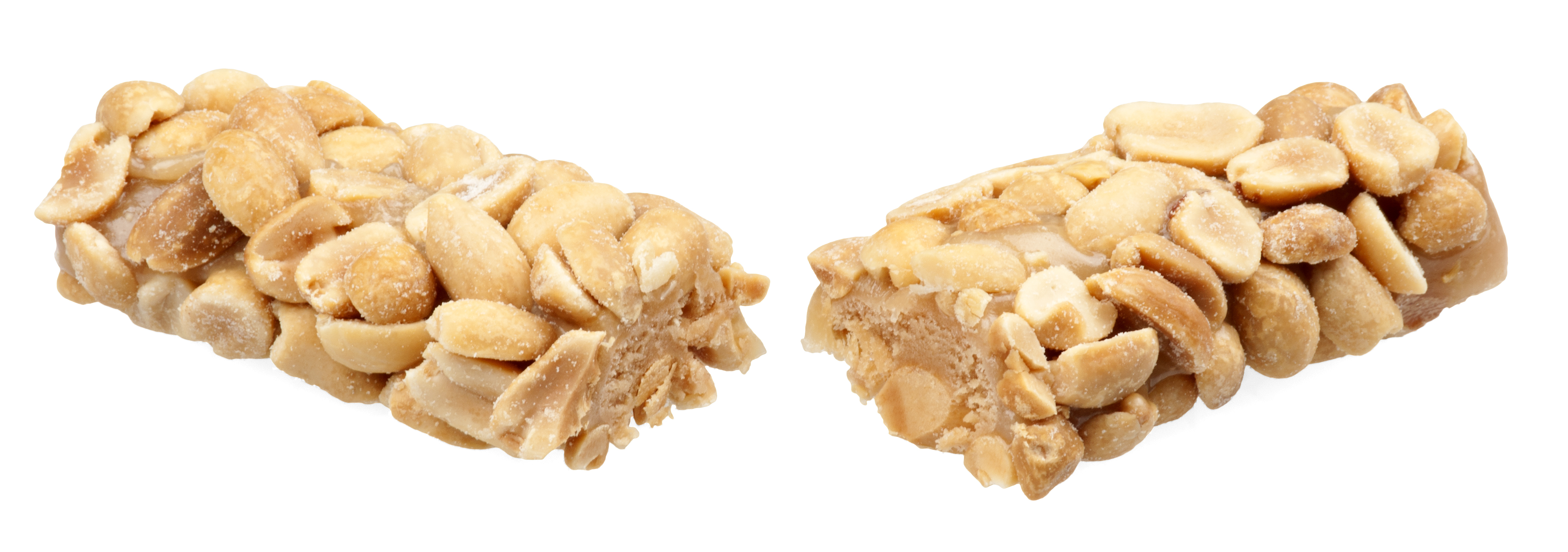
- A caramel candy bar covered in peanuts
- Type: Peanut caramel candy bar
- Inventor: Frank Martoccio - Hollywood Candy Company
- Inception: 1932; 94 years ago
- Manufacturer: The Hershey Company
- Available: Yes
- Website: www.hersheyland.com/payday

The original Payday candy bar has been available since 1932. Payday contains peanuts and caramel. There is also a king-size bar found in most stores (96 g).

==== Nutrition ====
Payday peanut caramel bar
Nutritional value per 100 g (3.5 oz)
- Energy: 1,931 kJ (462 kcal)
- Carbohydrates: 51.9 g
- Sugars: 40.4 g
- Fat: 25 g
- Saturated: 4.8 g
- Trans: 0 g
- Protein: 13.5 g
Vitamins and minerals
Minerals	Quantity %DV^{†}
Calcium	8% 98.1 mg
Iron	11% 1.9 mg
Potassium	13% 384.6 mg
Sodium	10% 230.8 mg
- Other constituents: Quantity
- Cholesterol: 0 mg
- Serving size is 1 1.85oz (or 52 g) bar
- ^{†}Percentages estimated using US recommendations for adults, except for potassium, which is estimated based on expert recommendation from the National Academies. Source: Smart Label

==== Ingredients ====
Peanuts, sugar, corn syrup, skim milk, vegetable oil, palm oil, sunflower oil Contains 2% or Less of: Salt, carrageenan, mono- and diglycerides

===== Allergens =====
- Payday contains powdered milk and peanuts.

===== Features and certifications =====
- Country of manufacture: USA
- Gluten free
- OU-D

=== Chocolatey Payday ===
Chocolatey Payday
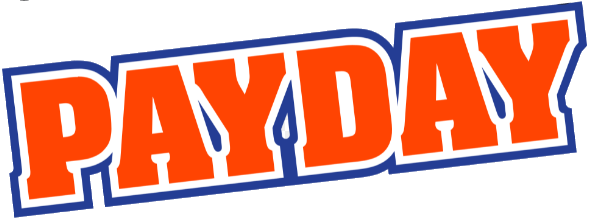

- Type: Chocolate peanut caramel candy bar
- Inventor: The Hershey Company
- Inception: August 2020; 6 years ago
- Manufacturer: The Hershey Company
- Available: Yes
- Website: www.hersheyland.com/chocolate-payday

The Chocolatey Payday was added to the permanent brand portfolio in August 2020. Chocolatey Paydays contain salted peanuts and caramel and are coated in compound chocolate paste. The chocolatey candy bar is available in two sizes:

1. 1.84 ounce standard bar at suggested retail value of $1.11
2. 3.1 ounce king size bar at suggested retail value of $1.66

==== Nutrition ====
Chocolatey Payday
Nutritional value per 100 g (3.5 oz)
- Energy: 2,092 kJ (500 kcal)
- Carbohydrates: 55.8 g
- Sugars: 51.9 g
- Fat: 26.9 g
- Saturated: 9.6 g
- Trans: 0 g
- Protein: 9.6 g
Vitamins and minerals
Minerals	Quantity %DV^{†}
Calcium	7% 96.1 mg
Iron	12% 2.1 mg
Potassium	10% 307.7 mg
Sodium	8% 192.3 mg
- Other constituents: Quantity
- Cholesterol: 0 mg
- Serving size is 1 1.85oz (or 52 g) bar
- ^{†}Percentages estimated using US recommendations for adults, except for potassium, which is estimated based on expert recommendation from the National Academies. Source: Smart Label

==== Ingredients ====
Sugar, peanuts, vegetable oil, palm oil, shea oil, sunflower oil, palm kernel oil, safflower oil, corn syrup, chocolate, skim milk. Contains 2% or less of: whey, salt, lecithin, carrageenan, mono- and diglycerides, vanillin (artificial flavor).

===== Allergens =====
Chocolatey Payday contains VersiLac milk, peanuts and soy.

===== Features and certifications =====
- Country of manufacture: US
- OU-D
