= Hollywood District =

Hollywood District may refer to:

- Hollywood, Portland, Oregon, a neighborhood of Portland, Oregon
- Hollywood Historic District (Homewood, Alabama)
- Hollywood, Los Angeles, California, a neighborhood
- Hollywood Boulevard Commercial and Entertainment District, Los Angeles, California
- Hollywood Boulevard Historic Business District, Hollywood, Florida

== See also ==
- Hollywood (disambiguation)
- Hollywood Terrace Historic District, a district listed on the National Register of Historic Places listings in Fayette County, Kentucky
- Little Hollywood Historic District, Hartford, Connecticut
