= Holly Wood =

Holly Wood or holly wood may refer to:

- Holly Wood, Oxfordshire, England, a Site of Special Scientific Interest
- Holly Wood, Sandwell, England, in the List of local nature reserves in England
- Holly wood, wood from a holly plant
- Holly Wood, a character in the game Final Fight

== See also ==
- Holli Would, a fictional character in the film Cool World
- Holly Woods (born 1953), American rock singer
- Holly Woodlawn (1946–2015), actress
- Holy Wood (disambiguation)
- Hollywood (disambiguation)
