= Wii =

Home video game console by Nintendo

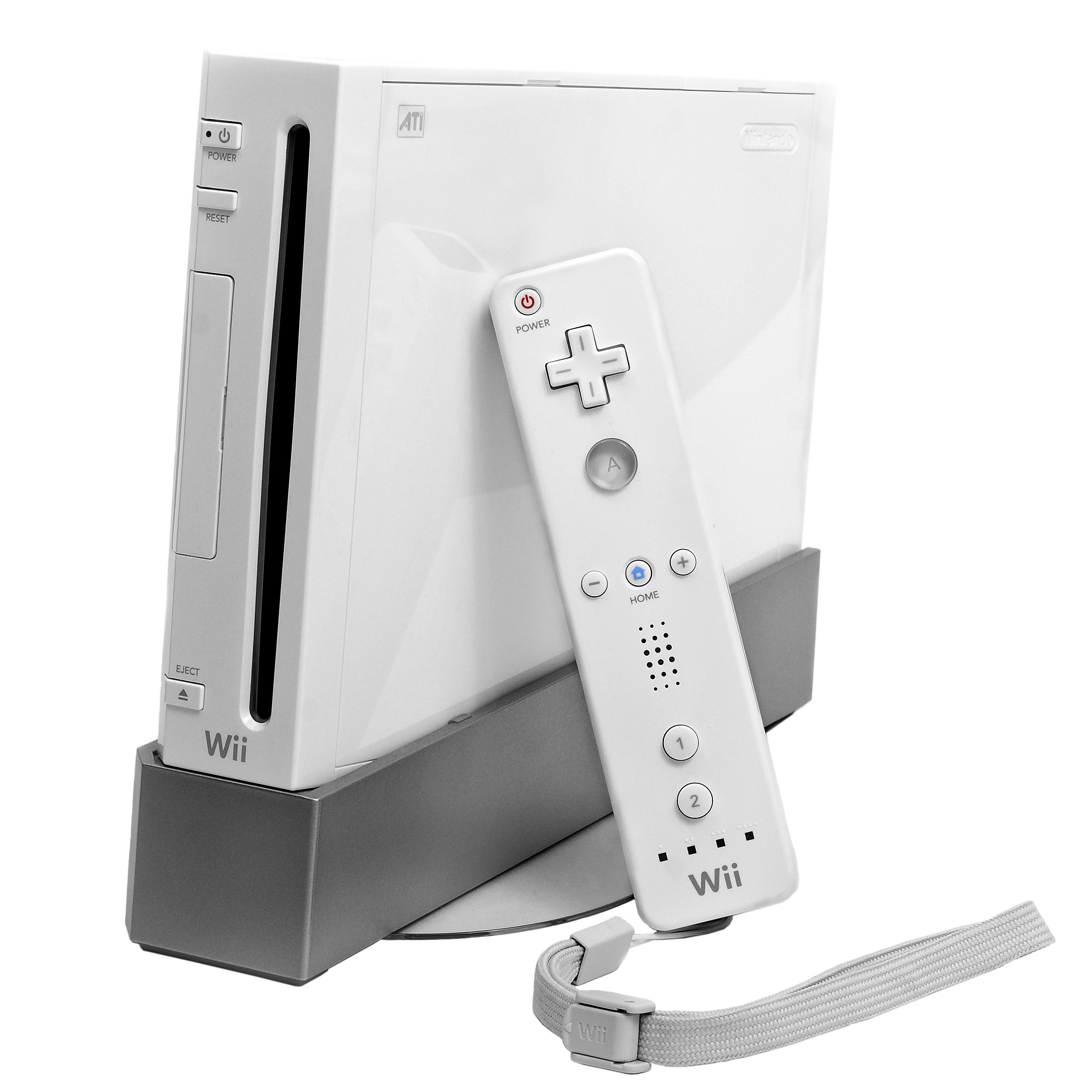
- Original white Wii standing upright on its stand next to an original Wii Remote
- Codename: Revolution (RVL)
- Developer: Nintendo IRD
- Manufacturer: Foxconn
- Type: Home video game console
- Generation: Seventh
- Released: NA: November 19, 2006; JP: December 2, 2006; AU: December 7, 2006; EU: December 8, 2006; ZA: September 30, 2007; KR: April 26, 2008; TW: July 12, 2008; IND: September 30, 2008; HK: December 12, 2009; Revisions; RVL-101; NA: October 23, 2011; EU: November 4, 2011; AU: November 11, 2011; Wii Mini; CAN: December 7, 2012; EU: March 22, 2013; USA: November 17, 2013
- Introductory price: US$249.99 (equivalent to $400 in 2025); €249.99 (equivalent to €360 in 2023); ¥25,000 (equivalent to ¥28,400 in 2024)
- Discontinued: AU: November 2011; JP: October 20, 2013; EU: October 24, 2013; Revisions; RVL-101; EU: October 24, 2013
- Units shipped: 101.63 million (details)
- Media: Wii optical disc; GameCube game disc (Note: Only compatible with the original Wii model); Digital distribution (Note: Compatible with all Wii models except the Wii Mini)
- Operating system: Wii system software
- CPU: IBM Broadway @ 729 MHz
- Memory: 24 MB 1T-SRAM + 64 MB GDDR3 SDRAM
- Storage: 512 MB flash memory
- Removable storage: SD card; GameCube Memory Card
- Display: Video output formats: Composite video (480i, 576i (PAL)); S-Video (480i (NTSC consoles only)); RGB SCART (576i (PAL consoles only)); Component video (YP_{B}P_{R}) (480i, 576i (PAL), 480p)
- Graphics: ATI Hollywood @ 243 MHz
- Controller input: Wii Remote (Plus); GameCube controller; Nintendo DS; Wii Balance Board
- Connectivity: Wi-Fi (802.11b/g); Bluetooth 2.0; 2 × USB 2.0
- Online services: Nintendo Wi-Fi Connection (Note: The Nintendo Wi-Fi Connection service was closed on May 20, 2014.); WiiConnect24 (Note: The WiiConnect24 service was closed on June 27, 2013.); Wii Shop Channel (Note: The Wii Shop Channel service was closed on January 30, 2019.)
- Dimensions: Width: 157 mm (6.2 in); Height: 60 mm (2.4 in); Depth: 197 mm (7.8 in); Revisions; RVL-101; Same; Mini; Width: 160 mm (6.3 in); Height: 46 mm (1.8 in); Depth: 193 mm (7.6 in)
- Weight: 1,220 g (43 oz); Revisions; RVL-101 1,130 g (40 oz); Mini 724 g (25.5 oz)
- Best-selling game: Pack-in: (Note: Except in Japan and South Korea) Wii Sports (82.9 million); Stand-alone: Mario Kart Wii (37.3 million) (list)
- Backward compatibility: GameCube
- Predecessor: GameCube
- Successor: Wii U
- Website: wii.com

The Wii (Note: Unlike most of Nintendo's consoles, the Wii is not named as the "Nintendo Wii" but simply "Wii"; this is also true of the Wii U.) (/wiː/ WEE) is a home video game console developed and marketed by Nintendo. It was released on November 19, 2006, in North America, and in December 2006 for most other regions of the world. It is Nintendo's fifth major home game console, following the GameCube, and is a seventh-generation console alongside Microsoft's Xbox 360 and Sony's PlayStation 3.

The Nintendo president, Satoru Iwata, focused on appealing to a broader audience through innovative gameplay, rather than competing with Microsoft and Sony on raw computational power. Shigeru Miyamoto and Genyo Takeda led development, which was initially codenamed Revolution. The Wii emphasized new forms of interaction, particularly through its wireless controller, the Wii Remote, which featured motion-tracking controls and could recognize gestures and function as a pointing device. The Wii was Nintendo's first console with native Internet connectivity, enabling online gaming and digital distribution via the Wii Shop Channel. It also supported wireless connectivity with the handheld Nintendo DS console for select games. Early models were backward-compatible with GameCube games and accessories. Nintendo later released cheaper versions: the RVL-101, without GameCube compatibility, and the Wii Mini, which removed features such as online connectivity and SD card storage.

Because of Nintendo's reduced focus on computational power, the Wii and its games were less expensive to produce than those of its competitors. It was extremely popular at launch, and was in short supply in some markets. Wii Sports, a pack-in game, became the Wii's killer app while new entries in the Super Mario, Legend of Zelda, Pokémon, and Metroid series helped boost its popularity. Within a year, the Wii became the best-selling console of the seventh generation and a social phenomenon in many countries. Total lifetime sales of the Wii reached over 101 million units. As of April 2026, it is the seventh-best-selling console of all time, and Nintendo's second best-selling home console after the Nintendo Switch surpassed it in 2021. (Note: Although the Nintendo Switch is a hybrid game console, Nintendo refers to it as "a home video game system that can also be used as a handheld", making the Wii Nintendo's second-best-selling home console.) The Wii was discontinued in October 2013, though the Wii Mini continued production for a few years, and some of its third party online services persisted until 2019.

The Wii repositioned Nintendo as a key player in the video game console marketplace, achieving Nintendo's goal of attracting a broader audience to video game consoles. The popularity of its motion-controlled games led Microsoft and Sony to develop the Kinect and PlayStation Move. However, the Wii's emphasis on casual-based experiences alienated core gamers. The Wii's successor, the Wii U, released in 2012, attempted to recapture that demographic but became a commercial failure and Nintendo's worst-selling home console.

== History ==
=== 2001–2003: Development ===
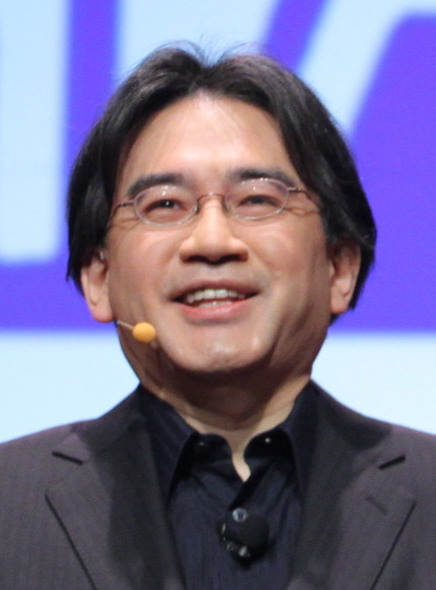
Nintendo's president Satoru Iwata directed the company to design the Wii to appeal to a broader range of players.

Shortly after the release of the GameCube, Nintendo began conceptual development on its next console. According to game designer Shigeru Miyamoto, the company decided early to not aim to compete on hardware power, instead prioritizing new gameplay experiences. The project was initially referred to by the placeholder name "GameCube Next" (GCNext or GCN). Nintendo originally envisioned pricing the console at around US$100 (equivalent to $180 in 2025).

On September 24, 2001, Nintendo began collaborating with Gyration Inc., a company that held several patents in motion-sensing technology, to prototype motion-based input devices using Gyration's patents.

After succeeding Hiroshi Yamauchi as Nintendo president in May 2002, Satoru Iwata acknowledged that the company had fallen behind industry trends, particularly in online gaming. He also wanted Nintendo to develop hardware and video games that would appeal to all demographics. Internal market research revealed that Nintendo's prior focus on unconventional hardware had made its platforms more difficult for third-party developers to support, weakening its competitive position. One of Iwata's first major initiatives in response was the development of the Nintendo DS, a dual-screen handheld console with a touchscreen, to revitalize their handheld console line.

In 2003, Iwata met with Miyamoto and Genyo Takeda to discuss the company's market strategy. He directed Takeda to "go off the tech roadmap" in designing the new console, emphasizing that it needed to be accessible, especially to non-traditional audiences, including mothers. He also wanted backward compatibility with earlier Nintendo games to reduce household clutter. Takeda led hardware development, while Miyamoto focused on designing a new controller, leveraging Gyration's motion-sensing technology. Iwata proposed using motion controls as a means to simplify the gaming interface and expand its appeal. An initial prototype was completed within six months.

The Nintendo DS was said to have influenced the design of the new console. Nintendo observed that the DS's novel dual-screen interface had attracted non-traditional players and aimed to replicate that success on their home console platform. Designer Ken'ichiro Ashida recalled, "We had the DS on our minds as we worked on the Wii. We thought about copying the DS's touch-panel interface and even came up with a prototype." The idea was ultimately abandoned to avoid redundancy between the two systems. Miyamoto later remarked, "If the DS had flopped, we might have taken the Wii back to the drawing board."

=== 2004–2005: Announcements ===
At E3 2004, Iwata first unveiled some details of the project under its new codename, "Revolution," a reflection of his belief the console would revolutionize the gaming industry. BBC News' technology editor Alfred Hermida wrote that Nintendo's struggle to match Sony and Microsoft in the home console market made success crucial.

The console, still named "Revolution", was formally presented to the public at E3 in May 2005. At this time, the console's motion controller was not yet finalized and was omitted from the unveiling. Iwata held the console above him with one hand to emphasize its size relative to its rivals. The reduced form factor meant lower power consumption and less heat output, and was also designed to appeal to parents, who were thought to be more likely to allow the device into the living room if it was small and attractive. The console's minimalist aesthetic invited comparisons to Apple's original iPod. Iwata reportedly used a stack of three DVD cases as a reference for the final size. The prototype shown was black, though the final retail version, released the following year, was only available in white.

In September 2005, Iwata demonstrated a prototype of the controller at the Tokyo Game Show. By this stage, the hardware closely resembled the final Wii Remote and Nunchuk. During the presentation, Iwata demonstrated the controller's motion-sensing capabilities, supported a video with commentary from developers such as Hideo Kojima and Yuji Horii, who had tested the controller and believed people would be drawn in by it.

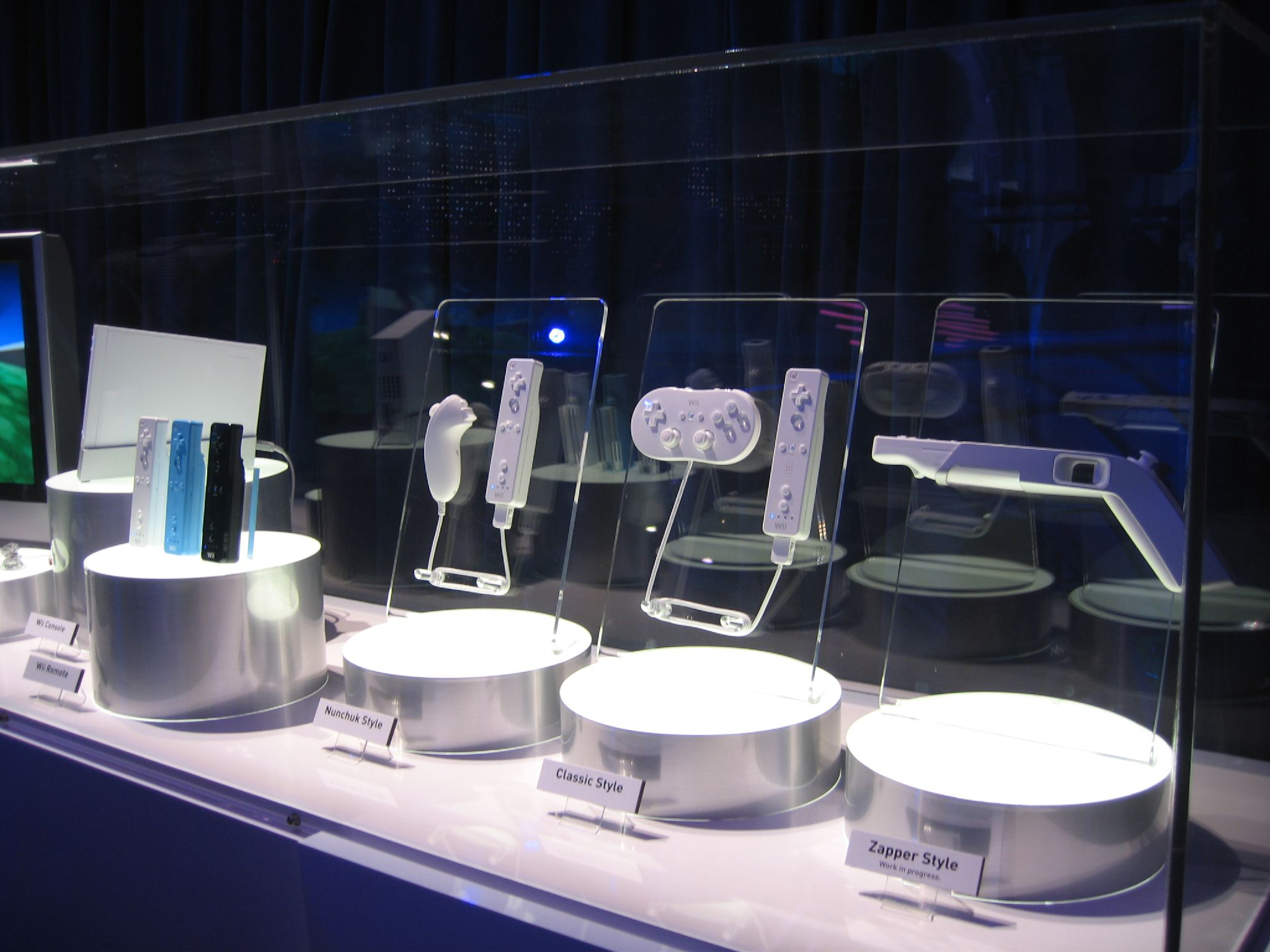
The Wii and several peripherals on display at E3 2006

The console's official name, "Wii," was announced in April, a month ahead of E3 2006. The stylized spelling—with two lowercase "i"s—was designed to represent both two people standing side by side and the pairing of the Wii Remote and Nunchuk. In its announcement, Nintendo explained: "Wii sounds like 'we', which emphasizes that the console is for everyone. Wii can easily be remembered by people around the world, no matter what language they speak. No confusion."

The name drew widespread mockery and criticism. Forbes reported that Nintendo fans feared the name would perpetuate the perception that Nintendo made consoles primarily for children. BBC News reported the day after the name was announced that "a long list of puerile jokes, based on the name," had appeared on the Internet. Some video game developers and journalists expressed a preference for the codename "Revolution." President of Nintendo of America Reggie Fils-Aimé defended the name, saying that the company chose the name over "Revolution" because they wanted something short, distinctive, and easily pronounceable in all cultures.

The Wii was made available for press demonstrations at E3 2006, where Nintendo also revealed several planned launch games. At the same event, the company reaffirmed its intention to release the console by the end of 2006.

=== 2006–2010: Launch ===
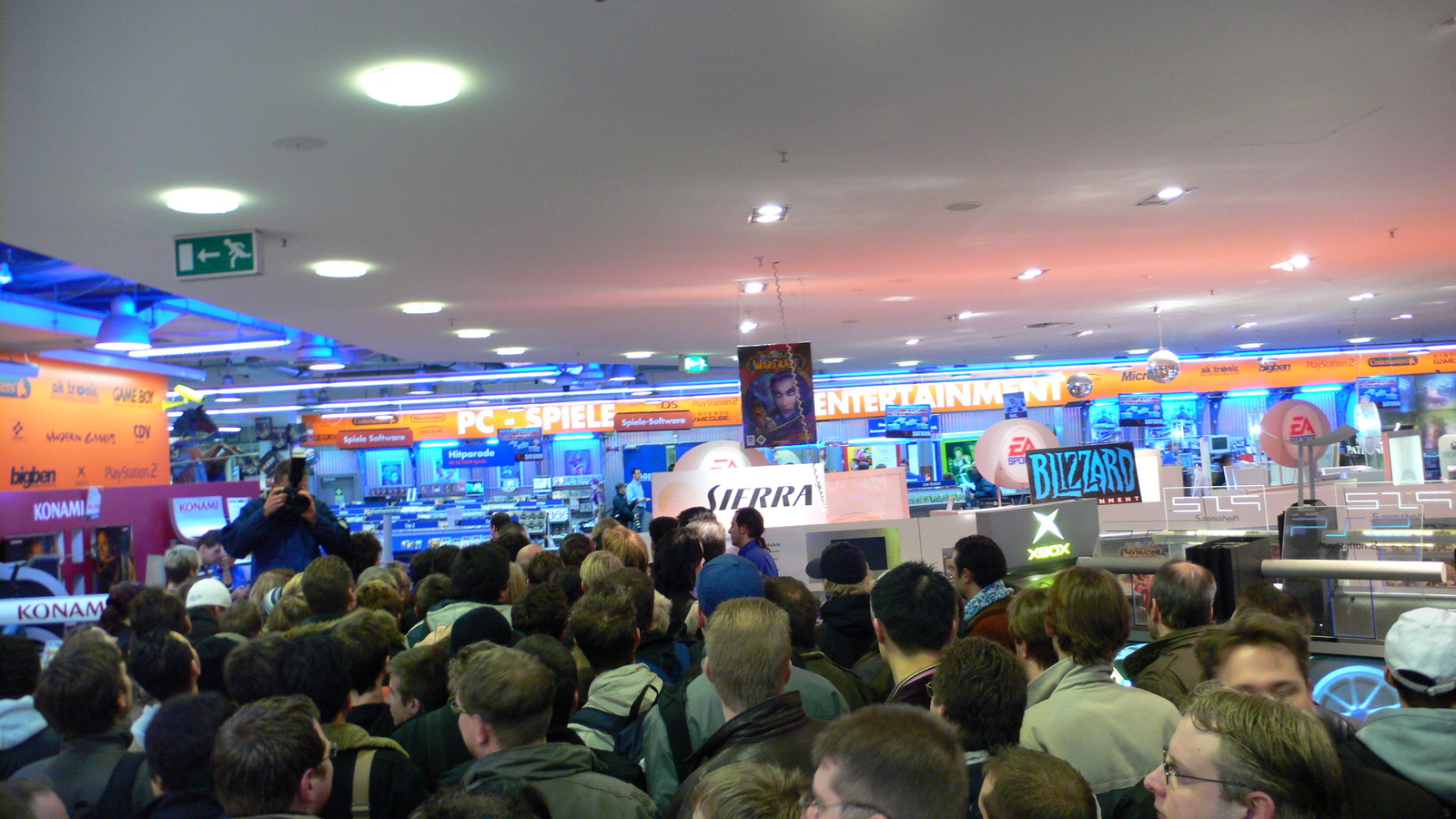
Crowds gather in Hamburg to buy a Wii on launch day.

Nintendo announced the launch plans and pricing for the Wii in September 2006. The console first launched in the United States on November 19, 2006, priced at US$249.99 (equivalent to $399.25 in 2025). Other regional release dates and prices included Japan on December 2, priced at ¥25,000 (equivalent to ¥28,401 in 2024), followed by Australasia on December 7 at A$399.95 (equivalent to $592.54 in 2022), and later, the United Kingdom on December 8 for £179.99 (equivalent to £311.06 in 2025), with most of Europe receiving it at €249.99. Nintendo aimed to have around 30 Wii games available by the end of 2006 and anticipated shipping over 4 million consoles by the year's end.

As part of its launch campaign, Nintendo promoted the Wii in North America through a series of television advertisements directed by Academy Award winner Stephen Gaghan. The internet ads campaign featured slogans like "Wii would like to play" and "Experience a new way to play". Launched in November 2006, the campaign had a budget exceeding $200 million for the year.

These ads targeted a broader demographic compared to other consoles, inviting parents and grandparents to experience the Wii. Nintendo's goal was to appeal to a wider audience than its competitors in the seventh generation. In December 2006, Iwata stated that Nintendo didn't view itself as "fighting Sony," but instead focused on how to expand the gaming demographic. This strategy proved successful as the Wii became a global social phenomenon throughout 2007.

The Wii's launch in other regions took several years. It arrived in South Africa on September 30, 2007, South Korea on April 26, 2008, Taiwan on July 12, 2008, and Hong Kong on December 12, 2009.. In India, it was distributed from September 30, 2008 through partnership between Samurai Electronics and HCL Infosystems. Nintendo had planned to work with its localization partner, iQue, to release the Wii in China in 2008, but was unable to meet the requirements to circumvent the ban on foreign-made consoles imposed by the Chinese government.

=== 2011–2014: Successor and discontinuation ===
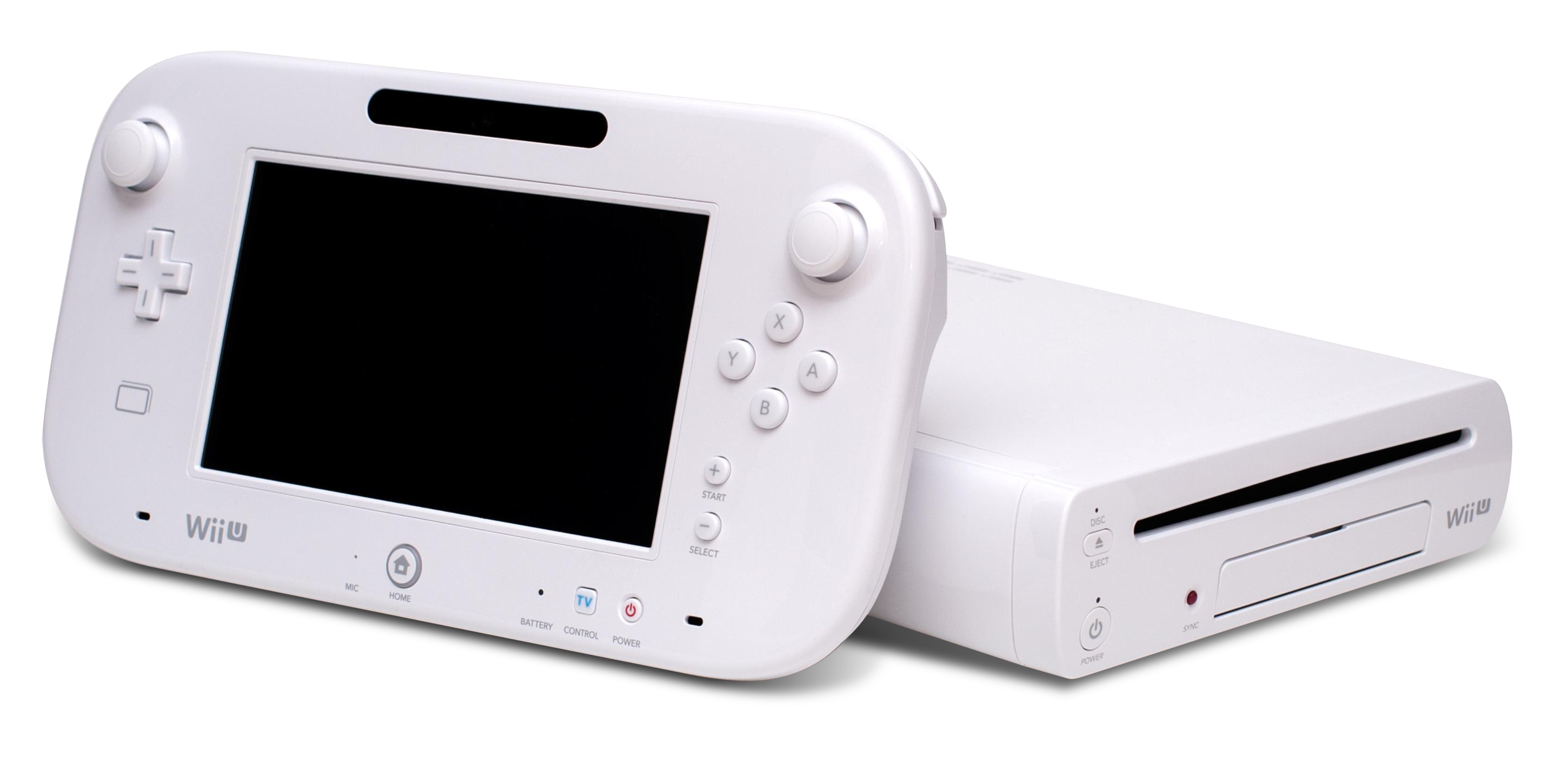
The Wii U, with its Wii U GamePad in front

Nintendo announced the successor to the Wii, the Wii U, at E3 2011. Nintendo had recognized that the Wii had generally been shunned by the core gaming audience as it was perceived more as a casual gaming experience. The Wii U was aimed to draw the core audience back in with more advanced features atop the basic Wii technology. The Wii U features the Wii U GamePad, a controller with an embedded touchscreen, alongside output 1080p high-definition graphics. The Wii U GamePad serves as a secondary screen alongside the television. The Wii U is fully backward-compatible with Wii games and peripherals for the Wii, including the Wii Remote, Nunchuk controller and Wii Balance Board, and select Wii U games including support for these devices. The Wii U was first released on November 18, 2012 in North America; November 30, 2012 in Europe and Australia, and December 8, 2012 in Japan.

Nintendo continued to sell the revised Wii model and the Wii Mini alongside the Wii U during the Wii U's first release year. During 2013, Nintendo began to sunset certain Wii online functions as they pushed consumers towards the Wii U as a replacement system or towards the offline Wii Mini, though the Wii Shop Channel remained available. Nintendo discontinued production of the Wii in October 2013 after selling over 100 million units worldwide, though the company continued to produce the Wii Mini unit primarily for the North American market. The WiiConnect24 service and several channels based on that service were shuttered in June 2013. Support for online multiplayer games via the Nintendo Wi-Fi Connection were discontinued in May 2014, while the Wii Shop was closed in January 2019, effectively ending its online services. The Wii Mini continued to be manufactured for some time after.

Despite the Wii's discontinuation, some developers continued to produce Wii games. Ubisoft released Just Dance games for the Wii up to Just Dance 2020 (2019). Vblank Entertainment's Shakedown: Hawaii along with Retro City Rampage DX are the most recent Wii games, which were released on July 9, 2020, more than 13 years after the Wii's launch. On January 27, 2020, Nintendo announced that from February 6 it will no longer repair Wii consoles due to a scarcity of spare parts. (Note: The original end of support date was March 31, 2020; but due to the repair request demand exceeding what Nintendo had forecast, the company was forced to stop accepting repairs more than one month earlier.)

== Hardware ==
=== Console ===
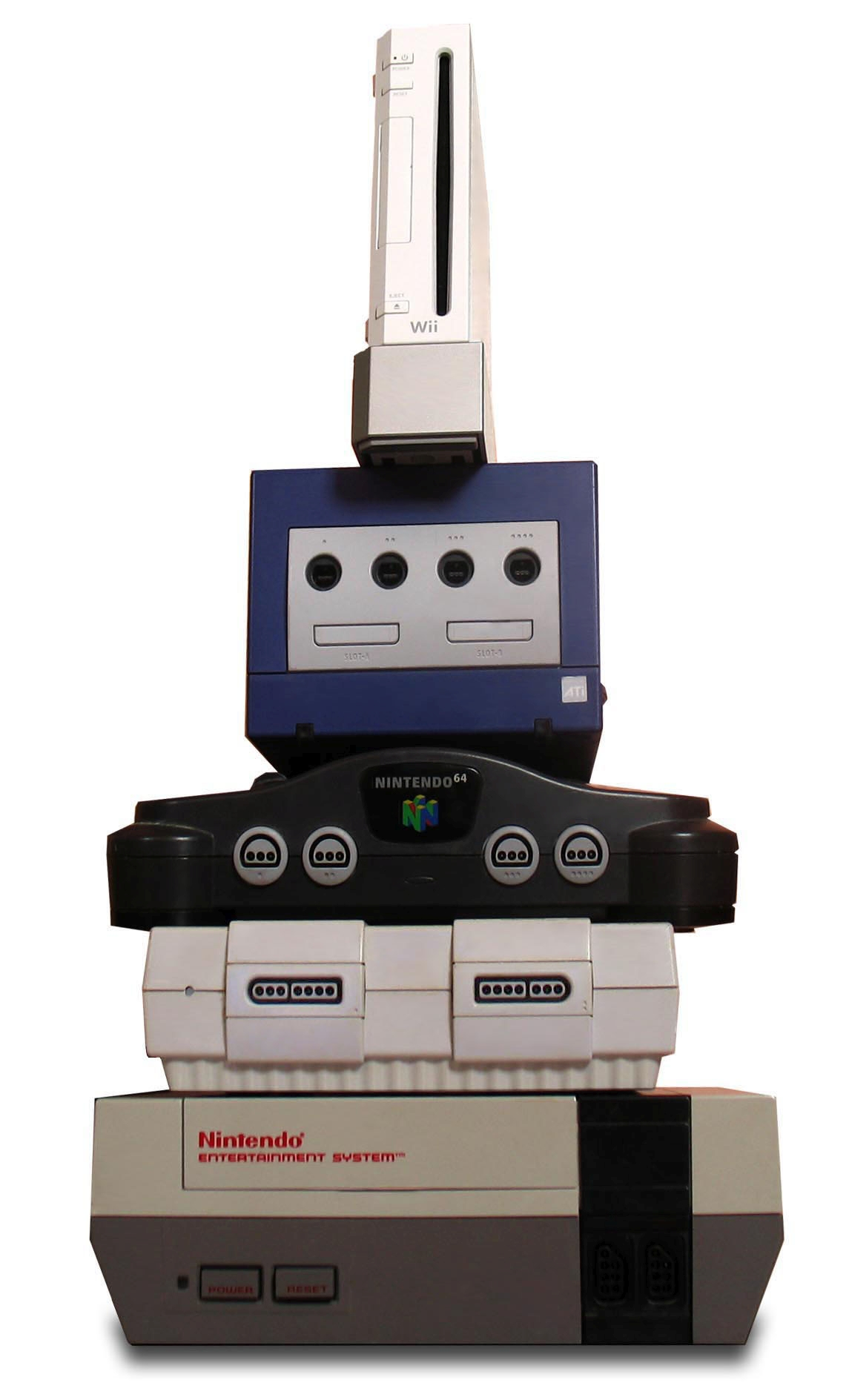
The Wii (top) compared in size to the GameCube, Nintendo 64, North American Super NES, and NES

Nintendo chose not to outpace the performance of rival consoles. Unlike their previous consoles, they built the Wii from commercial off-the-shelf hardware rather than developing customized components. This significantly reduced manufacturing costs, allowing Nintendo to offer the console at a lower price. As Miyamoto explained, "Originally, I wanted a machine that would cost $100. My idea was to spend nothing on the console technology so all the money could be spent on improving the interface and software."

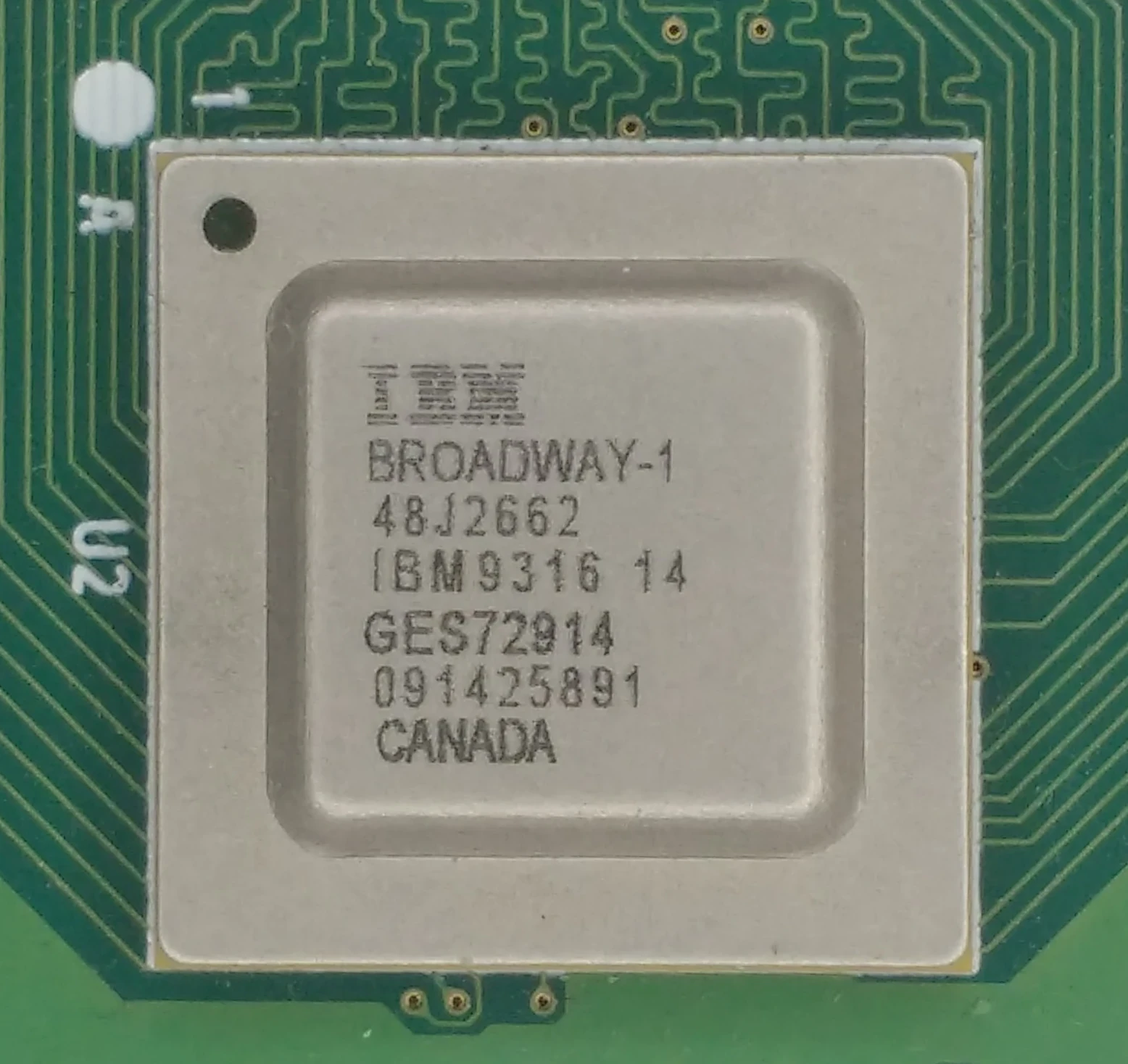
Broadway CPU

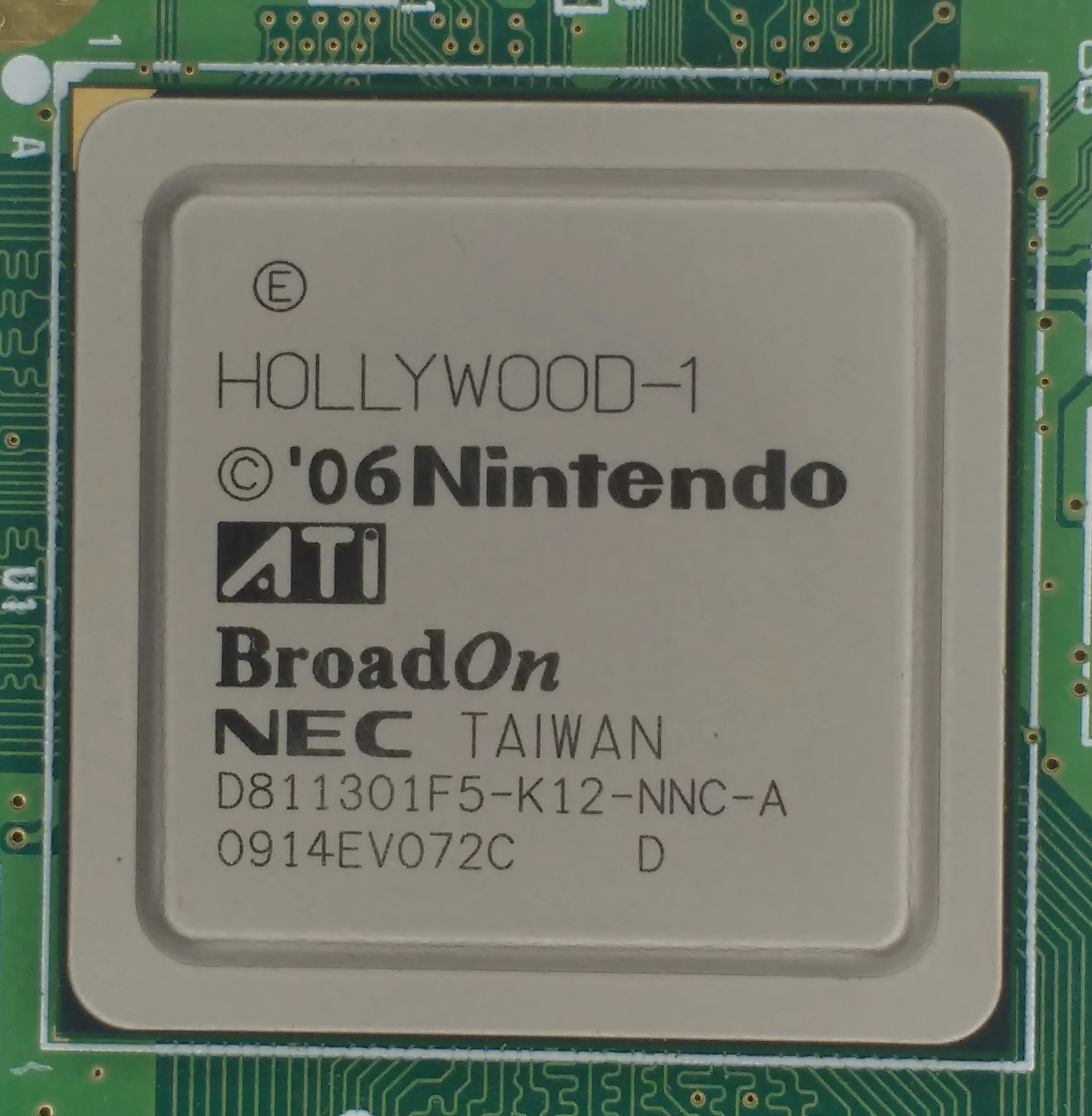
Hollywood SoC

The Wii's central processing unit, named Broadway, is a 32-bit chip developed by IBM. Based on the same PowerPC architecture as the GameCube's Gekko processor, it runs at 729 MHz and was manufactured using a more efficient 90 nm process, reducing power consumption by about 20% compared to Gekko's 180 nm process. Other system functions are handled by Hollywood, a system-on-a-chip (SoC) developed by ATI that combines graphics, audio, and input/output functions. Its graphics processing unit (GPU) is an updated version of the GameCube's Flipper, running at 243 MHz, 1.5 times faster, allowing it to support more advanced visual effects and including 3 MB of embedded texture memory. It also contains Starlet, an ARM-based coprocessor with 96 KB of RAM that manages input/output operations and system security. Hollywood integrates 24 MB of high-speed 1T-SRAM that works alongside 64 MB of GDDR3 memory mounted on the motherboard, bringing the total system memory to 88 MB. In terms of computational power, the Wii was about 1.5 to 2 times more powerful than the GameCube, but was the least powerful of the major home consoles of its generation.

The Wii's motherboard has a WiFi module, supporting 802.11b and 802.11g modes, and a Bluetooth module to communicate with its controllers. A USB-based LAN adapter can connect the Wii to a wired Ethernet network.

Games are read via a front slot-loading optical drive compatible with Nintendo's proprietary 12 cm Wii discs and 8 cm GameCube discs. However, it does not support standard optical media such as DVDs or CDs. Although Nintendo had planned on incorporating this feature into later revisions of the Wii, the demand for the console meant a delay in their schedule, until the feature lost interest. Nintendo later explained that they felt that most consumers owned other devices with DVD playback capability, and it allowed them to avoid the additional cost associated with licensing patents for the technology. The optical drive slot is illuminated with LEDs that indicate system activity, for example, pulsing blue when receiving messages via WiiConnect24 or during disc reading.

The system includes 512 MB of internal flash memory for storing saved data and downloaded content. This storage could be expanded via SD cards inserted into a slot behind a front panel. A later system update enabled users to launch Wii channels and play Virtual Console and WiiWare games directly from SD cards.

The rear of the console houses video output and power connectors, along with two USB ports. When oriented vertically, the top panel reveals four GameCube controller ports and two GameCube memory card slots.

At launch, the Wii was Nintendo's smallest home console. Measuring 44 millimeters (1.73 inches) wide, 157 mm (6.18 in) tall, and 215.4 mm (8.48 in) deep in its vertical orientation, the system was slightly larger than three DVD cases stacked together. The console was designed to operate either horizontally or vertically. Its included stand, used for stability in vertical placement, measures 55.4 mm (2.18 in) wide, 44 mm (1.73 in) tall, and 225.6 mm (8.88 in) deep. Weighing 1.2 kilograms (2.65 pounds), the Wii was the lightest of the three major seventh-generation consoles.

=== Wii Remote ===
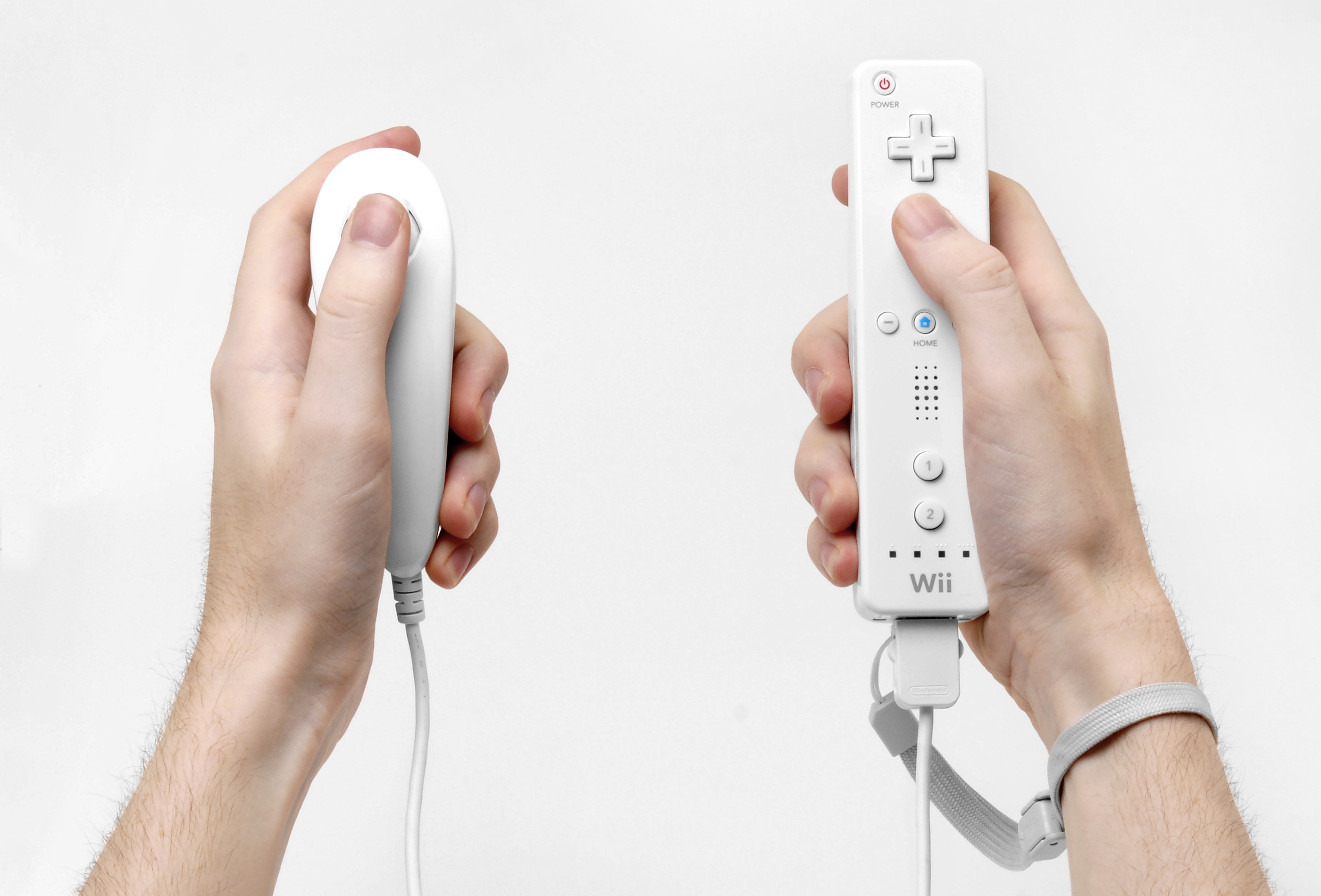
A Nunchuk, Wii Remote and strap

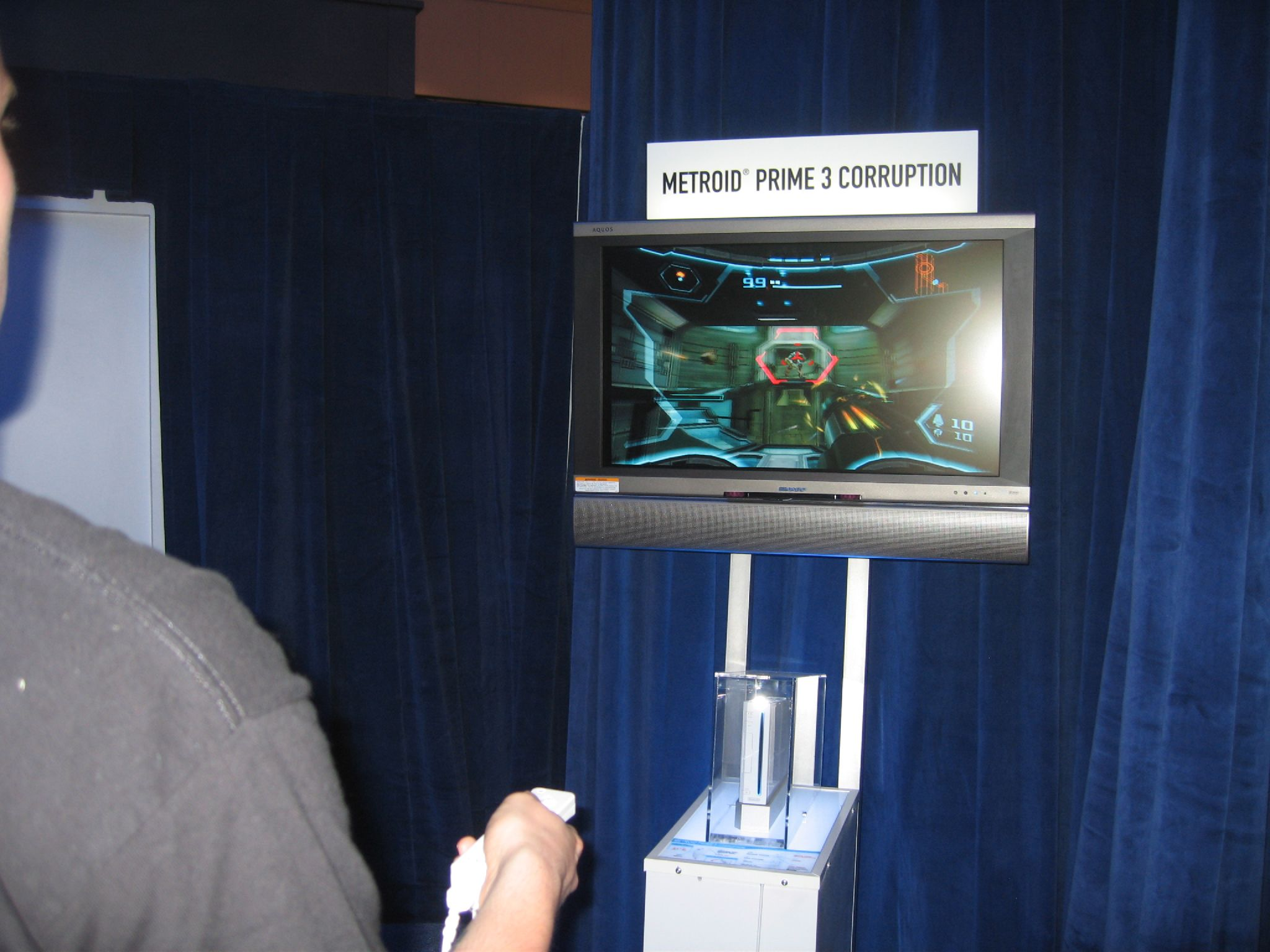
The Wii Remote being used to play Metroid Prime 3 at E3 2006. The Sensor Bar can be seen at the base of the television screen.

The Wii Remote (Note: "Wii Remote" is the official name of the device though the nickname "Wiimote" has been used by the general population.) is the primary controller for the console. The remote contains a MEMS-based three-dimension accelerometer, along with infrared detection sensors located at the far end of the controller. The accelerometers allow the Wii Remote to recognize its orientation after being moved from a resting position, translating that motion into gesture recognition for a game. For example, the pack-in game Wii Sports includes a ten-pin bowling game that has the player hold the Wii Remote and deliver a ball; the Wii Remote can account for the player's position relative to the Sensor Bar, and their arm and wrist rotation to apply speed and spin to the virtual ball's delivery on screen. The infrared detectors are used to track emissions from LEDs in the included Sensor Bar, which is placed above or below the television display, as to track the relative orientation of the Wii Remote towards the screen. This allows the Wii Remote to act as a pointing device like a computer mouse on the television screen, with an approximate range of 15 feet (4.6 m) for accurate detection.

The Wii Remote features traditional controller inputs, including a directional pad, three face action buttons, a shoulder trigger, and four system-related buttons including a power switch. The Wii Remote connects to the Wii via Bluetooth with an approximate 30 feet (9.1 m) range, communicating the sensor and control information to the console unit. The Wii Remote includes an internal speaker and a rumble pack that can be triggered by a game to provide feedback directly to the player's hand. Up to four Wii Remotes could connect wirelessly to a Wii, with LED lights on each remote indicating which controller number the Remote had connected as. The remote is battery-operated, and when the Remote is not powered on, these LED lights can display the remaining battery power.

A wrist-mounted strap is included with the Wii Remote, with one end affixed to the bottom of the unit. Nintendo strongly encouraged players to use the strap in case the Wii Remote accidentally slipped out of their hands. Nintendo recalled the original straps in December 2006 and provided a free, stronger strap as a replacement, as well as packaging the new strap in future bundles after the company faced legal challenges from users that reported damage to their homes from the Wii Remote slipping from their hands while playing. In October 2007, Nintendo also added a silicone Wii Remote Jacket to shipments of the Wii and Wii Remote, as well as a free offering for existing users. The Jacket wraps around the bulk of the remote but leaves access to the various buttons and connectors, providing a stickier surface in the user's grip to further reduce the chance of the Remote falling out of the player's hand.

Accessories can be connected to a Wii Remote through a proprietary port at the base of the controller. The Wii shipped with the bundled Nunchuk—a handheld unit with an accelerometer, analog stick, and two trigger buttons—which connected to this port on the Wii Remote via a cable 4 feet (1.2 m) in length. Players hold both the Wii Remote and Nunchuk in separate hands to control supported games.

The Wii MotionPlus accessory plugs into the port at the base of the Wii Remote and augments the existing sensors with gyroscopes to allow for finer motion detection. The MotionPlus accessory was released in June 2009 with a number of new games directly supporting this new functionality, including Wii Sports Resort which included the accessory as part of a bundle. The MotionPlus functionality was later incorporated into a revision of the controller called the Wii Remote Plus, first released in October 2010. A number of third-party controller manufacturers developed their own lower-cost versions of the Wii Remote, though these generally were less accurate or lacked the sensitivity that Nintendo's unit had.

=== Other controllers and accessories ===
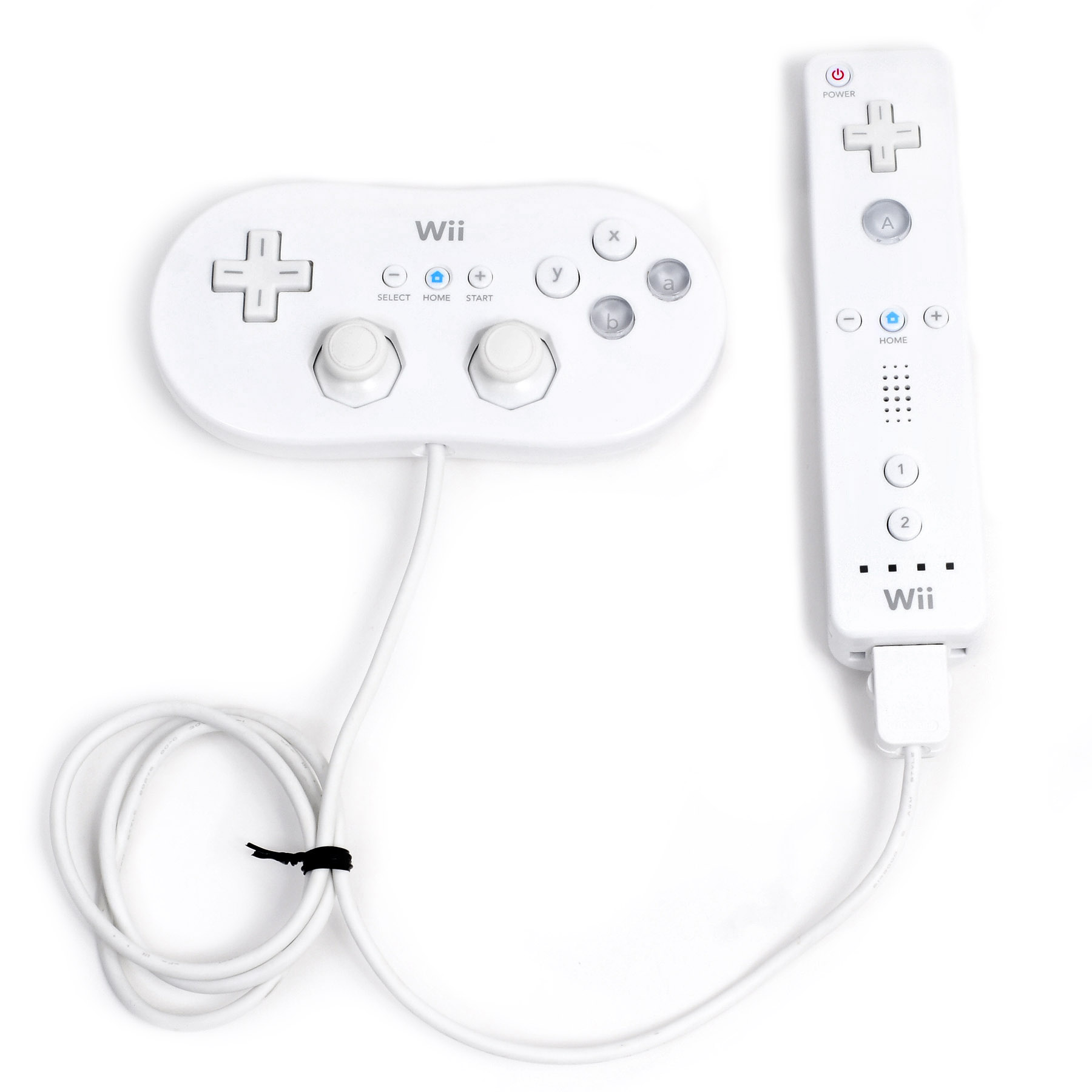
The original Classic Controller connected to the Wii Remote

The Classic Controller is an extension for the Wii Remote, released alongside the Wii in November 2006. Its form factor is similar to classic gamepads such as that for the Super Nintendo Entertainment System, with a d-pad, four face buttons, Start and Select buttons alongside the Wii connection button, and two shoulder buttons. Additionally, Nintendo included inputs present in modern controllers, like 2 analog sticks and pressure sensitive shoulder buttons. Players can use it with older games from the Virtual Console in addition to games designed for the Wii. In 2009, Nintendo released the Wii Classic Controller Pro, which was modelled after the GameCube and PlayStation 2 controllers form factor and amongst other additions, adds grips on the bottom of the controller and rearranges the placement of the shoulder buttons. However, unlike the GameCube and original Classic Controller, the Classic Controller Pro does not have pressure sensitive shoulder buttons.

The Wii Balance Board was released alongside Wii Fit in December 2007. It is a wireless balance board accessory for the Wii, with multiple pressure sensors used to measure the user's center of balance. Wii Fit offers a number of different exercise modes which monitored the player's position on the board, as well as exercise gamification, as to encourage players to exercise daily. In addition to use in Nintendo's Wii Fit Plus that expanded the range of exercises using the Wii Balance Board, the accessory can be used in other third-party games that translated the player's balance on the unit into in-game controls such as Shaun White Snowboarding and Skate It. Namco Bandai produced a mat controller (a simpler, less-sophisticated competitor to the Balance Board).

One of Iwata's initiatives at Nintendo was focused on "quality of life" products, those that encouraged players to do other activities beyond simply sitting and playing video games as to promote physical wellbeing. The use of motion controls in the Wii served part of this, but Nintendo developed additional accessories to give awareness of one's health as a lead-in for the company to break into the healthcare field. At E3 2009, Nintendo had presented a "Vitality Sensor" accessory that would be used to measure a player's pulse as a lead-in to a larger quality of life initiative, but this product was never released. In a 2013 Q&A, Satoru Iwata revealed that the Vitality Sensor had been shelved, as internal testing found that the device did not work with all users, and its use cases were too narrow. Despite this, Nintendo has continued Iwata's quality of life program with further products on later consoles and games.

A number of first- and third-party accessories were developed that the Wii Remote could be slotted into and then used in a more physical manner that took advantage of the accelerometer and gyroscopic functions of the controller. Some copies of Mario Kart Wii shipped with the Wii Wheel, a plastic steering wheel frame with the Wii Remote could be inserted into, so that players could steer more effectively in game. Rhythm games that used plastic instruments, such as Guitar Hero III, shipped with instruments that the Wii Remote could be slotted into; the remote powered the various buttons on the controller and relayed that to the Wii.

=== Variants and bundles ===
The Wii launch bundle included the console; a stand to allow the console to be placed vertically; a plastic stabilizer for the main stand, one Wii Remote, a Nunchuk attachment for the Remote, a Sensor Bar and a removable stand for the bar to mount on a television set, an external power adapter, and two AA batteries for the Wii Remote. The bundle included a composite A/V cable with RCA connectors, and in appropriate regions such as in Europe, a SCART adapter was also included. A copy of the game Wii Sports was included in most regional bundles.

Although Nintendo showed the console and the Wii Remote in white, black, silver, lime-green and red before it was released, it was only available in white for its first two-and-a-half years of sales. Black consoles were available in Japan in August 2009, in Europe in November 2009 and in North America in May 2010. A red Wii system bundle was available in Japan on November 11, 2010, commemorating the 25th anniversary of Super Mario Bros. The European version of the limited-edition red Wii bundle was released on October 29, 2010, which includes the original Donkey Kong game pre-installed onto the console, New Super Mario Bros. Wii and Wii Sports. The red Wii bundle was released in North America on November 7, 2010, with New Super Mario Bros. Wii and Wii Sports. All of the red Wii system bundles feature the Wii Remote Plus, with integrated Wii MotionPlus technology.

=== Revisions ===
The prefix for the numbering scheme of the Wii system and its parts and accessories is "RVL-" for its codename, "Revolution". The base Wii console had a model number of RVL-001, for example.

==== Cost-reduced model ====
RVL-101 layout with its labels aligned horizontally, just as it was designed to be placed, unlike the original model

A cost-reduced variant of the Wii (model RVL-101) was released late into the platform's lifespan that removed the GameCube controller ports and memory card slots found on the original model. This means that this model is incompatible with GameCube games alongside the GameCube Controller for Wii games that support it. This model is often referred to as the "Wii Family Edition", the name given to the bundle when it was first sold in Europe. Additionally, it does not include a stand, as it is intended to be positioned horizontally. Nintendo announced the new revision in August 2011 as a replacement for the original Wii model which it was discontinuing in certain regions including Europe and the United States. The new unit in its bundles was priced at $149.99, a further reduction for the Wii's MSRP at the time of $199.99 established in September 2009.

The console was first released in North America on October 23, 2011, in a black finish, bundled with a black Wii Remote Plus and Nunchuk, along with New Super Mario Bros. Wii and a limited-edition soundtrack for Super Mario Galaxy. It was released in Europe on November 4, 2011, in a white finish, bundled with a white Wii Remote Plus and Nunchuk, along with Wii Party and Wii Sports. A special bundle featuring a blue version of the revised Wii model and Wii Remote Plus and Nunchuk with the inclusion of Mario & Sonic at the London 2012 Olympic Games was released in Europe on November 18, 2011, in collaboration with Sega. Nintendo later revised the North American bundle by replacing the prior pack-in game and soundtrack with the original Wii Sports duology; the new bundle was released on October 28, 2012.

==== Wii Mini ====
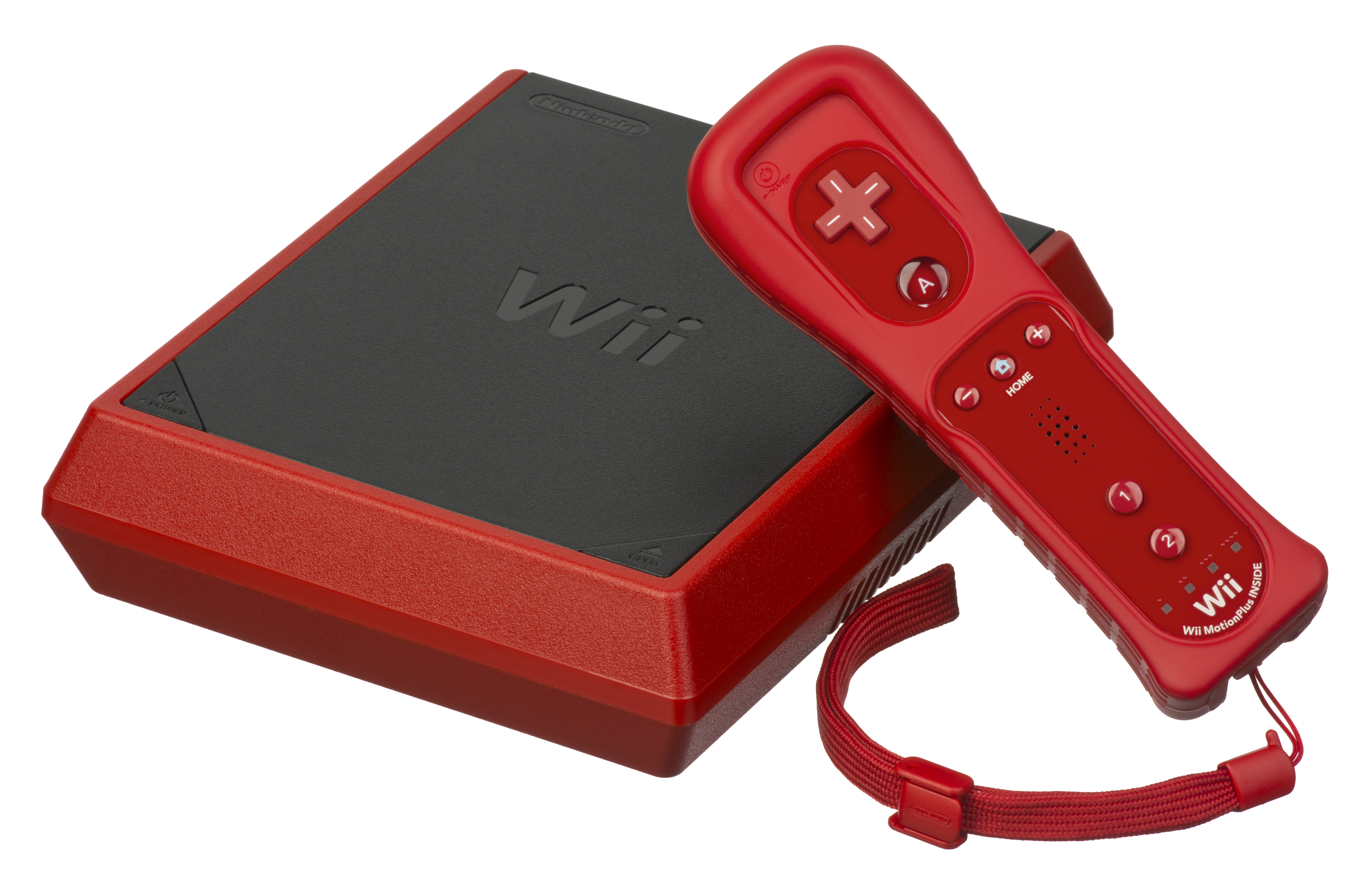
A Wii Mini with Wii Remote

The Wii Mini (model RVL-201) is a smaller, redesigned Wii with a top-loading disc drive. In addition to the lack of GameCube support, the Wii Mini removes Wi-Fi support and online connectivity, along with the removal of the SD card slot. It also removed support for 480p and component video output. According to Nintendo of Canada's Matt Ryan, they stripped these features to bring down the price of the console further as to make it an option for those consumers that had not yet gotten a Wii or for those who wanted a second Wii in a different location. Ryan stated that while removing the online functionality would prevent some games from being played, most Wii games could still be played without it. The Wii Mini is styled in matte black with a red border, and includes a red Wii Remote Plus and Nunchuk. According to Ryan, the red coloring was indicative of the planned exclusive release in Canada. A composite A/V cable, wired Sensor Bar and power adapter are also included.

The Wii Mini was first released on December 7, 2012, exclusively in Canada with a MSRP of CA$99.99. It was later released in Europe on March 22, 2013, and in the United States on November 17, 2013. The Canadian and European releases did not include a game, while Mario Kart Wii had been included in all launch bundles in the United States. Nintendo added several best-selling and critically acclaimed Wii games to its Nintendo Selects label and marketed those alongside the Wii Mini's release.

== Software ==
The console has many internal features made available from its hardware and firmware components. The hardware allows for extendability (via expansion ports), while the firmware (and some software) could receive periodic updates via the WiiConnect24 service.

=== Wii Menu ===
Wii Menu in 16:9 aspect ratio

The development of the Wii Menu, the main user interface for the Wii, was led by Takashi Aoyama of Nintendo's Integrated Research & Development Division. The project, named the "Console Feature Realization Project", was to figure out what the Wii interface could show running in a low-power mode on an around-the-clock schedule that would be of interest for people to look at if they were not playing games. The idea of having continually updated weather and news reports made logical sense from testing, and this led to the idea of presenting these similar to a row of televisions each set to a different television channel as if in an electronics shop, creating the "channels" concept. A user can navigate to any channel window to bring that to the forefront, whether to launch the game or application or to get more information that was being displayed. For example, the Forecast Channel would display a brief summary of the local area's temperature and short-term weather forecast, while clicking on the channel brought up an interactive globe that the user could manipulate with the Wii Remote to explore real-time weather conditions across the Earth.

The Wii launched with six channels: the Disc Channel which was used to launch Wii and GameCube games from an optical disc; the Mii Channel to create Mii avatars; the Photo Channel which could be used to view and edit photos stored on an SD card; the Wii Shop Channel to purchase new games and applications; the Forecast Channel and the News Channel. In addition to default channels that came with the Wii, new channels could be added through system updates, downloaded applications from the Wii Shop Channel, or added by games themselves. Shortly after launch, other free channels created by Nintendo were made available to users, including the Internet Channel, a modified version of the Opera web browser for the Wii which supports USB keyboard input and Adobe Flash Player.

The Wii Menu channels feature music composed by video game composer Kazumi Totaka.

=== Mii ===
Default Miis

The Mii Channel, the first application used to create and view Mii characters on the Wii

The Wii introduced the use of player-customized avatars called Miis, which have been continued to be used by Nintendo in the Wii U, the Nintendo 3DS family, and, to a lesser extent, the Nintendo Switch. Each player on a Wii console was encouraged to create their own Mii via the Mii Channel to be used in games like Wii Sports and some of the system software like the Mii Channel. For example, players would select their Mii in Wii Sports, creating their in-game avatar for the game. Miis could be shared with other players through the Mii Channel.

=== Nintendo DS connectivity ===
The Wii system supports wireless connectivity with the Nintendo DS without any additional accessories. This connectivity allows the player to use the Nintendo DS microphone and touchscreen as inputs for Wii games. The first game utilizing Nintendo DS-Wii connectivity is Pokémon Battle Revolution. Players with either the Pokémon Diamond or Pearl Nintendo DS games are able to play battles using the Nintendo DS as a controller. Final Fantasy Crystal Chronicles: Echoes of Time, released on both Nintendo DS and Wii, features connectivity in which both games can advance simultaneously. Nintendo later released the Nintendo Channel, which allows Wii owners to download game demos of popular games such as Mario Kart DS, or additional data to their Nintendo DS in a process similar to that of a DS Download Station. The console is also able to expand Nintendo DS games.

=== Online connectivity ===
The Wii console connects to the Internet through its built-in 802.11b/g Wi-Fi or through a USB-to-Ethernet adapter; either method allows players to access the Nintendo Wi-Fi Connection service. The service had several features for the console, including Virtual Console, WiiConnect24, the Internet Channel, the Forecast Channel, the Everybody Votes Channel, the News Channel and the Check Mii Out Channel. The Wii can also communicate (and connect) with other Wii systems through a self-generated wireless LAN, enabling local wireless multi-playing on different television sets. Battalion Wars 2 first demonstrated this feature for non-split screen multi-playing between two (or more) televisions.

=== Third-party applications ===
Third-party media apps were added to the Wii's online channels, typically offered as free downloads but requiring subscriber logins for paid services. Among some of these included the BBC iPlayer in November 2009, Netflix in November 2010, Hulu in February 2012, YouTube in December 2012, Amazon Prime Video in January 2013, and Crunchyroll in October 2015. In June 2017, YouTube ended support for its Wii channel. In January 2019, Nintendo ended support for all streaming services on the Wii.

=== Parental controls ===
The console features parental controls, which can be used to prohibit younger users from playing games with content unsuitable for their age level. When one attempts to play a Wii or Virtual Console game, it reads the content rating encoded in the game data; if this rating is greater than the system's set age level, the game will not load without a password. Parental controls may also restrict Internet access, which blocks the Internet Channel and system-update features. Since the console is restricted to GameCube functionality when playing GameCube Game Discs, GameCube software is unaffected by Wii parental-control settings.

The Wii also includes a system that records the playtime based on any game or app on the system. While Nintendo decided against a profile system that would require each user to identify themselves, they kept the cumulative playtime tracking system, which cannot be erased or altered, to give parents the means to review their children's use of the Wii.

== Games ==
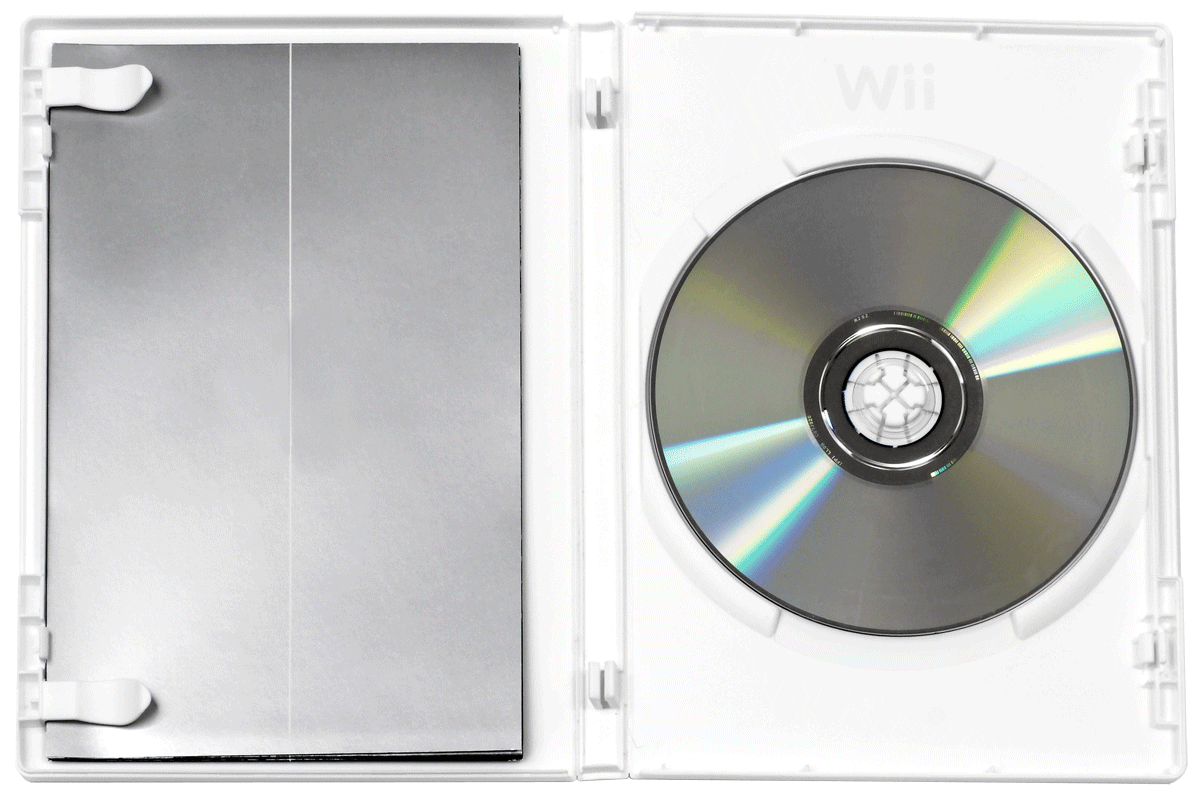
Wii optical disc in case

Retail copies of games are supplied on proprietary, DVD-type Wii optical discs, which are packaged in keep cases with instructions. In Europe, the boxes have a triangle at the bottom corner of the paper sleeve-insert side. The triangle is color-coded to identify the region for which the game is intended and which manual languages are included. The console supports regional lockout: software available in a region can be only played on that region's hardware.

Twenty-one games were announced for launch day in North and South America, with another twelve announced for release later in 2006. Among the system's launch games in all regions were Wii Sports, which was bundled in all Wii packages except in Japan and South Korea, The Legend of Zelda: Twilight Princess, Sega's Super Monkey Ball: Banana Blitz, and Ubisoft's Red Steel. Metroid Prime 3: Corruption had been scheduled as a Wii launch game, but was delayed to 2007 a few months before the Wii's launch. Nintendo had also planned to release Super Smash Bros. Brawl as a launch game, but its director, Masahiro Sakurai, said there were problems in adapting the format to the Wii's motion controls.

New Wii games included those from Nintendo's flagship franchises such as The Legend of Zelda, Super Mario, Pokémon, and Metroid. Nintendo has received third-party support from companies such as Ubisoft, Sega, Square Enix, Activision Blizzard, Electronic Arts, and Capcom, with more games being developed for Wii than for the PlayStation 3 or Xbox 360. Nintendo also launched the New Play Control! line, a selection of enhanced ports of first-party GameCube games that have been updated to capitalize on the Wii's motion controls.

=== Backward compatibility ===
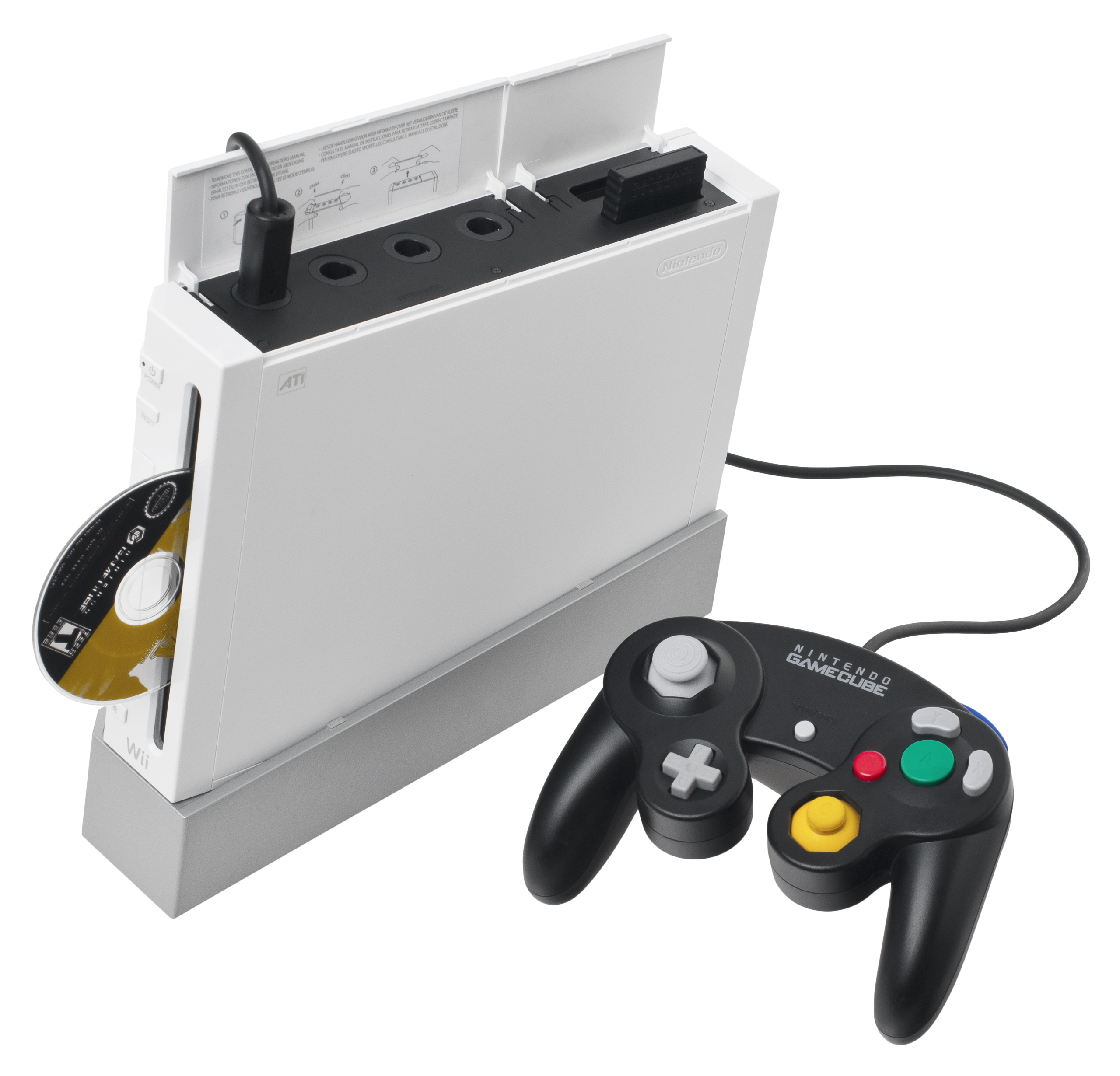
The first model of the Wii has GameCube Memory Card and controller slots to provide backward compatibility.

The original launch Wii consoles are backward-compatible with all GameCube software, memory cards, and controllers, although Korean Wii consoles do not have backward compatibility. A Wii console in the backwards compatibility mode is restricted to GameCube functionality, and a GameCube controller is required to play and a GameCube memory card. Because of the lack of the expansion port on the Wii, devices using the expansion port, such as the GameCube Broadband Adapter and Modem Adapter and the Game Boy Player do not work. The revised Wii model and the Wii Mini lack the GameCube backward compatibility features.

=== Virtual Console ===
The Virtual Console service allowed Wii owners to play games originally released for Nintendo's older consoles, including the Nintendo Entertainment System, Super Nintendo Entertainment System, and the Nintendo 64. Later updates included games from third-party consoles and computers, including the Sega Genesis/Mega Drive and Sega Mark III/Master System, NEC TurboGrafx-16/PC Engine, SNK Neo Geo, the Commodore 64 computer, the MSX computer (only in Japan), and various arcade games through Virtual Console Arcade. Virtual Console games were distributed over broadband Internet via the Wii Shop Channel and were saved to the Wii internal flash memory or to a removable SD card. Once downloaded, Virtual Console games can be accessed from the Wii Menu as individual channels or from an SD card via the SD Card Menu.

=== WiiWare ===
WiiWare was Nintendo's foray into digital distribution on the Wii, comparable to the existing Xbox Live Arcade and PlayStation Network. The service allowed players to purchase games digitally through the Wii Shop, downloading the games to their console to be directly ran from it. Besides facilitating this form of distribution, WiiWare was also envisioned to help support smaller and independent game developers, offering these teams a less expensive route to produce Wii games without having to go through retail production and distribution channels. The WiiWare channel launched on March 25, 2008, and remained active including through the Wii U's lifetime until the Wii Shop Channel was discontinued in 2019.

== Reception ==
=== Critical reviews ===
The system was well received after its exhibition at E3 2006, winning the Game Critics Awards for Best of Show and Best Hardware. Later in December, Popular Science named the console a Grand Award Winner in home entertainment. The game proceeded to win multiple awards; the console was awarded Spike TV's Video Games Award, a Golden Joystick from the Golden Joystick Awards, and an Emmy Award for game controller innovation from the National Academy of Television Arts and Sciences. IGN and The Guardian named the Wii the 10th greatest video game console of all time out of 25, and GameSpot chose the console as having the best hardware in its "Best and Worst 2006" awards.

The Wii was praised for its simple yet responsive controls, as well as its simplicity that appeals to broader audiences. Although Dan Grabham of Tech Radar enjoyed its simple mechanics, stating how "even grandparents can pick things up pretty quickly", he also enjoyed the depth of content carried over from the GameCube. CNET likened the "no-brainer" setup and the easy to navigate home screen. Will Wright, the creator of The Sims, called the Wii "the only next gen system I've seen", and rather considered the PS3 and the Xbox 360 as simply successors with "incremental improvement". He believed that the Wii did not only improve on graphics, but also complimented how it "hits a completely different demographic". Reviewers were fond of the compact design, with Ars Technica comparing it to an Apple product.

By 2008, two years after the Wii's release, Nintendo acknowledged several limitations and challenges with the system (such as the perception that the system catered primarily to a "casual" audience and was unpopular among hardcore gamers). Miyamoto admitted that the lack of support for high-definition video output on the Wii and its limited network infrastructure also contributed to the system being regarded separately from its competitors' systems, the Xbox 360 and PlayStation 3. Miyamoto originally defended Nintendo's decision to not include HD graphics in the Wii, stating that the number of HDTV's in people's homes at the time was "really not that high, yet. Of course I think five years down the road it would be pretty much a given that Nintendo would create an HD system, but right now the predominant television set in the world is a non-HD set." In 2013, Miyamoto said in an interview with Japanese video game website 4Gamer that "Even for the Wii, no matter how much it made the system cost, it would have been great if it were HD in the first place."

At the same time, criticism of the Wii Remote and Wii hardware specifications had surfaced. Former GameSpot editor and Giantbomb.com founder Jeff Gerstmann stated that the controller's speaker produces low-quality sound, while Factor 5 co-founder Julian Eggebrecht stated that the console has inferior audio capabilities and graphics. UK-based developer Free Radical Design stated that the Wii hardware lacks the power necessary to run the software it scheduled for release on other seventh-generation consoles. Online connectivity of the Wii was also criticized; Matt Casamassina of IGN compared it to the "entirely unintuitive" service provided for the Nintendo DS.

Although the Wii Mini was met with praise for being cheap, considering it was bundled with a Wii Remote, Nunchuk and a copy of Mario Kart Wii, it was considered inferior compared to the original console. Critics were disappointed in the lack of online play and backward compatibility with GameCube games, and also believed the hardware was still rather quite large, being about half the size of the Wii; Eurogamer's Richard Leadbetter thought the Wii Mini was not any more "living room friendly", as he believed the "bright red plastics make it stand out much more than the more neutral blacks and whites of existing model's casing." He stated that the overall design was rough in texture, and seemed to have been built with emphasis on durability. Nintendo Life reviewer Damien McFerran said that the lightweight design of the Wii Mini makes it feel "a little cheaper and less dependable" with empty space inside the shell. CNET criticized the pop-open lid for inserting disks to be "cheap-feeling".

=== Third-party development ===
The Wii's success caught third-party developers by surprise due to constraints of the hardware's distinct limitations; this led to apologies for the quality of their early games. In an interview with Der Spiegel, Ubisoft's Yves Guillemot and Alain Corre admitted that they made a mistake in rushing out their launch game, promising to take future projects more seriously. An executive for Frontline Studios stated that major publishers were wary of releasing exclusive games for the Wii, due to the perception that third-party companies were not strongly supported by consumers. 1UP.com editor Jeremy Parish stated that Nintendo was the biggest disappointment for him in 2007. Commenting on the lack of quality third-party support for the Wii, he stated that the content was worse than its predecessors, resulting in "bargain-bin trash".

Additionally, the lack of third-party support also came from the fact that first-party games released by Nintendo were too successful, and developers were having issues with competing. Game developers, such as Rod Cousens, CEO of Codemasters were having issues with the slow sales on the Wii. The Nikkei Business Daily, a Japanese newspaper, claimed that companies were too nervous to start or continue making games for the console, some of which considering the Wii to be a fad that will eventually die down in popularity. Nintendo believed this was the case because they "[knew] the Wii's special characteristics better than anyone", and began developing the games for the console long before its release, giving them a head start.

Due to struggling sales during 2010, developers began creating alternative options. Capcom took note of the difficulty of making money on the Wii, and shifted their content to making fewer games, but with higher quality. According to Sony, many third-party developers originally making games for the Wii started focusing attention more of the PlayStation 3 and Xbox 360.

=== Sales ===
Raw data

Initial consumer reaction to the Wii appears to have been positive, with commentators judging the launch to have been successful. The launch of the Wii in November 2006 was considered the largest console launch by Nintendo in the Americas, Japan, Europe and Australia. The console outsold combined sales of the PlayStation 3 and Xbox 360 in several regions in its launch period. The Wii remained in short supply through the first year. The company had already shipped nearly 3.2 million units worldwide by the end of 2006, and worked to raise production amounts to 17.5 million through 2007, but warned consumers that there would be shortages of the Wii through that year. Wii sales surpassed Xbox 360 sales by September 2007. To meet further demand, Nintendo increased production rates of the Wii from 1.6 million to around 2.4 million units per month in 2008, planning to meet the continued demand for the console.

At the March 2009 Game Developers Conference, Iwata reported that the Wii had reached 50 million sales. Nintendo announced its first price reductions for the console in September 2009, dropping the MSRP from $249.99 to $199.99. The price cut had come days after both Sony and Microsoft announced similar price cuts on the PlayStation 3 and Xbox 360 consoles. Nintendo stated that the price reduction was in anticipation of drawing in more consumers who still cautious about buying a video game console. The Wii became the best-selling home video game console produced by Nintendo during 2009, with sales exceeding 67 million units.

In 2010, sales of the Wii began to decline, falling by 21 percent from the previous year. The drop in sales was considered to be due to a combination of the introduction of the PlayStation Move and Kinect motion control systems on the PlayStation 3 and Xbox 360 systems, and the waning fad of the Wii system. Wii sales also weakened into 2011 as third-party support for the console waned; major publishers were passing over the Wii which was underpowered and used non-standard development tools, and instead focused on games for the PlayStation 3, Xbox 360 and personal computers. Publishers were also drawn away from the Wii with the promise of the more powerful Wii U in the near future. Wii sales continued to decline into 2012, falling by half from the previous year. After its release in Canada on December 7, 2012, the Wii Mini had sold 35,700 units by January 31, 2013.

The Wii surpassed 100 million units sold worldwide during the second quarter of 2013. The Wii had total lifetime sales of 101.63 million consoles worldwide as of March 31, 2016, the last reported data for the console by Nintendo. (Note: Nintendo did not report any further sales of the Wii Mini which it continued to sell through 2017 in its future earnings reports.) At least 48 million consoles were sold in North America, 12 million in Japan, and 40 million in all other regions. As of 2020, the Wii is the fifth-best-selling home console of all time, surpassed by the original PlayStation (102.4 million units), the PlayStation 4 (117.2 million units), the Nintendo Switch (125.62 million units), and the PlayStation 2 (159 million units). As of 2023, the Wii is Nintendo's second-best-selling home console, having been outsold by the Nintendo Switch in late 2021 at 143.42 million units.

As of September 30, 2021, nine Wii games had sold over ten million units globally, which included Wii Sports (82.90 million, including pack-in copies), Mario Kart Wii (37.38 million), Wii Sports Resort (33.14 million), New Super Mario Bros. Wii (30.32 million), Wii Play (28.02 million), Wii Fit (22.67 million), Wii Fit Plus (21.13 million), Super Smash Bros. Brawl (13.32 million), and Super Mario Galaxy (12.80 million). A total of 921.85 million Wii games had been sold by June 30, 2022. The popularity of Wii Sports was considered part of the console's success, making it a killer app for the Wii as it drew those that typically did not play video games to the system.

=== Legal issues ===
There were a number of legal challenges stemming from the Wii and Wii Remote. Several of these were patent-related challenges from companies claiming the Wii Remote infringed on their patents. Most of these were either dismissed or settled out of court. One challenge was from iLife Technologies Inc., who sued Nintendo over their Wii Remote's motion detection technology for patent infringement in 2013. iLife initially won a US$10.1 million judgement against Nintendo in 2017. The case was overturned in 2020, with the appellate court ruling that iLife's patents were too broad to cover the specific motion detection technologies developed by Nintendo.

There were lawsuits against Nintendo claiming physical damage done by ineffective wrist straps on the Wii Remote when they slipped out of players' hands and broke television screens or windows. The first class action suit filed in December 2006 led Nintendo to issue a product recall for the existing wrist straps and send out new versions that had an improved securing mechanism for the wrist. A second class action lawsuit was filed by a mother in Colorado in December 2008, claiming the updated wrist straps were still ineffective. This suit was dismissed by September 2010, finding for Nintendo that the wrist straps were not knowingly faulty under Colorado consumer protection laws.

== Legacy ==
=== Impact on Nintendo ===
The Wii has been recognized as Nintendo's "blue ocean" strategy to differentiate itself from its competitors Sony and Microsoft for the next several years. The Wii has since become seen as a prime example of an effective blue ocean approach. While Sony and Microsoft continued to innovate their consoles on hardware improvements to provide more computational and graphics power, Nintendo put more effort towards developing hardware that facilitated new ways to play games. This was considered a key part to the success of the console, measured by sales over its competitors during that console generation. However, Nintendo did not maintain this same "blue ocean" approach when it took towards designing the Wii U, by which point both Sony and Microsoft had caught up with similar features from the Wii. These factors partially contributed towards weak sales of the Wii U.

Part of the Wii's success was attributed to its lower cost compared to the other consoles. While Microsoft and Sony have experienced losses producing their consoles in the hopes of making a long-term profit on software sales, Nintendo reportedly had optimized production costs to obtain a significant profit margin with each Wii unit sold. Soichiro Fukuda, a games analyst at Nikko Citigroup, estimated that in 2007, Nintendo's optimized production gave them a profit from each unit sold ranging from $13 in Japan to $49 in the United States and $74 in Europe. The console's final price at launch of $249.99 made it comparatively cheaper than the Xbox 360 (which had been available in two models priced at $299 and $399) and the then-upcoming PlayStation 3 (also to be available in two models priced at $499 and $599). Further, Nintendo's first-party games for the Wii were set at a retail price of $50, about $10 less expensive than average games for Nintendo's competitors. Iwata stated they were able to keep the game price lower since the Wii was not as focused on high-resolution graphics in comparison to the other consoles, thus keeping development costs lower, averaging about $5 million per game compared to $20 million required for developing on the Xbox 360 or PlayStation 3.

=== Health effects ===
The Wii was marketed to promote a healthy lifestyle via physical activity. It has been used in physical rehabilitation, and its health effects have been studied for several conditions. The most studied uses of Wii for rehabilitation therapy are for stroke, cerebral palsy, Parkinson's disease, and for balance training. The potential for adverse effects from video game rehabilitation therapy (for example, from falls) has not been well studied as of 2016.

A study published in the British Medical Journal stated that Wii players use more energy than they do playing sedentary computer games, but Wii playing was not an adequate replacement for regular exercise. Some Wii players have experienced musculoskeletal injuries known as Wiiitis, Wii knee, Wii elbow (similar to tennis elbow) or nintendinitis from repetitive play; a small number of serious injuries have occurred, but injuries are infrequent and most are mild.

In May 2010, Nintendo gave the American Heart Association (AHA) a $1.5 million gift; the AHA endorsed the Wii with its Healthy Check icon, covering the console and two of its more active games, Wii Fit Plus and Wii Sports Resort.

=== Homebrew, hacking, and emulation ===
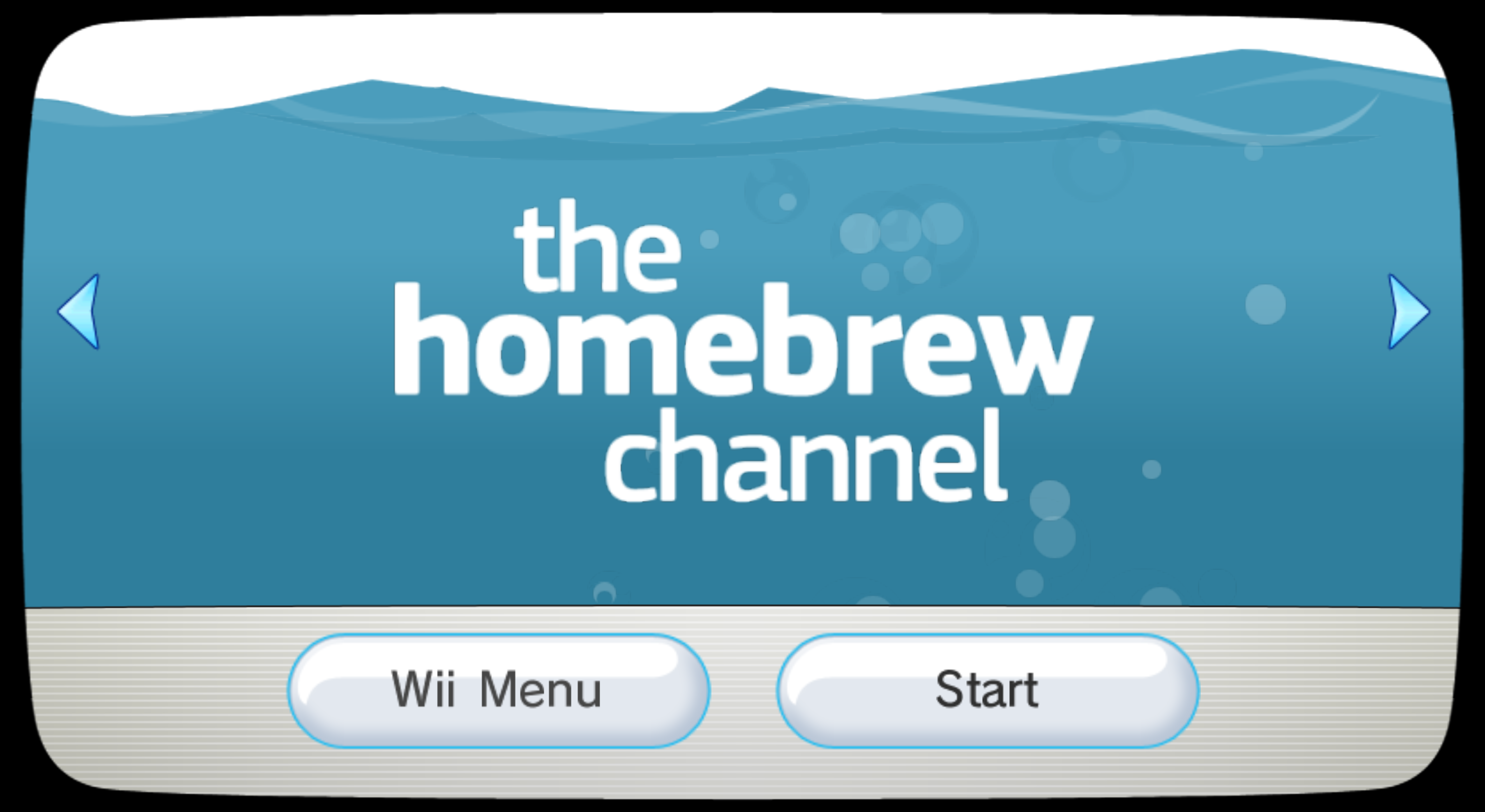
The Homebrew Channel, a custom-built channel that is used to run unsigned programs on the Wii

Demonstration of the Wii Remote used as the sensor for a light pen-type computer input device

The Wii has become a popular target for homebrewing new functionality and video games since its discontinuation. For example, homebrew projects have been able to add DVD playback to unmodified Wii consoles. The Wii also can be hacked via software exploits to enable an owner to use the console for activities unintended by the manufacturer. Several brands of modchips are available for the Wii.

The Wii Remote also became a popular unit to hack for other applications. As it connected through standard Bluetooth interfaces, programmers were able to reverse engineer the communications protocol and develop application programming interfaces for the Wii Remote for other operating systems, and subsequently games and applications that used the Wii Remote on alternate platforms. Further hacks at the hardware level, typically taking apart the Wii Remote and Sensor Bar and reconfiguring its components in other configurations, led to other applications such as remote hand and finger tracking, digital whiteboards, and head tracking for virtual reality headsets.

The Wii has been a popular system for emulation; while the act of creating such emulators in a cleanroom-type approach have been determined to be legal, the actions of bringing the Wii system software and games to other systems has been of questionable legality and Nintendo has actively pursued legal action against those that distribute copies of their software. The open-source Dolphin project has been able to successfully emulate the Wii and GameCube through several years of cleanroom efforts.

=== Music ===
Joe Skrebels of IGN has argued that the Wii's greatest and longest lasting legacy is that of the music composed by Totaka for the console, writing: "Motion controls, Miis, and balance boards have all been removed or diminished as Nintendo moved on, but take a quick look across YouTube, TikTok, or Twitter, and I guarantee it won't take all that long to hear a Wii track. Covers and memes featuring music from the Wii are everywhere. Music written for the Wii has taken on a new life as a cultural touchstone, and inspired people far beyond the confines of the little white wedge it was composed for." The Washington Post's Michael Andor Brodeur described the Mii Channel music as "a cultural touchstone", while Martin Robinson of Eurogamer called the theme of the Wii Shop Channel "a song so infectious it went on to become a meme"; both the Mii Channel theme and Wii Shop Channel theme have inspired jazz covers.

== See also ==
- History of Nintendo
