= Hollywood Candy Company =

American confectionery company

The Hollywood Candy Company, or Hollywood Brands, was an American confectionery company formed in Hollywood, Carver County, Minnesota, in 1912 by Frank Martoccio.

== History ==
In 1911, Frank Martoccio's F.A. Martoccio Macaroni Company acquired the defunct Pratt and Langhoft Candy factory. He had initially only wanted to purchase a similar machine to replace one that had burnt out at his own macaroni factory but was talked into acquiring the entire plant and entering the confectionery business. In 1920, Martoccio created the Zero bar. He introduced a synthetic coating to keep them from melting in warm temperatures, helping their sales in the South before air conditioning became generally available.

In 1927, he purchased the Pendergast Candy Company of Minneapolis, Minnesota. In the early 1920s, Pendergast had discovered a method of making a fluffy nougat for candy bars, having added far too many eggs to a batch of German-style dark nougat. This method was used to introduce the Milkshake candy bar that year.

Martoccio introduced the Payday candy bar in 1932. The company was renamed to Hollywood Candy Company in 1933, after its location in Hollywood, Minnesota. The business moved to Centralia, Illinois, in 1938. By 1960, the factory over 600 employees with sales of more than $30 million.

In 1968, the Martoccio family sold Hollywood Brands to Consolidated Foods, later Sara Lee. The original Centralia plant was destroyed in a fire in 1980.

In 1988 Hollywood Brands was acquired by the Leaf Candy Company, which became part of the Hershey Company in 1996. Hershey discontinued Hollywood's existing candy bars except for Payday and Zero.

== Products ==
Amongst Hollywood's confectionery products were:

- Butter-Nut (1916) with use of the name successfully defended in a court case challenging the name for use in a chocolate bar
- Zero (1920) - A caramel, peanut, and almond nougat bar covered in white chocolate.
- Polar (1924)
- Milkshake Candy Bar (1927) - A chocolate-flavored nougat, caramel, and milk chocolate covering. Similar to a Milky Way bar, but with malt flavor instead of chocolate flavor only. Discontinued in 1980.
- Payday (1932) - Caramel nougat coated with whole peanuts.
- Hollywood - Caramel, nougat, and peanuts covered in bittersweet dark chocolate.
- Red Sails (1936)
- Big Time (1940) - A Milkshake bar with peanuts
- Smooth Sailin' (1950s) - vanilla nougat and walnut pieces covered in (dark chocolate.
- 747
- Almond
- Swinger
- Buccaneers
- Treasure Bar
- Nut Sundae Bar
- Sno King Candy Bar
- Teddy Bear (peanuts, chocolate, nougat)
- Nut Patti (almonds, chocolate, nougat)
- Tafy Nut / Tofy-Nut
- 3 Big Bears (three chocolate bars in one)
- Top Star (coconut, caramel, nougat)
