= Hollywood (graphics chip) =

Graphics chip used in the Nintendo Wii

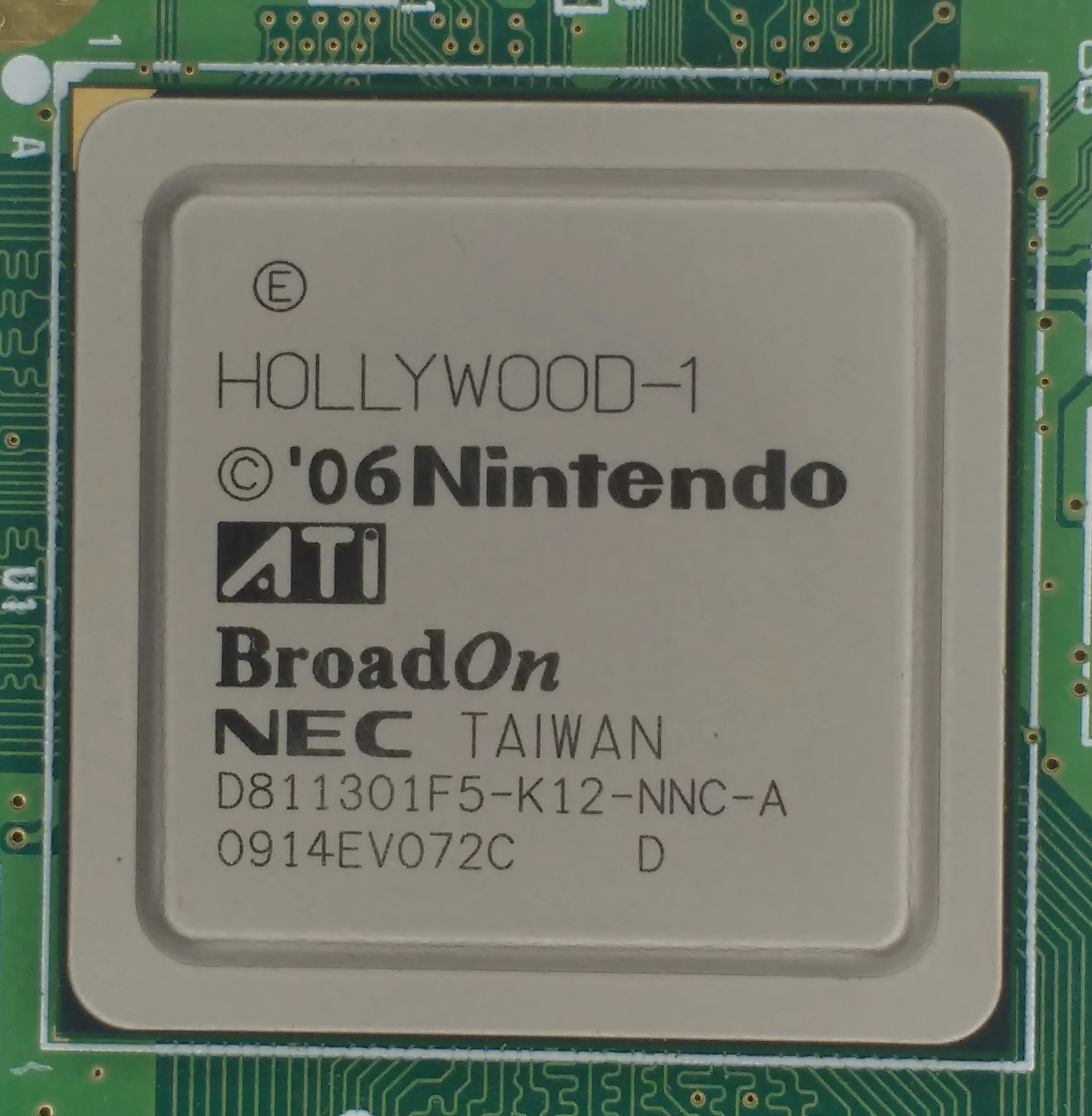
- ATI "Hollywood" GPU within the Wii console
- Designed by: ATI
- Fabrication process: 90 nm or 65 nm CMOS

Hollywood is a system-on-a-chip (SoC) designed by ATI for Nintendo's Wii home video game console, integrating graphics, audio, and input/output functions into a single module. Its graphics processing unit (GPU) is an updated version of the GameCube's Flipper, running at 243 MHz—1.5 times faster—allowing for more advanced visual effects. Additionally, Hollywood includes Starlet, an ARM-based coprocessor responsible for managing input/output operations and system security. The SoC also features 24 MB of high-speed 1T-SRAM for efficient data access.

The initial Hollywood-A revision was built on a 90 nm process and contained three dies. The first die, codenamed Vegas, handled most of the chip's functions. The second die, codenamed Napa, housed the high-speed RAM, while a third die contained EEPROM.

The Hollywood-1 revision, codenamed Bollywood, was manufactured on a 65 nm process and merged Napa and Vegas into a single die.

== Hardware capabilities ==
- 243 MHz graphics chip
- 3 MB embedded GPU memory (eDRAM)
  - 2 MB dedicated to Z-buffer and framebuffer
  - 1 MB texture cache
- 24 MB 1T-SRAM @ 486 MHz (3.9 GB/s) directly accessible for textures and other video data
- Fixed function pipeline (no support for programmable vertex or pixel shaders in hardware)
- Texture Environment Unit (TEV) capable of combining up to 8 textures in 16 stages or "passes"
- ~30 GB/s internal bandwidth^
- ~18 million polygons/second^
- 972 Mpixels/sec peak pixel fillrate

Note: ^ denotes speculation: using confirmed ATI GameCube data x 1.5, a crude but likely accurate way of calculating the Wii's results based on clock speeds and identical architecture.

== Texture Environment Unit ==
The Texture Environment Unit (TEV) is a unique piece of hardware exclusive to the GameCube and Wii. The Wii inherited the TEV from Flipper, and the TEV is—to use an analogy from Factor 5 director Julian Eggebrecht—"like an elaborate switchboard that makes the wildest combinations of textures and materials possible."

The TEV pipeline combines up to 8 textures in up to 16 stages at once. Each stage can apply a multitude of functions to the texture. This was frequently used to simulate pixel shader effects such as bump-mapping, or to perform effects such as cel shading. On the GameCube, Factor 5's Star Wars: Rogue Squadron II used the TEV for the targeting computer effect and the simulated volumetric fog. The Wii's TEV unit and TEV capabilities are no different from the GameCube's, excluding indirect performance advantages from the faster clock speeds.

== Starlet ==
Hollywood contains an ARM926EJ-S core. The internal name for this core is IOP, but it is commonly known as Starlet. This embedded microprocessor runs the Wii's IOS operating system, and handles various I/O functions, including wireless communication, USB, SD card access, optical disc reading, and internal flash storage. Starlet also manages security functions, including cryptography, ensuring the console remains secure even if the main Broadway processor is compromised. Hollywood includes hardware implementations of AES and SHA-1 to speed up Starlet's security functionality. Starlet communicates with Broadway via an inter-process communication mechanism and can reboot Broadway or provide it with executable code at any time.
