= Véronique Sanson discography =

- Studio albums: 15
- Live albums: 9
- Compilation albums: 7
- Singles: 42

This article presents the discography of the French pop singer Véronique Sanson.

== Albums ==
=== Studio albums ===
Year	Album	Chart				Certification (France)
Year	Album	France	Belgium	Switzerland	Switzerland (Romandie)	Certification (France)
1972	Amoureuse	—	—	—	—	2× Gold
1972	De l'autre côté de mon rêve	—	108	—	—	2× Gold
1974	Le maudit	—	—	—	—	2× Gold
1976	Vancouver	1	—	—	—	Platinum
1977	Hollywood	1	—	—	—	2 x Gold
1979	7ème	2	—	—	—	Gold
1981	Laisse-la vivre	1	—	—	—	2× Gold
1985	Véronique Sanson	15	—	—	—	Gold
1988	Moi le venin	22	—	—	—	2× Gold
1992	Sans regrets	6	—	—	—	Platinum
1998	Indestructible	2	19	—	—	2× Gold
1999	D'un papillon à une étoile	2	5	81	—	Platinum
2004	Longue distance	1	3	14	—	Gold
2010	Plusieurs Lunes	3	15	26	3	2× Gold
2016	Dignes, dingues, donc...	3	11	14	1	Gold
2018	Duos volatils	7	22	20	—	Gold

=== Live albums ===
Year	Album	Chart			Certification (France)
Year	Album	France	Belgium	Switzerland	Certification (France)
1976	Live at the Olympia	—	—	—	Gold
1981	Au Palais des Sports	—	—	—	Gold
1986	Olympia 85	—	—	—	—
1989	À l'Olympia 89	40	—	—	—
1990	Symphonique Sanson	45	—	—	2 x Gold
1993	Zénith 93	3	—	—	Platinum
1995	Comme ils l'imaginent	3	11	—	2 x Platinum
2000	Avec vous	25	—	—	—
2005	Olympia 2005	28	32	95	—

=== Compilations ===
Year	Album	Chart			Certification (France)	Notes
Year	Album	France	Belgium	Switzerland	Certification (France)	Notes
1981	Les plus belles chansons	—	—	—	2× Gold	
1984	Exclusivement féminin	—	—	—	—	
1994	Les plus belles chansons volume 1	—	—	—	—	
1994	Les plus belles chansons volume 2	—	—	—	—	
1998	Les plus belles chansons volume 1	—	—	—	—	(Second edition)
1998	Les plus belles chansons volume 2	—	—	—	—	(Second edition)
2001	Les moments importants	76	176	—	Gold	(2 CD, 3 unreleased tracks)
2007	Petits moments choisis	15	79	—	—	(3 CD, Rare and unreleased tracks, live CD3 w/ 19 tracks)
2008	Et voilà ! Intégrale 1967–2007	—	—	—	—	(22 CD + 4 DVD, Complete discography, 53 rare and unreleased tracks, limited edition, 1500 copies)
2010	Et voilà ! Intégrale 1967–2007	—	—	—	—	(Second edition, 1000 copies)
2012	Amoureuse, 1972–2012	8	20	—	—	(Box set: remastered CD of Amoureuse + 11 demo songs + vinyl version of the original album + 2 CD live album recorded in Brussels, photo book)
2015	Les années américaines – Best of Véronique Sanson	12	45	100	—	(2 CD + a vinyl version of CD1. 3 CD Deluxe edition w/ CD3 for a previously unreleased Olympia 1975 concert)

== Singles ==
- 1969 : "Le printemps est là" (written by Donovan, adapted by Véronique Sanson)
- 1972 : "Mariavah" b/w "Amoureuse" (Elektra 12 040)
- 1972?: "Amoureuse" (French version)
- 1972 : "Besoin de personne" (Elektra 12 046)
- 1972 : "Comme je l'imagine" (Elektra 12 065)
- 1973 : "Chanson sur une drôle de vie" (Elektra 12 083)
- 1973?: "Amoureuse" (English Version) b/w "Cent fois" (Elektra 12 135)
- 1974 : "Alia Soûza" (Canada)
- 1974 : "Le Maudit"
- 1976 : "Vancouver"
- 1977 : "Féminin"
- 1977 : "Bernard's song" (Canada)
- 1977 : "How Many Lies"
- 1979 : "Ma Révérence"
- 1979 : "Celui qui n'essaie pas (ne se trompe qu'une seule fois)"
- 1979 : "Toute une vie sans te voir"
- 1980 : "Lerida"
- 1981 : "L'amour qui bat"
- 1981 : "Doux dehors, fou dedans"
- 1984 : "Le temps est assassin"
- 1985 : "C'est long, c'est court"
- 1985 : "J'y perds des plumes"
- 1988 : "Allah"
- 1988 : "Un peu d'air pur et hop !"
- 1989 : "Amoureuse" (symphonique)
- 1989 : "Paranoïa"
- 1992 : "Rien que de l'eau" – No. 6 in France
- 1992 : "Panne de cœur" – No. 46 in France
- 1993 : "Mon voisin"
- 1993 : "Bernard's song" (live)
- 1994 : "Seras-tu là ?" (live) – No. 10 in France
- 1994 : "Bahia"
- 1995 : "Une nuit sur ton épaule" (duet with Marc Lavoine) – No. 34 in France
- 1995 : "Alia Soûza" (duet with Michel Fugain)
- 1995 : "Quelques mots d'amour"
- 1998 : "Un être idéal" – No. 34 in France
- 1998 : "Je me suis tellement manquée"
- 1998 : "Un amour qui m'irait bien"
- 1999 : "Paradis blanc"
- 2000 : "Si tu t'en vas"
- 2000 : "Pour me comprendre"
- 2000 : "Attendre" (live)
- 2004 : "J'aime un homme"
- 2004 : "L'homme de farandole"
- 2004 : "La douceur du danger"
- 2010 : "La nuit se fait attendre"
- 2010 : "Qu'on me pardonne"
- 2012 : "Juste pour toi"
- 2012 : "Chanson sur une drôle de vie"
- 2014 : "Amoureuse"
- 2016 : "Et je l'appelle encore"

== See also ==
Certifications in France
