= Little Hollywood Historic District =

Historic district in Connecticut, United States

- U.S. National Register of Historic Places
- U.S. Historic district
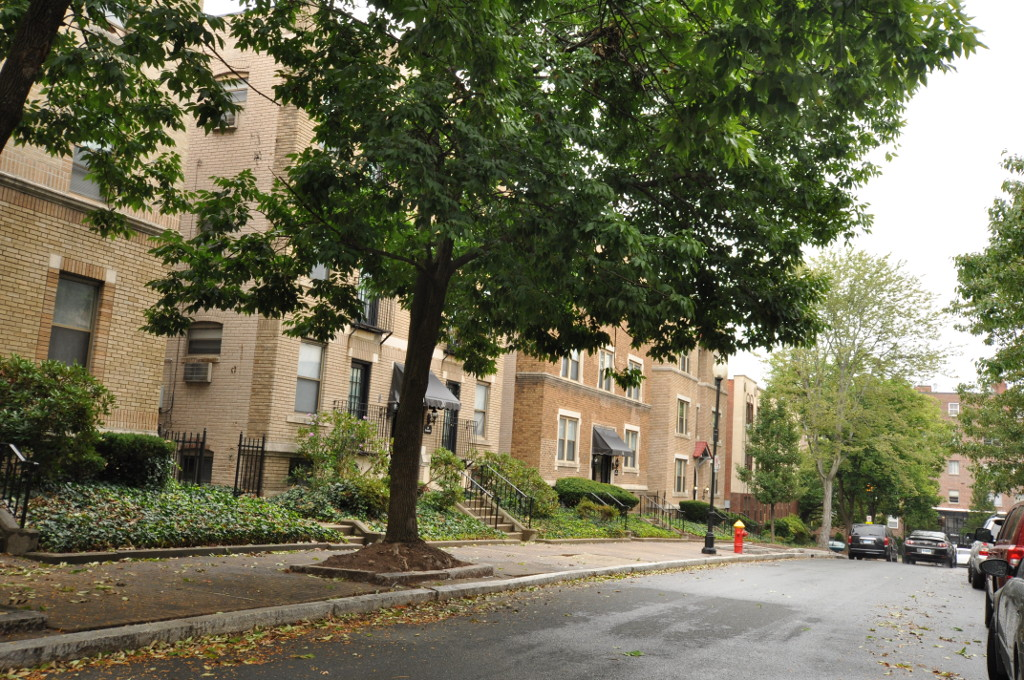

- Location within Connecticut Location within the United States
- Location: Farmington Avenue, Owen, Frederick and Denison Streets, Hartford, Connecticut
- Coordinates: 41°45′58″N 72°42′20″W
- Area: 8 acres (3.2 ha)
- Built: 1907
- Architect: Matthews, George H.; Et al.
- Architectural style: Queen Anne, Shingle Style, Georgian Revival
- NRHP reference No.: 82004423
- Added to NRHP: April 29, 1982

The Little Hollywood Historic District encompasses a concentrated collection of apartment buildings built mainly between the world wars in the West End neighborhood of Hartford, Connecticut. Located on Farmington Avenue and Owen, Frederick, and Denison Streets, they were built primarily to attract single tenants seeking small apartments, a trend that developed after World War I and ended after World War II. The district was listed on the National Register of Historic Places in 1982.

== Description and history ==
Hartford's Asylum Hill neighborhood, located West of the City Center, was for many years a fashionable address, where handsome houses and small estates were built for the city's business, political, and cultural elite. By the early 20th century, increased mobility pushed desirable addresses further out of the city, and the Asylum Hill area began to be redeveloped to attract a more middle-class populace. The Little Hollywood area, located in the West End just West of the Nook Farm area, began to be developed in this way before World War I, with a series of apartment houses on Farmington Avenue. Owen, Frederick, and Denison Streets were developed between 1919 and 1923. Most of the buildings were designed by local architects, with the single largest number (16 of the 39 buildings) the work of George H. Matthews.

The historic district includes a row of brick apartment houses, three and four stories in height, on the North Side of Farmington Avenue, just East of Loraine Street. Two prominent buildings are on the South Side, on Either Side of Owen Street. These are the most architecturally sophisticated of the district's buildings, showing a diversity of styles including the Renaissance Revival, Chicago School, and the Jacobethan. Owen, Frederick, and Denison Streets include a mix of pre-World War II and post-World War II buildings; the latter are excluded from the district. These, while still showing some architectural style, are generally simpler than those facing Farmington Avenue.

== See also ==
- National Register of Historic Places listings in Hartford, Connecticut
