= Zero bar =

Candy bar by Hershey

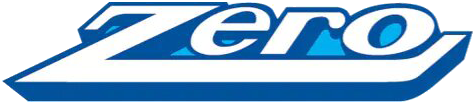

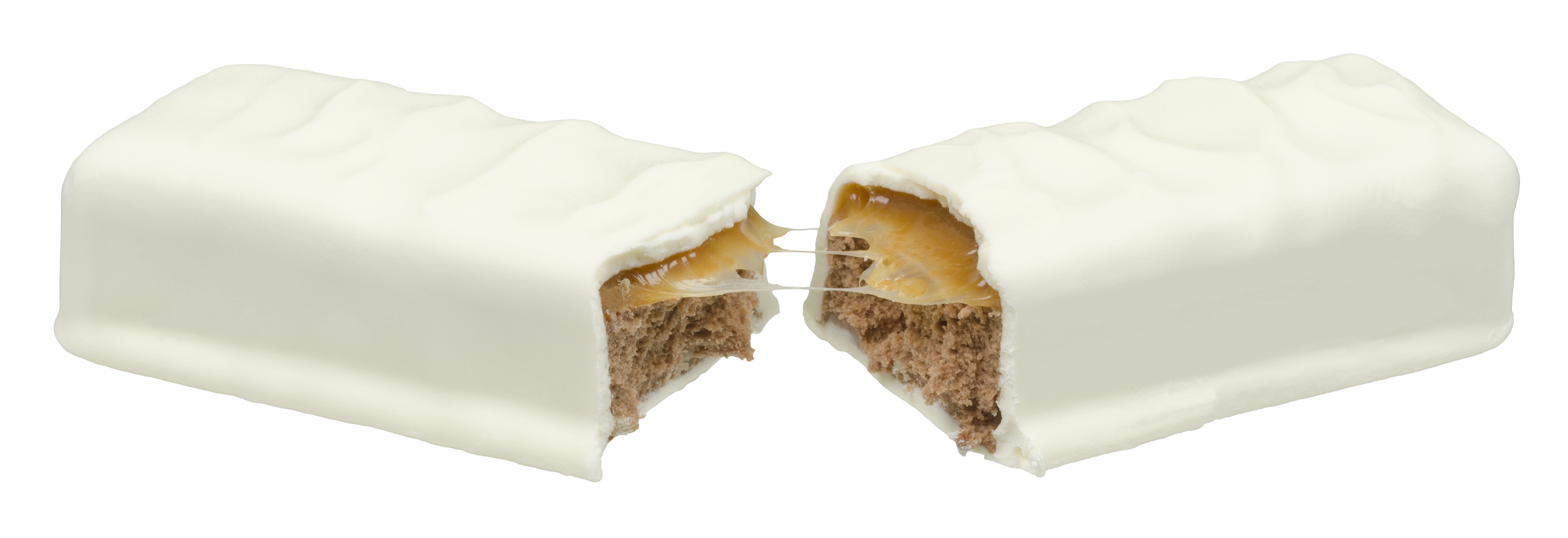
- A candy bar that combines caramel, peanuts, and almond nougat coated with white fudge.
- Product type: Candy bar
- Current owner: Iconic IP Interests, LLC
- Produced by: The Hershey Company
- Country: United States
- Introduced: 1920s
- Related brands: Hershey's White Crème with Almonds
- Website: hersheyland.com/zero

The Zero candy bar is a candy bar composed of a combination of caramel, peanut and almond nougat covered with a layer of white fudge. Its outwardly white color — an unusual color for a candy bar — has become its trademark. The white coating does not contain cocoa butter, so it does not technically qualify as white chocolate. Zero resembles Snickers, a candy manufactured by Mars, except Zero is white instead of dark brown.

== History ==
The Zero bar was initially named "Double Zero", intending to sound icy cool. The name was shortened to Zero in 1934. The coating melted at a higher temperature than brown chocolates, which made the bar a popular choice for summer vending in the pre-air conditioning South.

Hollywood Brands was first sold to Consolidated Foods Corporation in 1967 (which later became Sara Lee) and production continued after a fire destroyed the Centralia plant in 1980. A new production facility opened in 1983, and in 1988 Hollywood Brands was purchased by Huhtamaki Oyj of Helsinki, Finland, and became part of Leaf, Inc.

Hershey Foods Corporation took over Leaf North America confectionery operations in 1996, and with it came the production of the Zero candy bar.

== Variation and sale ==
Zero Bar Nutrition Facts
- Type: Candy Bar
- Food energy (per 52g serving): 230 kcal (960 kJ)
Nutritional value
(per 52g serving)
- Protein: 3 g
- Fat: 8 g
- Carbohydrate: 37 g

The candy bar is sold in three different sizes. According to the official website, its traditional size is a singular bar at 1.85 ounces (52 g), comparable to the traditional full-size Hershey Bar which is 1.55 ounces (44 g). As of 2020, the candy bar can also be purchased in a king size at 3.4 ounces (96 g). Finally, the candy is sold in a pack of 6 containing individually wrapped bars coming in at 1.85 ounces (52 g).

== Reviews ==
In October 2020, Rhett McLaughlin and Link Neal of Good Mythical Morning deemed the Zero bar the "worst candy bar in the world" in a multi-day bracketed review of several different candy bars.

Some critics have deemed the bar as a "white chocolate Snickers", even though the Zero bar predates Snickers by a decade and its white coating does not contain cocoa butter, which makes it not technically qualify as white chocolate.

== See also ==
- List of chocolate bar brands
