= Palo santo (disambiguation) =

Palo santo (Spanish for sacred stick or holy wood etc.) may refer to:

== Trees ==
- Lignum vitae, heartwood of tree species of the genus Guaiacum, native to subtropical and tropical regions of the Americas
- Bulnesia sarmientoi, a tree species native to the Gran Chaco area in South America
- Bursera graveolens, a tree species native to South America, used for incense, aromatic oil, and indigenous medicine

== Other uses ==
- Palo Santo (Shearwater album), a 2006 album by indie rock band Shearwater, or the title track
- Palo Santo (Years & Years album), a 2018 album by British band Years & Years, or the title track
- "Palo Santo", a song by X Ambassadors from their 2021 album The Beautiful Liar

== See also ==
- Holy Wood (disambiguation)
- Santo (disambiguation)
- Palo (disambiguation)
