= Holy Wood =

Holy Wood or Holywood may refer to:

== Places ==
- Holywood, County Down, a town and townland in Northern Ireland
  - Holywood, County Down (civil parish), a civil parish in County Down, Northern Ireland
  - Holywood railway station (Northern Ireland)
- Holywood, Dumfries and Galloway, a village and civil parish in south west Scotland
  - Holywood railway station (Scotland), a former station

== Arts ==
- Holy Wood (novel), an unpublished novel by Marilyn Manson
- Holy Wood (In the Shadow of the Valley of Death), a 2000 album by Marilyn Manson
- Holy Wood, a fictional location in the 1990 DiscWorld novel Moving Pictures by Terry Pratchett

== Other ==
- Holywood F.C., a football club in Northern Ireland
- Christopher Holywood (1559–1626), 17th-century Jesuit
- Guaiacum sanctum, commonly known as Holywood or Holywood Lignum-vitae

== See also ==
- Palo santo (disambiguation), (Spanish: holy wood)
- Wood (disambiguation)
- Holy (disambiguation)
