= Hollywood, Minnesota =

Unincorporated community in Minnesota, US

Hollywood
- Unincorporated community
- Location within Minnesota Location within the United States
- Coordinates: 44°54′21″N 93°58′17″W
- Country: United States
- State: Minnesota
- County: Carver
- Elevation: 974 ft (297 m)
- Time zone: UTC-6 (Central (CST))
  - Summer (DST): UTC-5 (CDT)
- Area code: 952
- GNIS feature ID: 645098

Hollywood is an unincorporated community in Carver County, in the U.S. state of Minnesota.

== History ==
Hollywood was platted in 1856. A post office was established at Hollywood in 1859, closed in 1860, reopened in 1872, closed permanently in 1888.
