= Tamil Script Code for Information Interchange =

Digital representation of text characters

Tamil Script Code for Information Interchange (TSCII) is a coding scheme for representing the Tamil script. The lower 128 codepoints are plain ASCII, and the upper 128 codepoints are TSCII-specific. After long years of being used on the Internet by private agreement only, it was successfully registered with the IANA in 2007.

TSCII encodes the characters in visual (written) order, paralleling the use of the Tamil Typewriter. Unicode, instead, uses the logical order encoding strategy for Tamil, following ISCII, in contrast to the case of Thai, where the visual order encoding grandfathered by TIS-620 was adopted.

The government of Tamil Nadu endorses its own TAB/TAM standards for 8-bit encoding and other, older encoding schemes can still be found on the web.

== History ==
The need for a common encoding for Tamil was felt by members of various mailing list based forums in the mid-1990s, as there were multiple custom coded fonts were prevalent in those forums. While some of the commercial encodings were popular than the others, they were not accepted by wider community due to conflicting commercial interests. While Unicode was accepted by most as the future standard, most of the desktop systems at that time were still not capable of handling Unicode for Tamil language, and an interim 8-bit encoding was required.

A separate mailing list for discussion of such encodings (webmasters@Tamil.net) was created in 1997 to initiate this discussion, starting with an email written by Dr.K.Kalyanasundaram to the popular Tamil author Sujatha who headed the committee for standardization of Tamil keyboard. This forum quickly attracted enthusiastic participants from across the globe, including several prominent Tamil scholars. Archives of these discussion are maintained by INFITT.

Subsequent to publishing TSCII, most of the members of webmasters@Tamil.net mailing list became part of INFITT, which is a wider initiative to bring in standardization and continued development in various areas of Tamil computing.

== Codepage layout ==
TSCII
	0	1	2	3	4	5	6	7	8	9	A	B	C	D	E	F
8x	௦ (Note: U+0BE6 TAMIL DIGIT ZERO, which was added with Unicode version 4.1 in March, 2005)	௧	ஸ்ரீ	ஜ	ஷ	ஸ	ஹ	க்ஷ	ஜ்	ஷ்	ஸ்	ஹ்	க்ஷ்	௨	௩	௪
9x	௫	‘	’	“	”	௬	௭	௮	௯	ஙு	ஞு	ஙூ	ஞூ	௰	௱	௲
Ax	NBSP	ா	ி	ீ	ு	ூ	ெ	ே	ை	©	ௗ	அ	ஆ		ஈ	உ
Bx	ஊ	எ	ஏ	ஐ	ஒ	ஓ	ஔ	ஃ	க	ங	ச	ஞ	ட	ண	த	ந
Cx	ப	ம	ய	ர	ல	வ	ழ	ள	ற	ன	டி	டீ	கு	சு	டு	ணு
Dx	து	நு	பு	மு	யு	ரு	லு	வு	ழு	ளு	று	னு	கூ	சூ	டூ	ணூ
Ex	தூ	நூ	பூ	மூ	யூ	ரூ	லூ	வூ	ழூ	ளூ	றூ	னூ	க்	ங்	ச்	ஞ்
Fx	ட்	ண்	த்	ந்	ப்	ம்	ய்	ர்	ல்	வ்	ழ்	ள்	ற்	ன்	இ	

== Conversion Tools ==
Text encoded in UTF-8 can be converted to TSCII using the GNU iconv tools as follows,

$ iconv -f utf-8 -t tscii hello.utf8 > hello.tscii

Whereas conversion from TSCII to UTF-8 is done by interchanging -f and -t flags.

== See also ==
- TACE16 (Tamil All Character Encoding)
- Tamil keyboard
- தமிழ் 99
- InScript
- Tamil (Unicode block)
- Tamil blogosphere
