= Tamil keyboard =

Keyboard layout

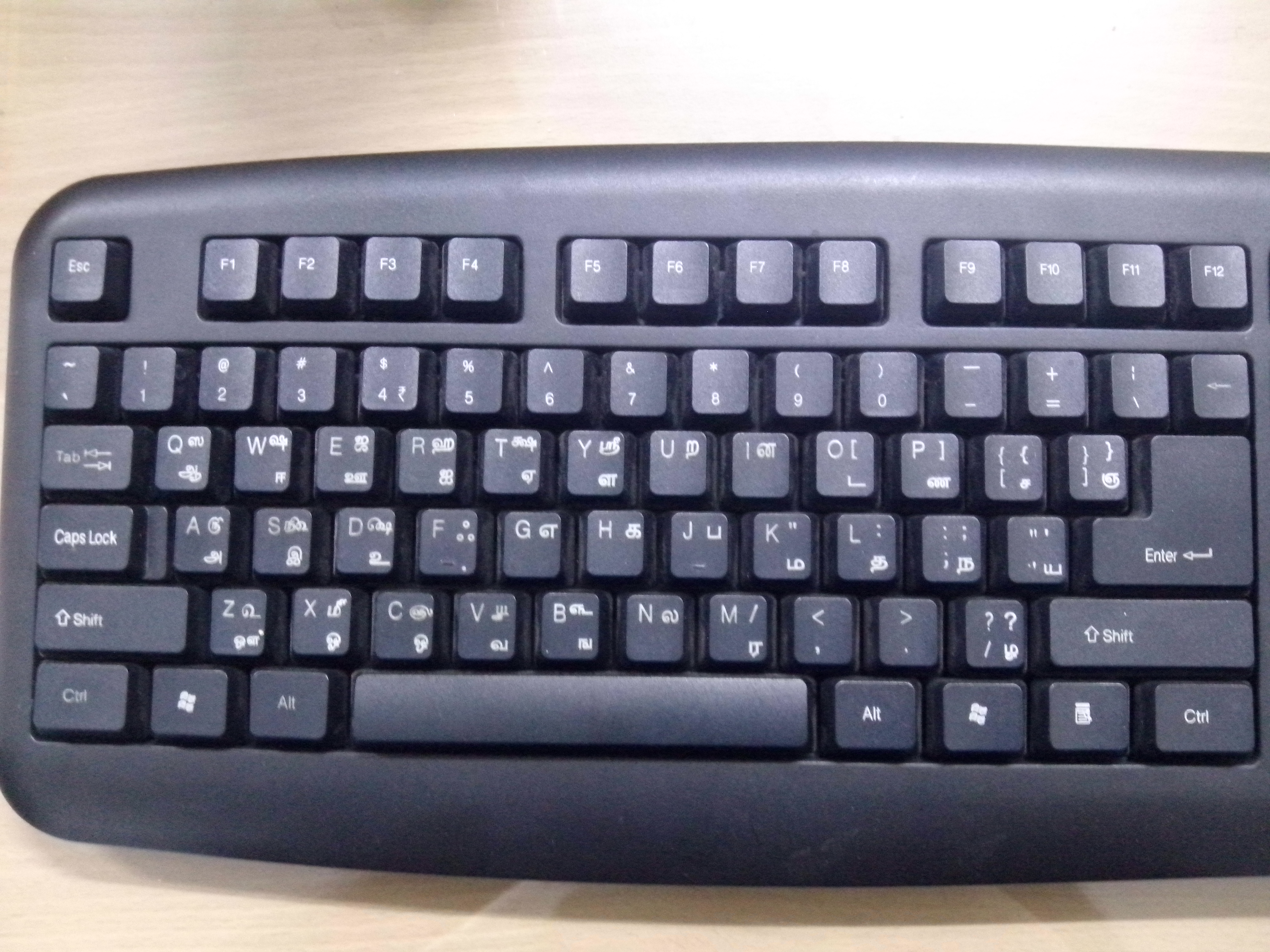
Digraphic Tamil 99 keyboard with the Latin and Tamil scripts

The Tamil keyboard is used in computers and mobile devices to input text in the Tamil script.

The keyboard layout approved by the Government of Tamil Nadu is Tamil 99. The InScript keyboard is the keyboard layout standardized by the Government of India for inputting text in the languages of India written in Brahmic scripts.

Tamil keyboards are often digraphic, combining the Tamil script with the Latin alphabet.

== Tamil input methods ==
There are different systems developed to type Tamil language characters using a typewriter or a computer keyboard. Several programs such as Azhagi and NHM writer provide both fixed and phonetic type layouts for typing.

== Phonetic Computer Layouts ==
- Google transliteration
- Google Input Method Editors(Google IME)
- Transliteration provided by Azhagi software

== Tamil 99 ==
Tamil 99 is a keyboard layout approved by the Tamil Nadu Government. The layout, along with several monolingual and bilingual fonts for use with the Tamil language, was approved by Government order on 13 June 1999.

Designed for use with a normal QWERTY keyboard, typing follows a consonant-vowel pattern. The arrangement of the characters allow for fast and simple typing for users familiar with the script.

== InScript ==
InScript (Indian Script) is the standard keyboard for Indian scripts. It is a touch typing keyboard layout for computer. This keyboard layout is standardized by Government of India for inputting text in languages of India written in Brahmic scripts, as well as the Santali language, written in the non-Brahmic Ol Chiki script. It was developed by Indian Government and supported by several public and private organisations. This is the standard keyboard for 12 Indian scripts including Bengali, Devanagari, Gujarati, Gurmukhi, Kannada, Malayalam, Oriya, Tamil and Telugu etc.

== See also ==
- Tamil 99
- InScript
- Brahmic keyboard layouts
- Keyboard layout
- Tamil (Unicode block)
- Tamil blogosphere
- Tamil All Character Encoding
