= Indian blogosphere =

Online community

The Indian blogosphere (or IndiBlogosphere) is the online predominantly community of Indian weblogs that is part of the larger blogosphere.

== History ==
In India, like elsewhere, blogging gained momentum in the early years of the twenty-first century. However, it was limited mostly to English. With the advent of unicode when typing in Indian languages on computer became possible, blogs in Indian languages started to be written. Initially due to a lack of Indic typing tools, the early Indian blogosphere was small. Greater awareness and availability of Indic typing tools led to rapid growth in blogs written in Indian languages.

An impressionistic survey of Indian [English] blogosphere in 2019 says money making is still not the primary goal of most Indian bloggers. Most bloggers open multiple blogs on free blogging platforms and lose interest over time; only a small portion of bloggers sustain their blog beyond the initial spurt.

== Indic language typing tools ==
Although the standard keyboard of Indian languages is InScript yet Phonetic transliteration based typing became most popular for Unicode Indic typing in spite of its drawbacks. The two most popular phonetic typing tools of old times are "Indic IME" and "BarahaIME". In 2007, with the advent of the Google Indic Transliteration tool in its blogging service Blogger, it became the tool of choice for new bloggers due to its dictionary based nature and low learning curve.

== Blog platform ==
India has over 20 official languages and yet most Indian blogs are still written in English. However, a large number of blogs are created in Hindi and other Indian languages. These blogs are written as stand-alone blogs or on popular blogging platforms. Among Indian blogs written in languages other than English, Google's Blogger is the most popular among Indian bloggers because it supports Indic Unicode and has rich features. In 2007, the Indic language typing tool Google Indic Transliteration was also integrated into it, so no separate Indic typing tool was needed. Blogspot (Blogger) also provides the facility of custom domain redirects such as .com, in and others. There is also the .বাংলা domain for Bengali sites.

In addition to this, WordPress being supporting Indic Unicode, is most popular among those who host their blog on their own domain. Though since every website uses UTF-8 encoding, most languages are supported by default everywhere.

== See also ==
- Blogosphere
- Hindi blogosphere
- Online journalism in India
- Tamil blogosphere
- Webcomics in India
