= Azhagi =

Azhagi (lit. 'beauty' in Tamil) may refer to:

- Azhagi (1953 film), a 1953 Indian film directed by Sundar Rao Nadkarni
- Azhagi (2002 film), a 2002 Indian romantic drama film directed by Thangar Bachchan
- Azhagi (TV series), an Indian soap opera
- Azhagi (software), a transliteration tool for Indian languages including Tamil
