= Tibetan (Unicode block) =

- Range: U+0F00..U+0FFF (256 code points)
- Plane: BMP
- Scripts: Tibetan (207 char.); Common (4 char.)
- Major alphabets: Tibetan; Dzongkha
- Assigned: 211 code points
- Unused: 45 reserved code points 2 deprecated

Unicode Version History
- 2.0 (1996): 168 (+168)
- 3.0 (1999): 193 (+25)
- 4.1 (2005): 195 (+2)
- 5.1 (2008): 201 (+6)
- 5.2 (2009): 205 (+4)
- 6.0 (2010): 211 (+6)

Unicode documentation
- Code chart ∣ Web page
- Note: When unifying with ISO 10646, the original Tibetan block was removed in Unicode 1.0.1. The current block (with a new encoding model and a different range) was introduced in version 2.0.

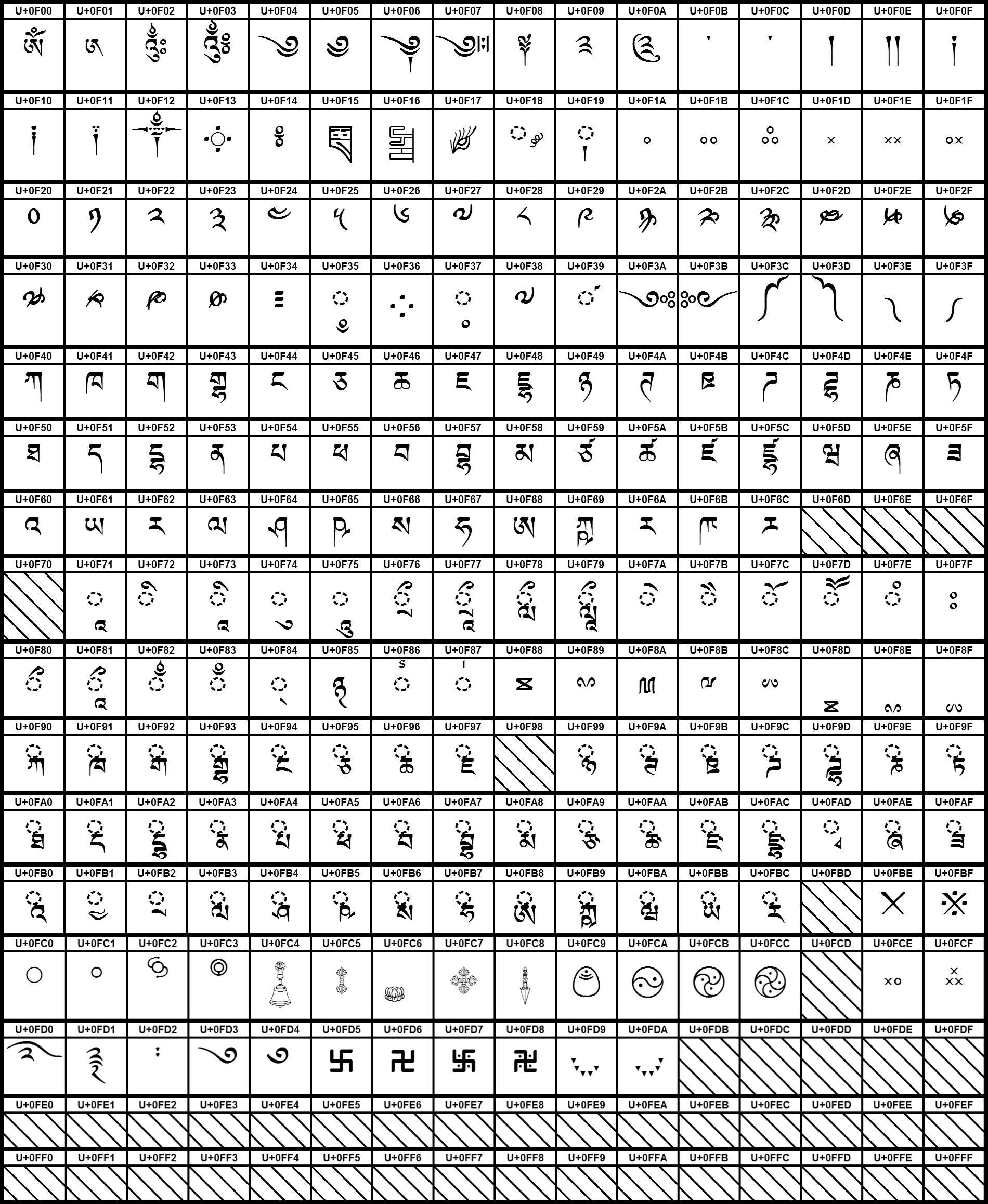
Graphical representation of the Tibetan Unicode block. Hatched fields represent unused code points.

Tibetan is a Unicode block containing characters for the Tibetan, Dzongkha, and other languages of China, Bhutan, Nepal, Mongolia, northern India, eastern Pakistan and Russia.

== Block ==
Tibetan^{[1]}^{[2]}^{[3]} Official Unicode Consortium code chart (PDF)
	0	1	2	3	4	5	6	7	8	9	A	B	C	D	E	F
U+0F0x	ༀ	༁	༂	༃	༄	༅	༆	༇	༈	༉	༊	་	༌ NB	།	༎	༏
U+0F1x	༐	༑	༒	༓	༔	༕	༖	༗	༘	༙	༚	༛	༜	༝	༞	༟
U+0F2x	༠	༡	༢	༣	༤	༥	༦	༧	༨	༩	༪	༫	༬	༭	༮	༯
U+0F3x	༰	༱	༲	༳	༴	༵	༶	༷	༸	༹	༺	༻	༼	༽	༾	༿
U+0F4x	ཀ	ཁ	ག	གྷ	ང	ཅ	ཆ	ཇ		ཉ	ཊ	ཋ	ཌ	ཌྷ	ཎ	ཏ
U+0F5x	ཐ	ད	དྷ	ན	པ	ཕ	བ	བྷ	མ	ཙ	ཚ	ཛ	ཛྷ	ཝ	ཞ	ཟ
U+0F6x	འ	ཡ	ར	ལ	ཤ	ཥ	ས	ཧ	ཨ	ཀྵ	ཪ	ཫ	ཬ			
U+0F7x		ཱ	ི	ཱི	ུ	ཱུ	ྲྀ	ཷ	ླྀ	ཹ	ེ	ཻ	ོ	ཽ	ཾ	ཿ
U+0F8x	ྀ	ཱྀ	ྂ	ྃ	྄	྅	྆	྇	ྈ	ྉ	ྊ	ྋ	ྌ	ྍ	ྎ	ྏ
U+0F9x	ྐ	ྑ	ྒ	ྒྷ	ྔ	ྕ	ྖ	ྗ		ྙ	ྚ	ྛ	ྜ	ྜྷ	ྞ	ྟ
U+0FAx	ྠ	ྡ	ྡྷ	ྣ	ྤ	ྥ	ྦ	ྦྷ	ྨ	ྩ	ྪ	ྫ	ྫྷ	ྭ	ྮ	ྯ
U+0FBx	ྰ	ྱ	ྲ	ླ	ྴ	ྵ	ྶ	ྷ	ྸ	ྐྵ	ྺ	ྻ	ྼ		྾	྿
U+0FCx	࿀	࿁	࿂	࿃	࿄	࿅	࿆	࿇	࿈	࿉	࿊	࿋	࿌		࿎	࿏
U+0FDx	࿐	࿑	࿒	࿓	࿔	࿕	࿖	࿗	࿘	࿙	࿚					
U+0FEx																
U+0FFx																
Notes 1.As of Unicode version 18.0 2.Grey areas indicate non-assigned code points 3.Unicode code points U+0F77 and U+0F79 are deprecated in Unicode 5.2 and later

== Former Tibetan block ==
Tibetan (Unicode 1.0.0)
- Range: U+1000..U+104F (80 code points)
- Plane: BMP
- Scripts: Tibetan
- Major alphabets: Tibetan; Dzongkha
- Status: Deleted prior to the release of Unicode 2.0
- Now occupied by: Myanmar

Unicode Version History
- 1.0.0 (1991): 71 (+71)
- 1.0.1 (1992): 0 (-71)

Chart
- Code chart
- Note: When unifying with ISO 10646, the original Tibetan block was deleted in Unicode 1.0.1. Tibetan was later reintroduced with a new encoding model for Unicode 2.0.

The Tibetan Unicode block is unique for having been allocated in version 1.0.0 with a virama-based encoding that was unable to distinguish visible srog med and conjunct consonant correctly. (Note: In most Unicode Indic encodings, although one can force the system to display a visible halanta by using the zero-width non-joiner (ZWNJ) or force the use of a non‑conjunct joining form using the zero-width joiner (ZWJ), there is no method to force a conjunct consonant rendering, which is crucial when writing Tibetan. Some exceptions exist: for instance, Sinhala uses ZWJ to force a conjunct.) This encoding was removed from the Unicode Standard in version 1.0.1 in the process of unifying with ISO 10646 for version 1.1, then reintroduced as an explicit root/subjoined encoding, with a larger block size, in version 2.0. Moving or removing existing characters has been prohibited by the Unicode Stability Policy for all versions following Unicode 2.0, so the Tibetan characters encoded in Unicode 2.0 and all subsequent versions are immutable.

The range of the former Unicode 1.0.0 Tibetan block has been occupied by the Myanmar block since Unicode 3.0. In Microsoft Windows, collation data referring to the old Tibetan block was retained as late as Windows XP, and removed in Windows 2003.

Tibetan (Unicode 1.0.0)^{[1]}^{[2]} Official Unicode Consortium code chart (PDF)
	0	1	2	3	4	5	6	7	8	9	A	B	C	D	E	F
U+100x	ཀ	ཁ	ག	ང	ཅ	ཆ	ཇ	ཉ	ཊ	ཋ	ཌ	ཎ	ཏ	ཐ	ད	ན
U+101x	པ	ཕ	བ	མ	ཙ	ཚ	ཛ	ཝ	ཞ	ཟ	འ	ཡ	ར	ལ	ཤ	ཥ
U+102x	ས	ཧ	ཨ				ི	ྀ	ུ	ེ	ོ	྅	ཿ		ཾ	༽
U+103x	༷	྾		༄	།	་	ྃ	ྂ	༔	༑	༈	༵	༼	ཻ	ཽ	
U+104x	༠	༡	༢	༣	༤	༥	༦	༧	༨	༩	༎	྄	༹			
Notes: 1. As of Unicode version 1.0.0. Characters are shown by means of corresponding code points in Unicode 2.0 and all subsequent versions.; 2. Grey areas indicate non-assigned code points

== History ==
The following Unicode-related documents record the purpose and process of defining specific characters in the Tibetan block:

Version	Final code points (Note: Proposed code points and characters names may differ from final code points and names)	Count	UTC ID	L2 ID	WG2 ID	Document
2.0	U+0F00..0F47, 0F49..0F69, 0F71..0F8B, 0F90..0F95, 0F97, 0F99..0FAD, 0FB1..0FB7, 0FB9	168		X3L2/92-144	N808	Lofting, Peter; Ross, Hugh McGregor (1992-05-13), Comments on Tibetan Script
2.0	U+0F00..0F47, 0F49..0F69, 0F71..0F8B, 0F90..0F95, 0F97, 0F99..0FAD, 0FB1..0FB7, 0FB9	168			N1095	Zhaxi, Nima, Proposal for encoding Tibetan script on BMP
2.0	U+0F00..0F47, 0F49..0F69, 0F71..0F8B, 0F90..0F95, 0F97, 0F99..0FAD, 0FB1..0FB7, 0FB9	168			N1185	Proposal for encoding Tibetan script on BMP of ISO/IEC 10646
2.0	U+0F00..0F47, 0F49..0F69, 0F71..0F8B, 0F90..0F95, 0F97, 0F99..0FAD, 0FB1..0FB7, 0FB9	168			N1159	New consolidated Tibetan Proposal, 1995-03-10
2.0	U+0F00..0F47, 0F49..0F69, 0F71..0F8B, 0F90..0F95, 0F97, 0F99..0FAD, 0FB1..0FB7, 0FB9	168			N1192	Proposal Summary Form, Tibetan, 1995-03-28
2.0	U+0F00..0F47, 0F49..0F69, 0F71..0F8B, 0F90..0F95, 0F97, 0F99..0FAD, 0FB1..0FB7, 0FB9	168			N1203	Umamaheswaran, V. S.; Ksar, Mike (1995-05-03), "RESOLUTION M27.22", Unconfirmed minutes of SC2/WG2 Meeting 27, Geneva
2.0	U+0F00..0F47, 0F49..0F69, 0F71..0F8B, 0F90..0F95, 0F97, 0F99..0FAD, 0FB1..0FB7, 0FB9	168	UTC/1995-029			Everson, Michael, Tibetan Character Set for Information Interchange (code chart)
2.0	U+0F00..0F47, 0F49..0F69, 0F71..0F8B, 0F90..0F95, 0F97, 0F99..0FAD, 0FB1..0FB7, 0FB9	168	UTC/1995-024B			Lofting, Peter (1995-05-31), Updated Tibetan Code Chart (U+xx00 - U+xxFF)
2.0	U+0F00..0F47, 0F49..0F69, 0F71..0F8B, 0F90..0F95, 0F97, 0F99..0FAD, 0FB1..0FB7, 0FB9	168	UTC/1995-xxx			"Tibetan Proposal and Report of Ad Hoc Committee", Unicode Technical Committee Meeting #65, Minutes, 1995-06-02
2.0	U+0F00..0F47, 0F49..0F69, 0F71..0F8B, 0F90..0F95, 0F97, 0F99..0FAD, 0FB1..0FB7, 0FB9	168			N1227	Anderson, Lloyd (1995-06-21), Tibetan in 10646
2.0	U+0F00..0F47, 0F49..0F69, 0F71..0F8B, 0F90..0F95, 0F97, 0F99..0FAD, 0FB1..0FB7, 0FB9	168			N1238	Proposal for encoding Tibetan script on BMP, 1995-06-24
2.0	U+0F00..0F47, 0F49..0F69, 0F71..0F8B, 0F90..0F95, 0F97, 0F99..0FAD, 0FB1..0FB7, 0FB9	168		X3L2/95-090	N1253 (doc, txt)	Umamaheswaran, V. S.; Ksar, Mike (1995-09-09), "6.4.5", Unconfirmed Minutes of WG 2 Meeting # 28 in Helsinki, Finland; 1995-06-26--27
2.0	U+0F00..0F47, 0F49..0F69, 0F71..0F8B, 0F90..0F95, 0F97, 0F99..0FAD, 0FB1..0FB7, 0FB9	168			N1263	Everson, Michael (1995-09-18), On the Complexity of Tibetan Character Names
2.0	U+0F00..0F47, 0F49..0F69, 0F71..0F8B, 0F90..0F95, 0F97, 0F99..0FAD, 0FB1..0FB7, 0FB9	168			N1538	Table of Replies and Feedback on Amendment 6 – Tibetan, 1997-01-29
2.0	U+0F00..0F47, 0F49..0F69, 0F71..0F8B, 0F90..0F95, 0F97, 0F99..0FAD, 0FB1..0FB7, 0FB9	168		L2/97-126	N1562	Paterson, Bruce (1997-05-27), Draft Report on JTC1 letter ballot on DAM No. 6 to ISO/IEC 10646-1 (Tibetan)
2.0	U+0F00..0F47, 0F49..0F69, 0F71..0F8B, 0F90..0F95, 0F97, 0F99..0FAD, 0FB1..0FB7, 0FB9	168			N1571	Paterson, Bruce (1997-06-23), Almost Final Text – DAM 6 – Tibetan
2.0	U+0F00..0F47, 0F49..0F69, 0F71..0F8B, 0F90..0F95, 0F97, 0F99..0FAD, 0FB1..0FB7, 0FB9	168		L2/97-288	N1603	Umamaheswaran, V. S. (1997-10-24), "5.3.2", Unconfirmed Meeting Minutes, WG 2 Meeting # 33, Heraklion, Crete, Greece, 20 June – 4 July 1997
2.0	U+0F00..0F47, 0F49..0F69, 0F71..0F8B, 0F90..0F95, 0F97, 0F99..0FAD, 0FB1..0FB7, 0FB9	168			N1739	Paterson, Bruce (1998-05-06), Defect Report on AMD 6 - Tibetan
2.0	U+0F00..0F47, 0F49..0F69, 0F71..0F8B, 0F90..0F95, 0F97, 0F99..0FAD, 0FB1..0FB7, 0FB9	168		L2/99-010	N1903 (pdf, html, doc)	Umamaheswaran, V. S. (1998-12-30), "11.2", Minutes of WG 2 meeting 35, London, U.K.; 1998-09-21--25
2.0	U+0F00..0F47, 0F49..0F69, 0F71..0F8B, 0F90..0F95, 0F97, 0F99..0FAD, 0FB1..0FB7, 0FB9	168		L2/01-301		Whistler, Ken (2001-08-01), "3-part Tibetan vowel signs with a-chung's", Analysis of Character Deprecation in the Unicode Standard
2.0	U+0F00..0F47, 0F49..0F69, 0F71..0F8B, 0F90..0F95, 0F97, 0F99..0FAD, 0FB1..0FB7, 0FB9	168		L2/03-267		Duff, Tony (2003-08-18), Comments on Public Review Issue #12 (Terminal Punctuation)
2.0	U+0F00..0F47, 0F49..0F69, 0F71..0F8B, 0F90..0F95, 0F97, 0F99..0FAD, 0FB1..0FB7, 0FB9	168		L2/03-268		Fynn, Christopher (2003-08-18), Unicode Tibetan [explanation of Unicode in Tibetan]
2.0	U+0F00..0F47, 0F49..0F69, 0F71..0F8B, 0F90..0F95, 0F97, 0F99..0FAD, 0FB1..0FB7, 0FB9	168		L2/05-073		Freytag, Asmus; Fynn, Christopher (2005-02-09), Basic line Breaking rules for Tibetan, Dzongkha, & Ladakhi
2.0	U+0F00..0F47, 0F49..0F69, 0F71..0F8B, 0F90..0F95, 0F97, 0F99..0FAD, 0FB1..0FB7, 0FB9	168		L2/08-287		Davis, Mark (2008-08-04), Public Review Issue #122: Proposal for Additional Deprecated Characters
2.0	U+0F00..0F47, 0F49..0F69, 0F71..0F8B, 0F90..0F95, 0F97, 0F99..0FAD, 0FB1..0FB7, 0FB9	168		L2/08-304		Fynn, Christopher (2008-08-09), Tibetan Chars in PR 122
2.0	U+0F00..0F47, 0F49..0F69, 0F71..0F8B, 0F90..0F95, 0F97, 0F99..0FAD, 0FB1..0FB7, 0FB9	168		L2/08-253R2		Moore, Lisa (2008-08-19), "Consensus 116-C13", UTC #116 Minutes, "Change the deprecated property by removing 0340, 0341, 17D3, and adding 0149, 0F77, 0F79, 17A4, 2329, 232A."
2.0	U+0F00..0F47, 0F49..0F69, 0F71..0F8B, 0F90..0F95, 0F97, 0F99..0FAD, 0FB1..0FB7, 0FB9	168		L2/08-328 (html, xls)		Whistler, Ken (2008-10-14), Spreadsheet of Deprecation and Discouragement
2.0	U+0F00..0F47, 0F49..0F69, 0F71..0F8B, 0F90..0F95, 0F97, 0F99..0FAD, 0FB1..0FB7, 0FB9	168		L2/11-261R2		Moore, Lisa (2011-08-16), "Consensus 128-C6", UTC #128 / L2 #225 Minutes, "Change the general category from "So" to "Po" ... [U+0F14]"
3.0	U+0F6A, 0F96, 0FAE..0FB0, 0FB8, 0FBA..0FBC, 0FBE..0FCC, 0FCF	25		L2/98-024	N1660	Everson, Michael (1997-12-08), Proposal to encode Tibetan Extensions in ISO/IEC 10646
3.0	U+0F6A, 0F96, 0FAE..0FB0, 0FB8, 0FBA..0FBC, 0FBE..0FCC, 0FCF	25		L2/98-070		Aliprand, Joan; Winkler, Arnold, "3.A.2. item c. Tibetan Extensions", Minutes of the joint UTC and L2 meeting from the meeting in Cupertino, February 25-27, 1998
3.0	U+0F6A, 0F96, 0FAE..0FB0, 0FB8, 0FBA..0FBC, 0FBE..0FCC, 0FCF	25		L2/98-218	N1756	Anderson, Lloyd; Chilton, Robert; Duff, Tony; Everson, Michael; Fynn, Christopher; McGowan, Rick; Sirlin, Sam; Whistler, Ken; Ушаков, Валерий (1998-05-27), Proposal for Tibetan Extensions to the UCS
3.0	U+0F6A, 0F96, 0FAE..0FB0, 0FB8, 0FBA..0FBC, 0FBE..0FCC, 0FCF	25		L2/98-286	N1703	Umamaheswaran, V. S.; Ksar, Mike (1998-07-02), "8.8", Unconfirmed Meeting Minutes, WG 2 Meeting #34, Redmond, WA, USA; 1998-03-16--20
3.0	U+0F6A, 0F96, 0FAE..0FB0, 0FB8, 0FBA..0FBC, 0FBE..0FCC, 0FCF	25		L2/98-281R (pdf, html)		Aliprand, Joan (1998-07-31), "Extended Tibetan (IV.D.1.a)", Unconfirmed Minutes – UTC #77 & NCITS Subgroup L2 # 174 JOINT MEETING, Redmond, WA -- July 29-31, 1998
3.0	U+0F6A, 0F96, 0FAE..0FB0, 0FB8, 0FBA..0FBC, 0FBE..0FCC, 0FCF	25			N1864	Comments on N1756 - Tibetan Extensions, 1998-09-17
3.0	U+0F6A, 0F96, 0FAE..0FB0, 0FB8, 0FBA..0FBC, 0FBE..0FCC, 0FCF	25		L2/98-330	N1921	Subdivision Proposal on JTC 1.02.18.01 for Amendment 31: Tibetan Extension to ISO/IEC 10646-1, 1998-10-28
3.0	U+0F6A, 0F96, 0FAE..0FB0, 0FB8, 0FBA..0FBC, 0FBE..0FCC, 0FCF	25		L2/98-331	N1922	Combined PDAM registration and consideration ballot on WD for ISO/IEC 10646-1/Amd. 31, AMENDMENT 31: Tibetan Extension, 1998-10-28
3.0	U+0F6A, 0F96, 0FAE..0FB0, 0FB8, 0FBA..0FBC, 0FBE..0FCC, 0FCF	25		L2/99-010	N1903 (pdf, html, doc)	Umamaheswaran, V. S. (1998-12-30), "8.1.4 and 11.2", Minutes of WG 2 meeting 35, London, U.K.; 1998-09-21--25
3.0	U+0F6A, 0F96, 0FAE..0FB0, 0FB8, 0FBA..0FBC, 0FBE..0FCC, 0FCF	25		L2/99-079.2	N1977R	DRAFT Irish Comments on SC 2 N 3212, 1999-01-19
3.0	U+0F6A, 0F96, 0FAE..0FB0, 0FB8, 0FBA..0FBC, 0FBE..0FCC, 0FCF	25		L2/99-079.1	N1979R	Chinese Comments on SC 2 N 3212, 1999-01-27
3.0	U+0F6A, 0F96, 0FAE..0FB0, 0FB8, 0FBA..0FBC, 0FBE..0FCC, 0FCF	25			N1977	Chinese comments on ISO/IEC 10646-1/PDAM 31: Tibetan Extension, 1999-01-27
3.0	U+0F6A, 0F96, 0FAE..0FB0, 0FB8, 0FBA..0FBC, 0FBE..0FCC, 0FCF	25		L2/99-079		Summary of Voting on SC 2 N 3212, PDAM ballot on WD for ISO/IEC 10646-1/Amd. 31: Tibetan Extension, 1999-02-12
3.0	U+0F6A, 0F96, 0FAE..0FB0, 0FB8, 0FBA..0FBC, 0FBE..0FCC, 0FCF	25			N2022	Paterson, Bruce (1999-04-05), FPDAM 31 Text - Tibetan Extensions
3.0	U+0F6A, 0F96, 0FAE..0FB0, 0FB8, 0FBA..0FBC, 0FBE..0FCC, 0FCF	25		L2/99-111		Text for FPDAM ballot of ISO/IEC 10646, Amd. 31 - Tibetan extensions, 1999-04-06
3.0	U+0F6A, 0F96, 0FAE..0FB0, 0FB8, 0FBA..0FBC, 0FBE..0FCC, 0FCF	25		L2/99-232	N2003	Umamaheswaran, V. S. (1999-08-03), "6.1.5 PDAM31 - Tibetan Extensions", Minutes of WG 2 meeting 36, Fukuoka, Japan, 1999-03-09--15
3.0	U+0F6A, 0F96, 0FAE..0FB0, 0FB8, 0FBA..0FBC, 0FBE..0FCC, 0FCF	25		L2/99-256	N2070	Summary of Voting on SC 2 N 3310, ISO 10646-1/FPDAM 31 - Tibetan extension, 1999-08-19
3.0	U+0F6A, 0F96, 0FAE..0FB0, 0FB8, 0FBA..0FBC, 0FBE..0FCC, 0FCF	25		L2/99-307	N2129	Paterson, Bruce (1999-09-20), Disposition of Comments Report on SC 2 N 3310, ISO/IEC 10646-1/FPDAM 31, AMD. 31: Tibetan extension
3.0	U+0F6A, 0F96, 0FAE..0FB0, 0FB8, 0FBA..0FBC, 0FBE..0FCC, 0FCF	25		L2/99-308	N2130	Paterson, Bruce (1999-10-01), Revised Text for FDAM ballot of ISO/IEC 10646-1/FDAM 31, - AMD. 31: Tibetan extension
3.0	U+0F6A, 0F96, 0FAE..0FB0, 0FB8, 0FBA..0FBC, 0FBE..0FCC, 0FCF	25		L2/99-352	N2130R	ISO 10646-1, Amd. #31 -- Tibetan with correct code charts, 1999-11-01
3.0	U+0F6A, 0F96, 0FAE..0FB0, 0FB8, 0FBA..0FBC, 0FBE..0FCC, 0FCF	25		L2/99-361		Everson, Michael (1999-11-09), Corrected text for ISO/IEC 10646-1/FDAM 31 -- Tibetan extension
3.0	U+0F6A, 0F96, 0FAE..0FB0, 0FB8, 0FBA..0FBC, 0FBE..0FCC, 0FCF	25		L2/00-010	N2103	Umamaheswaran, V. S. (2000-01-05), "6.4.6", Minutes of WG 2 meeting 37, Copenhagen, Denmark: 1999-09-13—16
3.0	U+0F6A, 0F96, 0FAE..0FB0, 0FB8, 0FBA..0FBC, 0FBE..0FCC, 0FCF	25		L2/00-071		Table of replies on ISO/IEC 10646-1: 1993/FDAM 31: Tibetan Extensions, 2000-03-02
4.1	U+0FD0..0FD1	2		L2/04-007	N2694	Everson, Michael; Fynn, Christopher (2003-12-30), Proposal to encode two Bhutanese marks for Dzongkha in the UCS
5.1	U+0F6B..0F6C	2		L2/05-338	N3010	West, Andrew (2005-10-25), Comments on N2985 -- Balti Tibetan additions
5.1	U+0F6B..0F6C	2		L2/05-279		Moore, Lisa (2005-11-10), "Tibetan (C.7)", UTC #105 Minutes
5.1	U+0F6B..0F6C	2			N2953 (pdf, doc)	Umamaheswaran, V. S. (2006-02-16), "7.4.13", Unconfirmed minutes of WG 2 meeting 47, Sophia Antipolis, France; 2005-09-12/15
5.1	U+0F6B..0F6C	2		L2/06-231		Moore, Lisa (2006-08-17), "Scripts - Tibetan characters for Balti", UTC #108 Minutes
5.1	U+0F6B..0F6C	2			N3153 (pdf, doc)	Umamaheswaran, V. S. (2007-02-16), "M49.4", Unconfirmed minutes of WG 2 meeting 49 AIST, Akihabara, Tokyo, Japan; 2006-09-25/29
5.1	U+0F6B..0F6C	2		L2/06-324R2		Moore, Lisa (2006-11-29), "Consensus 109-C2", UTC #109 Minutes
5.1	U+0F6B..0F6C	2		L2/05-244	N2985	Everson, Michael (2009-09-04), Proposal to add four Tibetan characters for Balti to the BMP of the UCS
5.1	U+0FCE	1		L2/05-345R	N3011	West, Andrew (2005-10-24), Proposal to encode one Tibetan astrological character
5.1	U+0FCE	1		L2/05-279		Moore, Lisa (2005-11-10), "Tibetan (C.7)", UTC #105 Minutes
5.1	U+0FCE	1			N3103 (pdf, doc)	Umamaheswaran, V. S. (2006-08-25), "M48.20a", Unconfirmed minutes of WG 2 meeting 48, Mountain View, CA, USA; 2006-04-24/27
5.1	U+0FD2..0FD4	3		L2/05-346	N3012	West, Andrew (2005-10-24), Proposal to encode three archaic Tibetan characters
5.1	U+0FD2..0FD4	3		L2/05-347		Fynn, Christopher (2005-10-27), Comments on: N3012 - Proposal to encode three archaic Tibetan characters
5.1	U+0FD2..0FD4	3		L2/05-364		Fynn, Christopher (2005-11-03), Re: New Tibetan Proposals
5.1	U+0FD2..0FD4	3		L2/05-279		Moore, Lisa (2005-11-10), "Tibetan (C.7)", UTC #105 Minutes
5.1	U+0FD2..0FD4	3		L2/06-043	N3032	West, Andrew (2006-01-30), Proposal to encode one Tibetan punctuation mark
5.1	U+0FD2..0FD4	3		L2/06-044	N3033	West, Andrew (2006-01-30), Proposal to encode two archaic Tibetan punctuation marks
5.1	U+0FD2..0FD4	3		L2/06-008R2		Moore, Lisa (2006-02-13), "C.13", UTC #106 Minutes
5.1	U+0FD2..0FD4	3			N3103 (pdf, doc)	Umamaheswaran, V. S. (2006-08-25), "M48.20b, M48.20c", Unconfirmed minutes of WG 2 meeting 48, Mountain View, CA, USA; 2006-04-24/27
5.1	U+0FD2..0FD4	3			N3153 (pdf, doc)	Umamaheswaran, V. S. (2007-02-16), "M49.1e", Unconfirmed minutes of WG 2 meeting 49 AIST, Akihabara, Tokyo, Japan; 2006-09-25/29
5.1	U+0FD2..0FD4	3		L2/08-317		Muller, Eric (2008-08-11), "1.8", South Asia Subcommittee Report
5.1	U+0FD2..0FD4	3		L2/08-253R2		Moore, Lisa (2008-08-19), "Vedic (B.15.2, E.1)", UTC #116 Minutes
5.2	U+0FD5..0FD8	4			N3353 (pdf, doc)	Umamaheswaran, V. S. (2007-10-10), "M51.19", Unconfirmed minutes of WG 2 meeting 51 Hanzhou, China; 2007-04-24/27
5.2	U+0FD5..0FD8	4		L2/07-148	N3268	Everson, Michael; Fynn, Christopher; Scharf, Peter; West, Andrew (2007-05-09), Proposal to encode four religious characters in the Tibetan block
5.2	U+0FD5..0FD8	4		L2/07-118R2		Moore, Lisa (2007-05-23), "Consensus 111-C19", UTC #111 Minutes
5.2	U+0FD5..0FD8	4		L2/09-060	N3537	Lata, Swaran (2008-10-14), Proposal to add India specific annotation to Right facing Svasti
5.2	U+0FD5..0FD8	4		L2/08-379		Suignard, Michel (2008-10-21), "Ireland T5", Disposition of comments on SC2 N 3989 (PDAM text for Amendment 6 to ISO/IEC 10646:2003)
6.0	U+0F8C..0F8F	4		L2/09-032	N3568	West, Andrew; Fynn, Christopher (2009-01-24), Proposal to encode four Tibetan-Sanskrit letters used in Kalacakra texts
6.0	U+0F8C..0F8F	4		L2/09-003R		Moore, Lisa (2009-02-12), "B.15.11", UTC #118 / L2 #215 Minutes
6.0	U+0F8C..0F8F	4		L2/09-234	N3603 (pdf, doc)	Umamaheswaran, V. S. (2009-07-08), "M54.13d", Unconfirmed minutes of WG 2 meeting 54
6.0	U+0FD9..0FDA	2		L2/09-033	N3569	West, Andrew (2009-01-24), Proposal to encode two Tibetan annotation marks
6.0	U+0FD9..0FDA	2		L2/09-003R		Moore, Lisa (2009-02-12), "B.15.11", UTC #118 / L2 #215 Minutes
6.0	U+0FD9..0FDA	2		L2/09-234	N3603 (pdf, doc)	Umamaheswaran, V. S. (2009-07-08), "M54.13e", Unconfirmed minutes of WG 2 meeting 54
