= Tamil Heritage Foundation =

Non-profit cultural organization in Tamil Nadu, India

Tamil Heritage Foundation International (THFi)
- Nickname: THFi
- Established: 2001
- Type: Tamil Heritage Monuments and Manuscripts preservation through Digitization and cultivate awareness on heritage preservation.
- Purpose: Collect, preserve and digitize documents of Tamil cultural heritage including Tamil literature
- Headquarters: Germany
- Location: Chennai, Tamil Nadu, India, Malaysia, Sri Lanka, Germany, USA, South Africa, Denmark, France, Netherlands, UK.
- President: Dr. Subashini Kanagasundaram
- Website: Tamil Heritage Foundation; THF Executive Council

Tamil Heritage Foundation (THF) is a non-profit organization that collaborates with the British Library to collect, preserve and digitize documents of Tamil cultural heritage. Among activities around the world, the project activities are centered primarily in India, United Kingdom, Germany, Switzerland and South Korea.

== Purpose ==
The purpose of the global effort is to make available hundreds of works, more than 100 years old, that had been collected during British colonial rule of the Tamil speaking people through online access to the digitized documents. Its motto is "to serve Tamil and Tamils across the world". The project allows the modern reader to tap into ancient wisdom about the scientific fields of astronomy, mathematics, medicine, chemistry, and engineering. Cultural life is told in manuscripts about the arts, music and literature.

Pilot project

The limited collection of ancient, rare books and palm-leaf manuscripts are digitally available on the internet or on CD-ROM to the public free of charge. The categories of works include art, language, history and the sciences. Then, the project will be expanded to include several thousand Tamil books. The director of the project is Dr. Narayanan Kannan who was a founding member, in addition to Dr. Kuppusamy Kalyanasundaram and Ms. Subashini Kanagasundaram, who are located in South Korea, Switzerland and Germany, respectively.
