= Rupee sign =

Overview of symbols used to represent currency in rupee-using countries

₨

Rupee sign
- In Unicode: U+20A8 ₨ RUPEE SIGN

Currency
- Currency: Mauritian rupee Nepalese rupee Pakistani rupee Seychellois rupee Sri Lankan rupee

Different from
- Different from: U+09F3 ৳ BENGALI RUPEE SIGN (Bangladeshi taka) U+20B9 ₹ INDIAN RUPEE SIGN (Indian rupee) U+0BF9 ௹ TAMIL RUPEE SIGN (Indian rupee/Sri Lankan rupee alternative sign)

The rupee sign "₨" is a currency sign used to represent the monetary unit of account in Pakistan, Sri Lanka, Nepal, Mauritius, Seychelles, and formerly in India. It resembles, and is often written as, the Latin character sequence "Rs", of which (as a single character) it is an orthographic ligature.

It is common to find a punctuation mark between the rupee symbol and the digits denoting the amount, for example "Re: 1" (for one unit), or "Rs. 140" (for more than one rupee).

On 15 July 2010, India introduced a new currency symbol, the Indian rupee sign, ₹. This sign is a combination of the Devanagari letter र (ra) and the Latin capital letter R without its vertical bar (similar to the R rotunda).

== In Unicode ==
Unicode code points for rupee and related currency
Script	Symbol in Unicode	Unicode version (Note: Version of Unicode standard where the symbol was first included.)
General	U+20A8 ₨ RUPEE SIGN	1.0
General	U+20B9 ₹ INDIAN RUPEE SIGN	6.0
Tamil	U+0BF9 ௹ TAMIL RUPEE SIGN. (Note: Also code 0x96 in TAM (Tamil Monolingual encoding), and code E106 in TACE16 (Tamil All Character Encoding).) Compare ரூ rū, which is also used. (Note: "...the syllable ரூ seen for rupee instead of (the already encoded) ௹.") (Note: The shape at the end of the "tail" is an abbreviation mark that is also used in some other symbols. "In passing, one notes that some sources given a lesser known alternate glyph for rupee where the Tamil abbreviation mark is joined with the ரூ (rū, for rūpāy) below the base and not above (as currently shown in the code chart).")	4.0
Gujarati	U+0AF1 ૱ GUJARATI RUPEE SIGN It has been proposed that this code should be deprecated, and the following sequence used instead: U+0AB0 ર GUJARATI LETTER RA + U+0AC2 ૂ GUJARATI VOWEL SIGN UU + U+0AF0 ૰ GUJARATI ABBREVIATION SIGN → રૂ૰ Unicode Names List notes the latter is "preferred spelling"	4.0
Bengali	U+09F3 ৳ BENGALI RUPEE SIGN, synonym "Bangladeshi taka". Compare ট (ṭô) রু (ru.) and ৳ are also used in Bangla script outside Bangladesh for the Indian rupee/taka.	1.0
North Indic (pre-decimalisation)	U+A838 ꠸ NORTH INDIC RUPEE MARK A rupee was divided into 16 anas (sing. ānā, pl. āne in Hindi), and an ana into 12 pies (Hindi pāī). Fractions were written with vertical marks for quarters and horizontal marks for sixteenths (or, in the case of pies, twelfths). Rupees were written in normal digits, anas as fractions, and pies either as fractions or in a hybrid digit-fraction notation. The rupee mark was placed after the rupees and anas and before the pies. For example, in English, 4 rupees 6 anas and 8 pies would be written "Rs. 4-6-8". (Note the three-part notation is similar to £pounds,shillings/pence in pre-decimal British currency.) The same quantity in Devanagari was written ४꠰꠴꠸꠱꠴ (4 1/4 2/16R2/4 2/12, the ४=4 here is Devanagari, the other symbols were all used across multiple northern scripts). There were intermediate quarter-ana (and in Marharashtra, quarter-rupee) currency units, so this could also be read "4 rupāyā 1 pavalī 2 ānā 2 paisā 2 pāī". 40 rupees would be just ४०꠸, without any fractional part.	5.2
Eastern Nagari (Bangla and Asamiya) – pre-decimalisation	U+09F2 ৲ BENGALI RUPEE MARK (ṭākā); U+09F9 ৹ BENGALI CURRENCY DENOMINATOR SIXTEEN (16 ānā in one ṭākā); U+09FB ৻ BENGALI GANDA MARK (20 gaṇḍā in one ānā) The taka or ana mark was written after the numerals, for example: ৩৭৲ (37 taka); ১৫৷৶৹ (15 taka 7 ana, lit. "15 (4+3)/16"). (Note that the fraction numerator symbols are different from the regular numerals, there is no separator between taka and ana.) The ganda mark was written before the value, e.g. ৻৫ (lit. ganda 5), ৭৷৶৻৭ (7 taka 7 ana 7 ganda).	1.0
Japanese katakana	U+3353 ㍓ SQUARE RUPII is a square version of ルピー rupī, the Japanese word for "rupee". It is intended for CJK Compatibility with earlier character sets.	1.0

== Rp ==
Rp is the standard abbreviation for the Indonesian rupiah.

== Legacy encoding ==
This symbol is not present as a separate code point in ISCII or PASCII.
