= Kuppuswamy Kalyanasundaram =

Indian origin scientist & chemist

- Education: University of Madras; University of Notre Dame
- Scientific career
- Fields: Photochemistry and solar energy conversion
- Workplaces: École Polytechnique Fédérale de Lausanne

Kuppuswamy Kalyanasundaram is a senior scientist and researcher in chemistry at the Swiss Federal Institute of Technology in Lausanne. His major research interests are in photochemistry, solar energy conversion and storage. He is part of the research group that developed "Dye Sensitized Solar Cells". He is best known for his work in Tamil computing and as the founder of Project Madurai.

== Life ==
Kalyanasundaram completed his B.Sc. and M.Sc. in chemistry at the University of Madras in 1969 and 1971 respectively. He received his Ph.D. in Physical Chemistry from University of Notre Dame in 1976. Following two-year post-doctoral work at the Royal Institution of London, UK, he joined the teaching and research staff of the Chemistry Department of the Swiss Federal Institute of Technology where he was in service till 2022. He has held visiting faculty appointments at the California Institute of Technology, Pasadena; University of North Carolina at Chapel Hill; Indian Institute of Science, Bangalore, and VIT University, Vellore. He also holds appointments as Overseas Visiting professor at the Anna University, Chennai. Kalyanasundaram has authored over 140 research papers in international journals and 4 research monographs on his photochemistry research. His research papers are well-cited (over 30,000 citations with an h-index of 58, placing him amongst the top chemists of Switzerland and of chemists of Indian origin).

== Works related to Tamil language ==
- Created and is maintaining a Tamil Electronic Library since 1995.
- Created the Tamil font Mylai in 1989 which made it easier to type Tamil in computers without any specialized software.
- He spearheaded the initiative to create an 8-bit Tamil encoding TSCII. TSCII is the only Indic language encoding to be formally included in the global inventory of font encoding standards for world languages.
- Founded Project Madurai initiative to digitize ancient (and modern) Tamil literature. Since its launch, Project Madurai has released etexts of over 1000 important Tamil literary works, big and small, covering a wide time span (early Sangam Period classics) to works of contemporary authors), all genre texts and anthologies in poetry, prose, drama), without any preference for any one religious texts Project Madurai (includes core works of Tamil Saivaite, Vaishnavaite, Christian and Muslim authors) and of all regions (works of Indian as well as Sri Lankan authors).
- One of the founding members of INFITT Chair 2007–2009; Vice-chair 2004–2006; Member, Executive Committee 2000–2009, 2014-; chair, Conf. Program Committee for Tamil Internet Conference (1999 -2004, 2011)

== Awards ==
- Outstanding Scientist of Indian Origin, Chemical Research Society of India (CRSI), February 2012
- Sundara Ramasamy Award for Contributions to Tamil Computing/Tamil IT, Tamil Literary Garden, University of Toronto, 2008
- University of California, Berkeley Tamil Chair Award for "Taking Tamil to the e-World", Berkeley, 2009

== Selected publications ==
- Photochemistry in Microheterogeneous Systems, K. Kalyanasundaram, Academic Press, New York, ISBN 978-0-12-394995-0
- Photochemistry of Polypyridine and Porphyrin Complexes, K. Kalyanasundaram, Academic Press, London, 625 pages, 1992, ISBN 978-0123949929
- Kinetics and Catalysis in Microheterogeneous Systems, K. Kalyanasundaram and M. Grätzel, editors, Marcel Dekker, New York, Surfactant science Series, vol 38., 1991, ISBN 0-8247-8495-2
- Dye Sensitized Solar Cells. K. Kalyanasundaram, EPFL Press; CRC Press, Florida, USA, 2010, 604 pages, ISBN 9781439808665
- Photosensitization and Photocatalysis using Coordination Compounds, K. Kalyanasundaram and M. Grätzel, editors, Kluwer Academic Publishers, Dordrecht, 1993, 468 pages, ISBN 978-94-017-2626-9
