= Arbit Choudhury =

- A comic strip portraying Arbit Choudhury
- Author(s): Shubham Choudhury and Hemantkumar Jain
- Launch date: 2004
- Genre(s): Business school, Coming of age

Arbit Choudhury is a coming of age webcomic run in the format of a comic strip from India.

== Plot ==
The plot of each strip revolves around the protagonist named "Arbit Choudhury" who is an MBA student. Choudhury is a common Indian surname while the word "Arbit" refers to the arbitrary ways of the protagonist. The strip deals with the campus life of a B-school student, replete with jargon and has Arbit Choudhury making mockery of management concepts and theories. He is characterised as a student with big dreams and bigger mouth, studying at a leading business school. Each strip is carried in a single panel and is not serialised (that is, each strip is complete in itself).

== Development ==
The webcomic and its protagonist were created by Shubham Choudhury and Hemantkumar Jain in 2004, then students at NITIE, Mumbai. It was initially created to serve as a mascot to the online contest MastishK' 04, which is part of Prerana, the inter-collegiate youth festival of the institute. In the subsequent years, competitions were held among the students of various B-schools, to identify good ideas for the comic strip, in addition to the ideas generated by the creators themselves. The concept of a comic strip revolving around the life of a B-school student proved successful at the festival and this led to its transformation into a webcomic.

== Awards ==
Arbit Choudhury was awarded with the Manthan Award for demonstrating how ICT could be used as an effective marketing tool.
