= The Better India =

Indian digital media platform

- Formation: 2009
- Founder: Dhimant Parekh; Anuradha Kedia
- Founded at: Bangalore, India
- Type: Digital journalisms, Positive journalism
- Website: www.thebetterindia.com

The Better India News is an Indian digital media platform focused on positive stories.

== Background ==
In 2015, The Better India got ₹1 crore ($160,000) funding. More recently in 2018, The Better India raised an undisclosed amount funding from the Lok Foundation and also receives financial support from the Independent & Public Spirited Media Foundation. The Better India also receives advertisements and sponsorship for content.

The Better India shares content over various platforms to over 30 million people.

The Better India is run by Vikara Services Pvt Ltd, a company founded in 2008 and is based in Bengaluru, India led by husband and wife entrepreneurs Dhimant Parekh and wife Anuradha Parekh.

About 30 percent of its audience comes from outside of India with a majority of those being from the United States, United Kingdom and Singapore. Sponsored stories makes up eighty percent of their revenue.

== Controversies ==
In 2018, BBC released a research paper titled "Duty, Identity, Credibility: ‘Fake News’ and the ordinary citizen in India". In this, The Better India was accused of sharing fake news. After The Better India got in touch with BBC, BBC research’s lead author, Sanatanu Chakrabarti, acknowledged the mistake in a private email:

"We have looked into your concern and found that we made a human error when scanning a wide range of media for our report on fake news. The Better India should not have been included and we would like to apologise to you for this mistake. We have now amended the report..."

The Better India criticized BBC for not apologizing publicly and 'maligning years of [their] hard work".

== Recognition ==
- Manthan Award for "Best Alternative News Site" across South Asia.
- 2016: Marico Innovation Foundation (MIF) Award for Social Innovation for "showcasing positive news and social development news, showcases unsung heroes, change-makers and grass-root innovations catalyzing significant on-ground impact."

== See also ==
- Solutions journalism
