= Tamil 99 =

Tamil keyboard layout

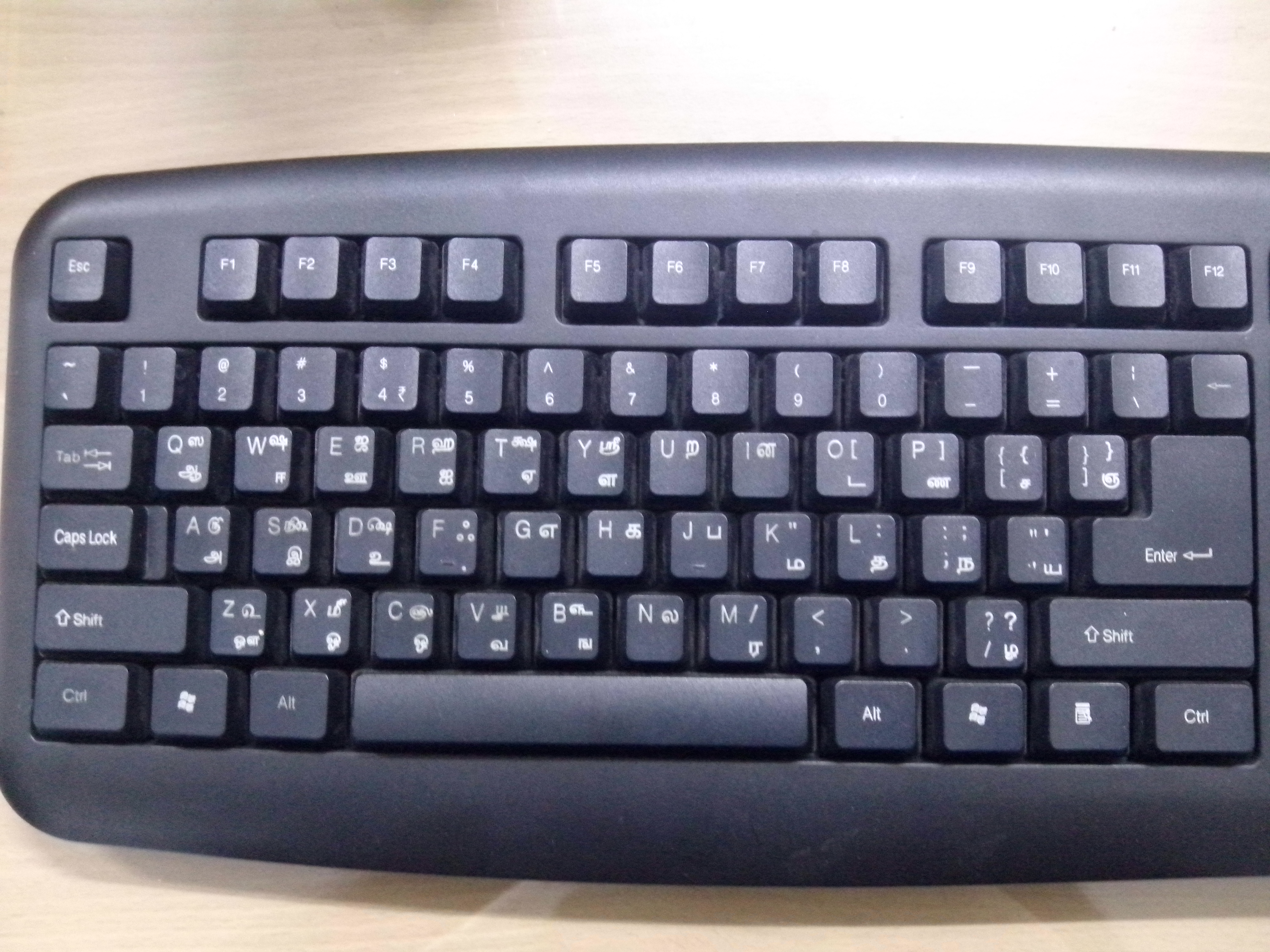
Tamil 99 keyboard

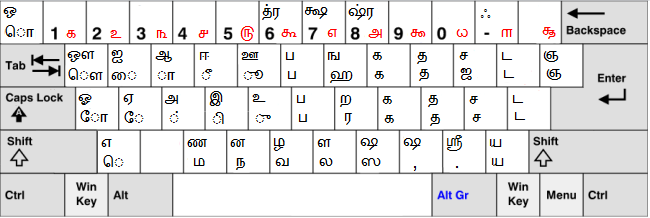
Tamil Inscript keyboard for comparison

Demo video on Tamil99 typing (in Tamil language)

Tamil 99 is a keyboard layout approved by the Tamil Nadu Government. The layout, along with several monolingual and bilingual fonts for use with the Tamil language, was approved by government order on 13 June 1999. Designed for use with a normal QWERTY keyboard, typing follows a consonant-vowel pattern. The arrangement of the characters allow for fast and simple typing for users familiar with the script.

== See also ==
- Tamil keyboard
- InScript keyboard
- InScript
- Keyboard layout
- Tamil (Unicode block)
- Tamil blogosphere
- Tamil All Character Encoding
