= ISO/IEC 8859-11 =

Thai character encoding, based on ASCII

ISO/IEC 8859-11:2001, Information technology — 8-bit single-byte coded graphic character sets — Part 11: Latin/Thai alphabet, is part of the ISO/IEC 8859 series of ASCII-based standard character encodings, first edition published in 2001. It is informally referred to as Latin/Thai. It is nearly identical to the national Thai standard TIS-620 (1990). The sole difference is that ISO/IEC 8859-11 allocates non-breaking space to code 0xA0, while TIS-620 leaves it undefined. (In practice, this small distinction is usually ignored.)

ISO-8859-11 is not a main registered IANA charset name despite following the normal pattern for IANA charsets based on the ISO 8859 series. However, it is defined as an alias of the close equivalent TIS-620 (which lacks the non-breaking space), and which can without problems be used for ISO/IEC 8859-11, since the no-break space has a code which was unallocated in TIS-620. Microsoft has assigned code page 28601 a.k.a. Windows-28601 to ISO-8859-11 in Windows. A draft had the Thai letters in different spots.

As with all varieties of ISO/IEC 8859, the lower 128 codes are equivalent to ASCII. The additional characters, apart from no-break space, are found in Unicode in the same order, only shifted from 0xA1 to U+0E01 and so forth.

The Microsoft Windows code page 874 as well as the code page used in the Thai version of the Apple Macintosh, MacThai, are variants of TIS-620 — incompatible with each other, however.

== Character set ==
ISO/IEC 8859-11
	0	1	2	3	4	5	6	7	8	9	A	B	C	D	E	F
0x																
1x																
2x	SP	!	"	#	$	%	&	'	(	)	*	+	,	-	.	/
3x	0	1	2	3	4	5	6	7	8	9	:	;	<	=	>	?
4x	@	A	B	C	D	E	F	G	H	I	J	K	L	M	N	O
5x	P	Q	R	S	T	U	V	W	X	Y	Z	[	\	]		_
6x	`	a	b	c	d	e	f	g	h	i	j	k	l	m	n	o
7x	p	q	r	s	t	u	v	w	x	y	z	{	|	}	~	
8x																
9x																
Ax	NBSP	ก	ข	ฃ	ค	ฅ	ฆ	ง	จ	ฉ	ช	ซ	ฌ	ญ	ฎ	ฏ
Bx	ฐ	ฑ	ฒ	ณ	ด	ต	ถ	ท	ธ	น	บ	ป	ผ	ฝ	พ	ฟ
Cx	ภ	ม	ย	ร	ฤ	ล	ฦ	ว	ศ	ษ	ส	ห	ฬ	อ	ฮ	ฯ
Dx	ะ	ั	า	ำ	ิ	ี	ึ	ื	ุ	ู	ฺ					฿
Ex	เ	แ	โ	ใ	ไ	ๅ	ๆ	็	่	้	๊	๋	์	ํ	๎	๏
Fx	๐	๑	๒	๓	๔	๕	๖	๗	๘	๙	๚	๛				

Code values D1, D4-DA, E7-EE are combining characters.

== Vendor extensions ==
=== Code page 874 (IBM) / 9066 ===
IBM code page 874 (CP874, IBM-874, x-IBM874), also known as Code page 9066 (IBM-9066), differs from ISO/IEC 8859-11 in only nine symbols shown boxed in the following table:

IBM code page 874/9066 (differences from ISO-8859-11)
	0	1	2	3	4	5	6	7	8	9	A	B	C	D	E	F
Ax	่	ก	ข	ฃ	ค	ฅ	ฆ	ง	จ	ฉ	ช	ซ	ฌ	ญ	ฎ	ฏ
Bx	ฐ	ฑ	ฒ	ณ	ด	ต	ถ	ท	ธ	น	บ	ป	ผ	ฝ	พ	ฟ
Cx	ภ	ม	ย	ร	ฤ	ล	ฦ	ว	ศ	ษ	ส	ห	ฬ	อ	ฮ	ฯ
Dx	ะ	ั	า	ำ	ิ	ี	ึ	ื	ุ	ู	ฺ	้	๊	๋	์	฿
Ex	เ	แ	โ	ใ	ไ	ๅ	ๆ	็	่	้	๊	๋	์	ํ	๎	๏
Fx	๐	๑	๒	๓	๔	๕	๖	๗	๘	๙	๚	๛	¢	¬	¦	NBSP

Differences from ISO 8859-11

=== Code page 1161 ===
Code page 1161 (CP1161, IBM-1161), is a variant of IBM code page 874. The only difference is the euro sign (€) in position DE_{hex} (222).

=== Code page 874 (Microsoft) / 1162 ===
Windows code page 874 (windows-874, MS874, x-windows-874), known as Code page 1162 (CP1162, IBM-1162) by IBM, is used by Microsoft Windows. It differs from ISO/IEC 8859-11 only by adding the nine symbols shown in the following table:

Code page 1162 (IBM) / 874 (Microsoft): difference from ISO-8859-11
	0	1	2	3	4	5	6	7	8	9	A	B	C	D	E	F
8x	€					…										
9x		‘	’	“	”	•	–	—								

Differences from ISO 8859-11

=== Mac OS Thai ===
This is the variant used on the Classic Mac OS.

Mac OS Thai
	0	1	2	3	4	5	6	7	8	9	A	B	C	D	E	F
8x	«	»	…	่	้	๊	๋	์	่	้	๊	๋	์	“	”	ํ
9x		•	ั	็	ิ	ี	ึ	ื	่	้	๊	๋	์	‘	’	
Ax	NBSP	ก	ข	ฃ	ค	ฅ	ฆ	ง	จ	ฉ	ช	ซ	ฌ	ญ	ฎ	ฏ
Bx	ฐ	ฑ	ฒ	ณ	ด	ต	ถ	ท	ธ	น	บ	ป	ผ	ฝ	พ	ฟ
Cx	ภ	ม	ย	ร	ฤ	ล	ฦ	ว	ศ	ษ	ส	ห	ฬ	อ	ฮ	ฯ
Dx	ะ	ั	า	ำ	ิ	ี	ึ	ื	ุ	ู	ฺ	WJ	ZWSP	–	—	฿
Ex	เ	แ	โ	ใ	ไ	ๅ	ๆ	็	่	้	๊	๋	์	ํ	™	๏
Fx	๐	๑	๒	๓	๔	๕	๖	๗	๘	๙	®	©				

Differences from ISO 8859-11

== See also ==
- LMBCS-11
