= Manthan Award =

South Asian internet content award

- Awarded for: Outstanding contributions in digital content creation
- Date: October 10, 2004
- Presented by: Digital Empowerment Foundation
- Website: manthanaward.org

The Manthan Award is an annual award for South Asia given in recognition of exceptional digital content creation. Nominations are accepted from the public and multiple awards are given in many categories. In 2011 The Hindu referred to the Manthan Award as "one of South Asia's biggest events in information and communications technology for development initiatives." The award is issued by the Digital Empowerment Foundation and was partly inspired by the World Summit Award. It was created on 10 October 2004 and originally restricted to India, but in 2008 was expanded to include other South Asian nations.

In some cases awards are given for content creation tools such as Azhagi, a component enabling text entry in Indic scripts.

== Winners ==
=== 2006 ===
- MouthShut.com

=== 2007 ===
- Arbit Choudhury

=== 2009 ===
- Samir Dash

=== 2010 ===
- Panjab Digital Library

=== 2011 ===
- The Better India for best alternative news site across South Asia.
- Liwal Distance School via Pashto TV for Category: E-EDUaCATION & LEARNING.
- Apprain Content Management Framework for Category: E-Infrastructure.

=== 2013 ===
- IndiaMart

=== 2014 ===
- Parikipandla Narahari

=== 2015 ===
- Paytm
- Pradhan Mantri Jan Dhan Yojana
- Xondhan e-Magazine
- Ofabee developed by Enfin Technologies for the category of eLearning and education Ofabee.com later got acquired by mykademy.com
- Feminism in India
