= Project Madurai =

Tamil language literature organization

Project Madurai (மதுரை தமிழ் இலக்கிய மின்தொகுப்புத் திட்டம்) is an open and voluntary initiative aimed at publishing free versions of ancient Tamil literature on the internet. Texts have been consistently published in both TSCII (Tamil Script Code for Information Interchange) since its launch in 1998 and Unicode formats from 2004. The leadership of the project is attributed to Dr. K. Kalyanasundaram, based in Lausanne, Switzerland, serving as the Project Leader, and Dr. P. Kumar Mallikarjunan, located in Blacksburg, VA, USA, as the Deputy Project Leader.

Project Madurai is one of several projects currently active on an international scale, endeavoring to digitize ancient literary works and make them available in electronic form. The electronic texts from this project are distributed in both HTML and PDF file formats.

== History ==
The Madurai project commenced with the utilization of Inaimadhi and Mayilai Tamil fonts. However, starting from 1999, mobile phones have been manufactured using the Tamil Script Code for Information Interchange (TSCII) within the Tamil-language Tamil database. These mobile phones are distributed on web pages and in PDF format. Moreover, since 2004, texts are also published in Unicode.

== Tools Used ==
This project uses a tool by the name of eKalappai(e-plough) to type Tamil letters using standard US-en 101 Keyboard.

== Awards ==
- In 2007 Project Madurai was awarded the Iyal Award from The Tamil Literary Garden for their contribution to Tamil Literature through Information Technology.
