= Thai (Unicode block) =

- Range: U+0E00..U+0E7F (128 code points)
- Plane: BMP
- Scripts: Thai (86 char.); Common (1 char.)
- Major alphabets: Thai; Northern Thai; Pali
- Assigned: 87 code points
- Unused: 41 reserved code points
- Source standards: Thai Industrial Standard 620-2529 and 620-2533

Unicode version history
- 1.0.0 (1991): 92 (+92)
- 1.0.1 (1992): 87 (-5)

Unicode documentation
- Code chart ∣ Web page
- Note: Five characters were removed from the Thai block in version 1.0.1 during the process of unifying with ISO 10646.

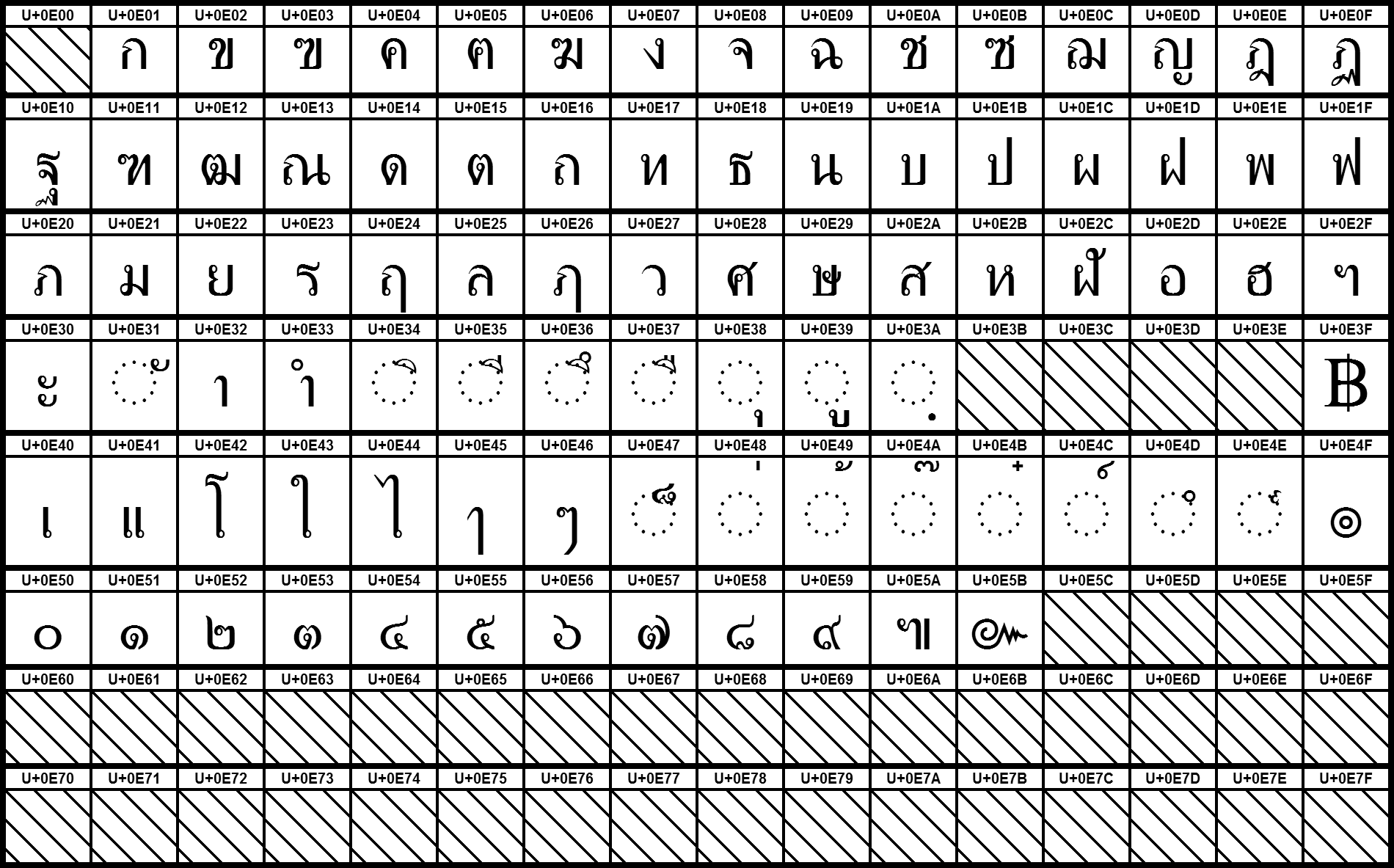
Graphical representation of the Thai Unicode block

Thai is a Unicode block containing characters for the Thai, Lanna Tai, and Pali languages. It is based on the Thai Industrial Standard 620-2533.

== Block ==
Thai^{[1]}^{[2]} Official Unicode Consortium code chart (PDF)
	0	1	2	3	4	5	6	7	8	9	A	B	C	D	E	F
U+0E0x		ก	ข	ฃ	ค	ฅ	ฆ	ง	จ	ฉ	ช	ซ	ฌ	ญ	ฎ	ฏ
U+0E1x	ฐ	ฑ	ฒ	ณ	ด	ต	ถ	ท	ธ	น	บ	ป	ผ	ฝ	พ	ฟ
U+0E2x	ภ	ม	ย	ร	ฤ	ล	ฦ	ว	ศ	ษ	ส	ห	ฬ	อ	ฮ	ฯ
U+0E3x	ะ	ั	า	ำ	ิ	ี	ึ	ื	ุ	ู	ฺ					฿
U+0E4x	เ	แ	โ	ใ	ไ	ๅ	ๆ	็	่	้	๊	๋	์	ํ	๎	๏
U+0E5x	๐	๑	๒	๓	๔	๕	๖	๗	๘	๙	๚	๛				
U+0E6x																
U+0E7x																
Notes: 1. As of Unicode version 16.0; 2. Grey areas indicate non-assigned code points

== History ==
The following Unicode-related documents record the purpose and process of defining specific characters in the Thai block:

Version	Final code points (Note: Proposed code points and characters names may differ from final code points and names)	Count	UTC ID	L2 ID	Document
1.0.0	U+0E01..0E3A, 0E3F..0E5B	87	UTC/1991-058		Whistler, Ken, Thai, Lao
1.0.0	U+0E01..0E3A, 0E3F..0E5B	87	UTC/1991-048B		Whistler, Ken (1991-03-27), "Thai, Lao", Draft Minutes from the UTC meeting #46 day 2, 3/27 at Apple
1.0.0	U+0E01..0E3A, 0E3F..0E5B	87	UTC/1992-xxx		Freytag, Asmus (1992-05-12), "B. Indic SC", Unconfirmed minutes for UTC Meeting #52, May 8, 1992 at Xerox
1.0.0	U+0E01..0E3A, 0E3F..0E5B	87		L2/02-017	Whistler, Ken (2002-01-14), Character Properties for avagrahas, etc.
