= Azhagi (software) =

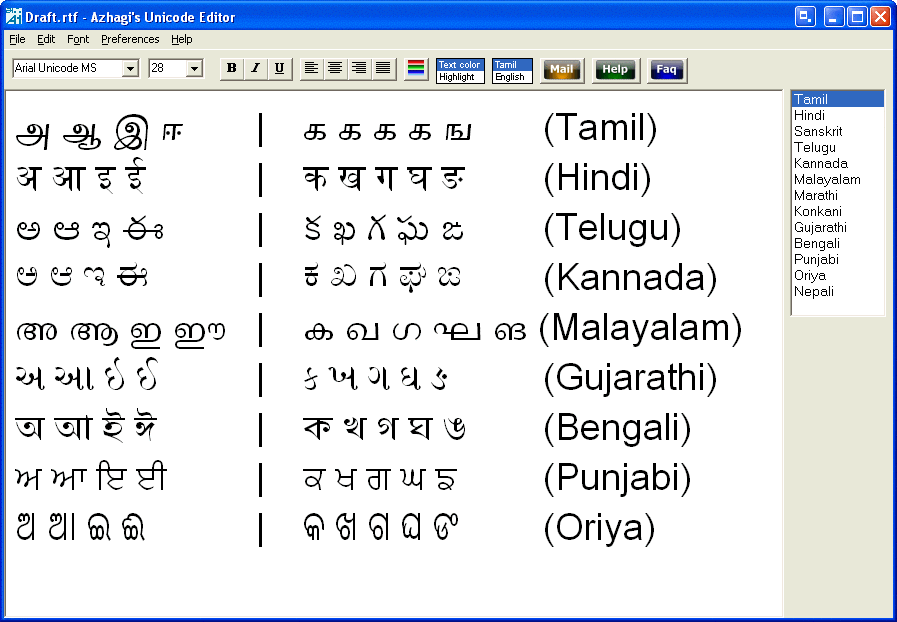
Azhagi Unicode Editor

Azhagi (Tamil: அழகி) is a freeware transliteration tool, which enables its users to type in a number of regional Indian languages, including Tamil, Hindi, and others, using an English keyboard. In 2002, The Hindu dubbed Azhagi as a tool that "stand[s] out" among various similar software "emerg[ing] nearly every other day". Since year 2000, Azhagi has provided support for Tamil transliteration; this was later expanded to nearly 13 Indian languages, featuring 16 total built-in languages as of the day of writing.

In 2006, Azhagi was the recipient of the Manthan Award of India's Digital Empowerment Foundation and the World Summit Award project, in the category Localization. In the same year Azhagi was identified as a "success story" by Microsoft's Bhashaindia.com Indic language computing site.

== Features ==
Azhagi is the first successful Tamil transliteration tool which has many users throughout the world. Azhagi helps the user to create and edit contents in several Indian languages including Tamil, Hindi, Sanskrit, Telugu, Kannada, Malayalam, Marathi, Konkani, Gujarati, Bengali, Punjabi, Oriya and Assamese without having to know how to type in these languages. Text of these languages can be produced only typing the phonetic equivalent of English. Azhagi can be embedded for direct typing text of these languages in applications apart from Notepad, including Microsoft products like MS Office, OpenOffice.org and also other applications all the web browsers.

Azhagi initially developed as a Tamil word processor having its own screen for typing contents in Tamil. The user can optionally select a dual screen or a single screen for transliteration. The Tamil text corresponding to the English text forming the phonetic equivalent of Tamil typed in the upper half of the screen is displayed in the lower half. This feature enables the user to ascertain the correctness of contents being typed. The single screen option can be chosen by users who have become familiar with the key mappings to be able to see larger portion of text than that seen in dual screen mode.

The mapping summary that lists the English alphabets to be typed to get every Tamil alphabet is presented in the form of a concise table in the Azhagi Screen. This guides the new user who is yet to become familiar with the key mappings in finding the correct for every alphabet. The text displayed in Azhagi screen is with TSCII encoding. A Unicode editor for typing Tamil text in UTF-8 encoding with a separate display screen comes together with Azhagi.

Azhagi has another novel application known as Azhagi+ that enables wider range of settings and options to the user.

1. Azhagi+ Enables typing in Indic languages in Windows XP in MS-Word, it doesn't require to enable Unicode explicitly.
2. It gives Portable Support so that one can use it from pen-drive itself
3. One can have one's own hotkey for any LFK (Language + Font + Keyboard Layout combination) (no need to be dependent on F10 which may not work in laptops if function key configurations are changed)
4. There is Dynamic in-built help for keymappings of all languages (no need to refer online help pages)
5. One can change existing key mappings in any manner for any LFK (Language + Font + Keyboard Layout combination) in an easy and straightforward manner - quite unique among the Indic computing
6. One can create one's own keyboard layout for any LFK.

== Android Version ==
In 2016, Azhagi has launched the Mobile App for Android users with the custom transliteration feature. Though this app is created based on Indic Keyboard, it supports both the transliteration and transcription.

== Development team ==
B. Vishwanathan, a software professional, developed Azhagi after he quit from Tata Consultancy Services due to illness. During 1999, the transliteration tools in Tamil had a lot of rough edges. Most importantly, it was not user-friendly. It was then, Viswanathan resolved to develop a user-friendly English-to-Tamil transliteration software. Later in 2000, Azhagi was released and he named the software Azhagi, to symbolise his wife's 'beautiful' heart.

== Support from users ==
Lot of websites, software, documents which uses the Tamil font make use of the Azhagi and it has support from the user and they are displaying their thanks giving note on their blogs and web pages. In addition to the transliteration tool, Azhagi also provides links to hundreds of free Tamil fonts in Unicode, TSCII, TAB and TAM format. It is recommended by lot of users and its popularity is also increased gradually.

== Awards and recognition ==
- B. Vishwanathan was awarded the Manthan Award in 2006, for the development of dual screen transliteration tool Azhagi.
- In July 2004, chennaionline described B. Vishwanathan as a computer expert for his invention of Azhagi.
- In November 2004, Nilacharal described Vishwanathan as Thamizh Valarkkum Arignar, which means, Tamil Developing Scholar for the invention of Azhagi.

== See also ==
- Google transliteration
- Google
