= Zero-width non-joiner =

Non-printing character that separates two normally joined characters

ISO keyboard symbol‌ for ZWNJ

A ZWNJ between the double-wide tilde and the acute accent centers the acute over the tilde, instead of over the eͤ, where it would appear otherwise: ⟨e̜ͤ͠‌́i̯⟩.

The zero-width non-joiner (ZWNJ, rendered: ‌; HTML entity: &zwnj; or &#8204;) is a non-printing character used in the computerization of writing systems that make use of ligatures. For example, in writing systems that feature initial, medial and final letter-forms, such as the Persian alphabet, when a ZWNJ is placed between two characters that would otherwise be joined into a ligature, it instead prevents the ligature and causes them to be printed in their final and initial forms, respectively. This is also an effect of a space character, but a ZWNJ is used when it is desirable to keep the characters closer together or to abut two morphemes that are part of a single word.

The ZWNJ is encoded in Unicode as U+200C ZERO WIDTH NON-JOINER (&zwnj;).

== Use of ZWNJ for correct typography ==
In certain languages, the ZWNJ is necessary for unambiguously specifying the correct typographic form of a character sequence.

Correct (with ZWNJ)			Incorrect			Meaning
Display	Pic‌ture	Code	Display	Picture	Code	Meaning
می‌خواهم		می&zwnj;خواهم (rendered from right to left): می&zwnj;خواهم	میخواهم		میخواهم	Persian 'I want to'
ساءين‌س		ساءين&zwnj;س (rendered from right to left): ساءين&zwnj;س	ساءينس		ساءينس	Malay 'science'
ۂسؠ‌تِنؠ		ۂسؠ&zwnj;تِنؠ (rendered from right to left): ۂسؠ&zwnj;تِنؠ	ۂسؠتِنؠ		ۂسؠتِنؠ	Kashmiri 'A female elephant'
הֱ‌ֽיֹות		הֱ&zwnj;ֽיֹות (rendered from right to left): הֱ&zwnj;ֽיֹות	הֱֽיֹות		הֱֽיֹות	Old Hebrew 'be'
Auf‌lage		Auf&zwnj;lage	Auflage		Auflage	German 'edition' (compound of "auf"+"Lage")
Brot‌zeit		Brot&zwnj;zeit	Brotzeit		Brotzeit	German (regional) '(kind of) snack' (compound noun "Brot"+"Zeit" = 'bread time'), shown in Fraktur
deaf‌ly		deaf&zwnj;ly	deafly		deafly	Not a compound of "dea"+"fly", but the adverb of "deaf"
श्रीमान्‌को		श्रीमान्&zwnj;को	श्रीमान्को		श्रीमान्को	In Nepali "of husband" or "of respected person" according as what "श्रीमान्" is used to represent (husband or respected person)
উদ্‌যাপন		উদ্&zwnj;যাপন	উদ্যাপন		উদ্যাপন	Bengali 'celebration'
अय्‌लाः		अय्&zwnj;लाः	अय्लाः		अय्लाः	Aila, a traditional alcoholic beverage, in Nepal Bhasa
హైద్‌రాబాదు		హైద్&zwnj;రాబాదు	హైద్రాబాదు		హైద్రాబాదు	Hyderabad in Telugu

The picture shows how the code looks when it is rendered correctly, and in every row the correct and incorrect pictures should be different. On a system which is not configured to display the Unicode correctly, the correct display and the incorrect one may look the same, or either of them may be significantly different from the corresponding picture.

In this Biblical Hebrew example, the placement of the meteg to the left of the segol is correct, which has a shva sign written as two vertical dots to denote short vowel. If a meteg were placed to the left of shva, it would be erroneous. In Modern Hebrew, there is no reason to use the meteg for spoken language, so it is rarely used in Modern Hebrew typesetting.

In German typography, ligatures may not cross the constituent boundaries within compounds. Thus, in the first German example, the prefix Auf- is separated from the rest of the word to prohibit the ligature fl. Similarly, in English, some argue ligatures should not cross morpheme boundaries. For example, in some words fly and fish are morphemes but in others they're not; therefore, by their reasoning, words like deaf‌ly and self‌ish (here shown with the non-joiner) should not have ligatures (respectively of fl and fi) while dayfly and catfish should have them.

Persian uses this character extensively for certain prefixes, suffixes and compound words. It is necessary for disambiguating compounds from non-compound words, which use a full space.

In the Jawi script of Malay, ZWNJ is used whenever more than one consonants are written at the end of any phrase (ساءين‌س, Malay for 'science' or sains in Latin script, pronounced /ˈsa.ɪns/.) It is used to signify that there are no vowels (specifically 'a' or 'ə') in between the two consonant letters as ساءينس would otherwise be pronounced either /ˈsa.ɪnas/ or /ˈsa.ɪnəs/. A space would separate the phrase into different words, where phrases such as ساءين س would now mean 'to sign the Arabic letter sin' (sain sin in Latin script.)

In Kashmiri written in the official modified Perso-Arabic script, the behavior of ؠ (Kashmiri Yeh) requires specific orthographic handling in digital text to maintain both visual and phonetic accuracy. This character indicates palatalization and possesses two principal typographic forms: the Gol Ye (with a diacritic ring) and the Taler Ye (a truncated form without the ring). Standard rendering protocols typically display the Taler form in word-final and isolated positions. However, these two forms are phonetically distinct and are often treated in pedagogical contexts as separate characters. The Taler Ye represents the palatalization of the preceding consonant [◌ʲ], whereas the Gol Ye in the medial position represents the palatalized vowel sound [ʲa]. In certain lexical contexts, such as شُپؠ‌یَن (Shopian), a medial Taler form is linguistically mandatory to preserve the correct pronunciation and spelling. Because standard digital shaping engines often default to the joined Gol form in initial and medial positions, the Zero Width Non-Joiner (ZWNJ) must be used to suppress this joining behavior. This ensures the character retains its correct Taler shape within a single word unit, fulfilling the precise orthographic conventions of the script.

== Use of ZWNJ to display alternative forms ==
Use of ZWNJ and ZWJ to select alternative forms of Devanagari, Tamil, Kannada, Sinhala and emoji.

In Indic scripts, insertion of a ZWNJ after a consonant either with a halant or before a dependent vowel prevents the characters from being joined properly:

In Devanagari, the characters क् and ष typically combine to form क्ष, but when a ZWNJ is inserted between them, क्‌ष (code: क्&zwnj;ष) is seen instead. Similarly, when using ZWNJ, द्म is seen as द्‌म (code: द्&zwnj;म), etc.

In Kannada, the characters ನ್ and ನ combine to form ನ್ನ, but when a ZWNJ is inserted between them, ನ್‌ನ is displayed. That style is typically used to write foreign words in Kannada script: "Facebook" is written as ಫೇಸ್‌ಬುಕ್, though it can be written as ಫೇಸ್ಬುಕ್. ರಾಜ್‌ಕುಮಾರ್ and ರಾಮ್‌ಗೊಪಾಲ್ are examples of other proper nouns that need ZWNJ.

To insert a ZWNJ in Kannada, use Shift-V on Linux (iBus, InScript). On Windows (InScript), you can produce a ZWNJ with Ctrl+Shift+2 or Alt+0157. For the LipikaIME on Mac, the caret returns a ZWNJ.

In Bengali, when the Bengali letter য occurs at the end of a consonant cluster—i.e., য preceded by a ◌্ (hôsôntô)—it appears in a special shape,, known as the য-ফলা (ja-phalā), such as in ক্য (ক ্ য). Thus, when we want to write উদ্‌যাপন (correct Bengali spelling for celebration), it becomes উদ্যাপন (which is incorrect). Here ZWNJ works. If we want to write উদ্‌যাপন, we have to write in the following sequence (code: উদ্&zwnj;যাপন), then we will get the proper rendering and the correct spelling. In Bengali, the hôsôntô is used for making any conjuncts and phalās (such as ra-phalā, ba-phalā etc). Where the hôsôntô needs to be displayed explicitly, it is required to insert ZWNJ after the hôsôntô.

Also in Bengali, when the Bengali letter র occurs at the beginning of a consonant cluster—i.e., র succeeded by a hôsôntô—it appears in a special shape, known as the রেফ (reph). Thus, the sequence র ্ য is rendered by default as র্য. When the য-ফলা shape needs to be retained rather than the রেফ shape, the ZWNJ U+200D ZERO WIDTH JOINER (&zwj;) is inserted right after র, i.e., র&zwnj;্য to render র‍্য. র‍্য is commonly used for loanwords from English such as র‍্যাম (RAM), র‍্যান্ডম (random) etc.

== Symbol ==
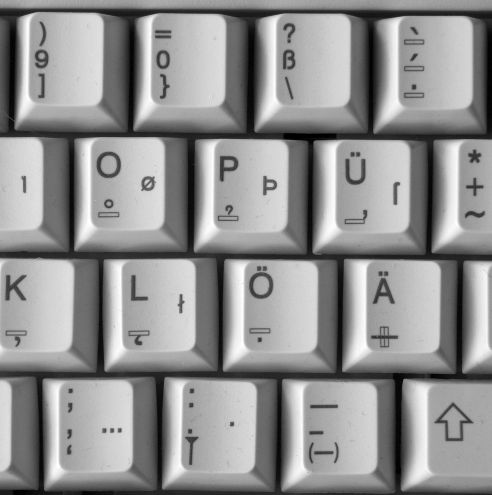
German T2 keyboard (detail), showing the ZWNJ symbol on the "." key

The symbol to be used on keyboards which enable the input of the ZWNJ directly is standardized in Amendment 1 (2012) of ISO/IEC 9995-7:2009 "Information technology – Keyboard layouts for text and office systems – Symbols used to represent functions" as symbol number 81, and in IEC 60417 "Graphical Symbols for use on Equipment" as symbol no. IEC 60417-6177-2.

== Usage in Microsoft Word ==
In Microsoft Word's special-character insertion function, the zero-width non-joiner is called a "No-Width Optional Break".

== See also ==
- Zero-width joiner
- Zero-width space
- Word divider
