= INFITT =

- Founded: July 23, 2000
- Type: International Organization
- Purpose: Information Technology, Tamil language
- Headquarters: California, USA
- Origins: Established during Tamil Internet 2000 Conference in Singapore
- Region served: Worldwide
- Method: Conferences, Publications, Government and Industry liaison
- Chairman: T. Thavaruban
- Website: www.infitt.org

The International Forum for Information Technology in Tamil (INFITT, read In-Fit; Tamil: உலகத் தமிழ் தகவல் தொழில்நுட்ப மன்றம் (உத்தமம்)) is a non-profit, non-governmental nodal organization for collaboration among professionals, enthusiasts, government entities, and other international organizations working in the development and standardization of information technology for Tamil language. It has active liaison and collaboration with government entities in India, Sri Lanka, Singapore and Malaysia, and industry bodies like Unicode Consortium.

INFITT conducts regular technical conferences related to Tamil computing, which attract active participation from international researchers and professionals. These Tamil Internet Conferences (aka TIC) are conducted in Tamil speaking countries like India, Singapore and Malaysia, or international institutions that pioneer in Tamil research. Past conferences have been organized in association with governments of Tamil Nadu and Malaysia, and universities of Singapore, California, Pennsylvania and Cologne.

== History ==
There had been active interaction between various technology professionals and Tamil scholars over the internet well before the creation of INFITT. Some of this collaboration was in standardizing a keyboard layout more suited for computers, and defining an 8-bit encoding scheme to work on then current operating systems which didn't yet support Unicode. International technical workshops and conferences were already being conducted regularly, with patronage from government or universities. The idea of a formal international entity was mooted in private communications among key members preparing for Tamil Internet 2000 Conference and a constitution was drafted. Establishment of the organization was announced during that conference with the participants of the conference forming the initial general body.

=== Tamil Internet Conferences ===
Tamil Internet Conferences bring together scholars and researchers working in Tamil Information Technology from across the world for active discussion and learning. The main aspect of the conferences are the technical section with paper presentations and group discussions. Some conferences held in locations with significant Tamil population may also have two additional sections, namely, Public Gallery (மக்கள் அரங்கம்), and Exhibition. Typically, participation in technical conferences only would require paid registration.

The gallery is used for showcasing recent developments in technology. Educational sessions and booths help the visiting public in enabling Tamil in their devices, and learn about job and business opportunities in Tamil computing.

The table below lists 3 precursor events conducted before the formation of INFITT, in the years 1997, 1999 and 2000. INFITT was established during the conference in 2000, held in Singapore.

Conf. №	Name	Dates	Location	Co-Host	Theme	Comment
1	TamilNet'97	17–18 May	National University of Singapore (NUS), Singapore	NUS and National Institute of Education of Nanyang Technological University	International Symposium for Tamil Information Processing and Resources on the Internet	Before formation of INFITT
2	TamilNet'99	7–8 February	Image Auditorium, Chennai, Tamil Nadu	Government of Tamil Nadu	Keyboard and 8-bit Encoding standardizations	Before formation of INFITT
3	Tamil Internet 2000	22–24 July	Suntec Convention Centre, Singapore	Tamil Internet Steering Committee, Institute of Policy Studies, NUS		Birth of INFITT
4	Tamil Internet Conference 2001	26–28 August	Putra World Trade Center, Kuala Lumpur, Malaysia	Malaysian Indian Congress	Pathways to Progress	Birth of Tamil Heritage Foundation
5	Tamil Internet Conference 2002	27–29 September	San Francisco Bay Area, USA	Center for South Asia Studies and Chair for Tamil Studies, University of California, Berkeley	Bridging the Digital Divide	
6	Tamil Internet Conference 2003	22–24 August	Chennai, India	Anna University & Tamil Virtual University	IT for Education in Tamil	
7	Tamil Internet Conference 2004	11–12 December	NUS, Singapore	Institute of Policy Studies		Technical conference only
8	Tamil Internet Conference 2009	23–25 October	University of Cologne, Germany	Institute of Indology and Tamil Studies	கணிவழி காண்போம் தமிழ்	
9	Tamil Internet Conference 2010	23–27 June	CODISSIA Trade Fair Complex, Coimbatore, India	Government of Tamil Nadu	இணையம் வளர்க்கும் தமிழ்	Co-organized with World Classical Tamil Conference
10	Tamil Internet Conference 2011	17–19 June	Philadelphia, USA	University of Pennsylvania		
11	Tamil Internet Conference 2012	28–30 December	Chidambaram, India	Annamalai University	Tamil Computing for Mobiles and Tablets	
12	Tamil Internet Conference 2013	15–18 August	Kuala Lumpur, Malaysia	University of Malaya	Tamil Computing for Mobile Devices	
13	Tamil Internet Conference 2014	19–21 September	Pondicherry, India	University of Pondicherry	Natural Language Processing	
14	Tamil Internet Conference 2015	30 May – 1 June	Singapore	SIM University	Natural Language Processing and Mobile Computing	
15	Tamil Internet Conference 2016	9-11 September	Dindigul, India	Gandhigram Rural Institute	Tamil Computing	
16	Tamil Internet Conference 2017	25-27 August	Toronto, Canada	University of Toronto, Scarborough Campus	Deep Learning and Data Science	Co-sponsored by University of Waterloo Centre for Pattern Recognition and Machine Intelligence
17	Tamil Internet Conference 2018	6-8 July	Coimbatore, India	Tamilnadu Agricultural University, Coimbatore, India	Intelligent Search Engines for Tamil	
18	Tamil Internet Conference 2019	20-22 September	Chennai, India	Anna University, Chennai, India	Tamil Robotics and Language Processing	
19	Tamil Internet Conference (Virtual) 2020	11-13 December	Colombo, Sri Lanka	Moratuwa University, Sri Lanka	Virtual Conference	
20	Tamil Internet Conference (Virtual) 2021	2-5 December	Tamilnadu, India	Bharathiar University, Coimbatore Tamil Nadu & University of Hyderabad, Hyderabad, India with CIIL& CIT	Virtual Conference	
21	Tamil Internet Conference 2022	15-17 December	Thanjavur, India	Tamil University & Periyar Maniammai Institute of Science & Technology	Tamil in Industry 5.0	

=== Working Groups ===
Working groups are the primary mode of coordination for technical discussion within INFITT. Some of the working groups may be time bound and might close on completion of their objective, while others continue to function to facilitate ongoing discussions and developments. There were a total of 8 working groups formed so far in INFITT.

№	Name	Started	Status
WG01	Tamil Glossary of Technical Terms		Inactive
WG02	Tamil Unicode		Active
WG03	Tamil Internet Domain Names		Inactive
WG04	Tamil 8-bit Glyph Encoding		Closed
WG05	Tamil Transliteration		Inactive
WG06	Tamil OCR		Inactive
WG07	Tamil Linux		Inactive
WG08	TUNE (Alternate 16 bit encoding)		Closed

=== Events & workshops ===
INFITT organizes educational workshops focused to specific target audience. These workshops range from basic training in using computers in Tamil language, to advanced workshops on research topics. These are often organized in coordination with colleges and universities.

== Organizational structure ==
INFITT are governed by the 9-member executive committee (EC) which takes all major decisions. It is headed by a chair who holds the office for a one-year term, who is assisted by a vice chair, executive director and a treasurer. The EC is elected to hold office for a two-year term by the general council.

The general council consists of 54 elected members. Members of GC are elected by the general body every two years. GC has proportional representation for regions and countries with significant Tamil population. The general body consists of all registered members of the organization.

INFITT also has regional chapters for handling activities in specific regions. Currently there are two active regional chapters in India and Malaysia. There are also student chapters within major universities.

== Membership ==
Membership of INFITT is open to individuals and organizations. Membership doesn't have any restrictions other than to abide by the rules of the organization and payment of annual membership fee.

Registered students may become members without paying any registration fee. Student members will enjoy similar benefit as regular members except the voting rights in General Council elections.

== Collaborations ==
INFITT regularly collaborates with various industry organizations and government bodies in setting standards, facilitating development and promoting usage. INFITT is a liaison member of Unicode Consortium, and worked to develop the Unicode standard in Tamil language.
