= Zero-width joiner =

Non-printing character used in computerized typesetting

ISO keyboard symbol for ZWJ

The zero-width joiner (ZWJ, /ˈzwɪdʒ/; rendered: ‍; HTML entity: &zwj; or &#8205;) is a non-printing character used in the computerized typesetting of writing systems in which the shape or positioning of a grapheme depends on its relation to other graphemes (complex scripts), such as the Arabic script or any Indic script. Sometimes the Roman script is to be counted as complex, e.g. when using a Fraktur typeface. When placed between two characters that would otherwise not be connected, a ZWJ causes them to be printed in their connected forms.

The exact behaviour of the ZWJ varies depending on whether the use of a conjunct consonant or ligature (where multiple characters are shown with a single glyph) is expected by default; for instance, it suppresses the use of conjuncts in Devanagari (whilst still allowing the use of the individual joining form of a dead consonant, as opposed to a halant form as would be required by the zero-width non-joiner), but induces the use of conjuncts in Sinhala (which does not use them by default). Similarly to Sinhala, when a ZWJ is placed between two emoji characters (or interspersed between multiple), it can result in a single glyph being shown, such as the family emoji, made up of two adult emoji and one or two child emoji.

In some cases, such as the second Devanagari example below, the ZWJ can be used to display a joining form in isolation, when included after the character and combining halant code.

The character's code point is U+200D ZERO WIDTH JOINER (&zwj;). In the InScript keyboard layout for Indian languages, it is typed by the key combination Ctrl+⇧ Shift+1. However, many layouts use the position of QWERTY's ']' key for this character.

== Examples ==
Use of ZWNJ and ZWJ to select alternative forms of Devanagari, Tamil, Kannada, Sinhala and emoji

Bengali
Character sequence	Appearance
[ra র] [virāma ্ ] [ya য]	র্য
[ra র] [ZWJ] [virāma ্ ] [ya য]	র‍্য

Devanagari
Character sequence	Appearance
[ka क] [virāma ्]	क्
[ka क] [virāma ्] [ZWJ]	क्‍
[ka क] [virāma ्] [ṣa ष]	क्ष
[ka क] [virāma ्] [ZWJ] [ṣa ष]	क्‍ष

Kannada
Character sequence	Appearance
[ra ರ‍] [virāma ್] [ka ಕ]	ರ್ಕ
[ra ರ‍] [ZWJ] [virāma ್] [ka ಕ]	ರ‍್ಕ

Sinhala
Character sequence	Appearance
[śa ශ] [virāma ්] [ra ර]	ශ්ර
[śa ශ] [virāma ්] [ZWJ] [ra ර]	ශ්‍ර

Malayalam (Until Unicode 5.0; in later editions, specific code points may be allotted)
Character sequence	Appearance
[Na ണ] [virāma ്] [ZWJ]	ണ്‍
[na ന] [virāma ്] [ZWJ]	ന്‍
[ra ര] [virāma ്] [ZWJ]	ര്‍
[la ല] [virāma ്] [ZWJ]	ല്‍
[La ള] [virāma ്] [ZWJ]	ള്‍

Emoji
Character sequence	Appearance	Description
[Man] [ZWJ] [Woman] [ZWJ] [Boy]	👨‍👩‍👦	Family: Man, Woman, Boy
[Black flag] [ZWJ] [Skull and Crossbones]	🏴‍☠️	Pirate Flag
[Runner] [Emoji Modifier Fitzpatrick Type-1-2] [ZWJ] [Female Sign]	🏃🏻‍♀️	Woman Running: Light Skin Tone
[Runner] [Emoji Modifier Fitzpatrick Type-6] [ZWJ] [Female Sign]	🏃🏿‍♀️	Woman Running: Dark Skin Tone
[Man] [ZWJ] [Red hair]	👨‍🦰	Man: Red Hair
[Person] [ZWJ] [Sheaf of rice]	👨‍🌾	Farmer

== See also ==
- Word joiner
- Zero-width non-joiner
