= Tamil blogosphere =

The Tamil blogosphere is the online community of Tamil-language weblogs that are a part of the larger Indian blogosphere. The Tamil blogosphere has a considerable number of contributors from Sri Lanka and Singapore, and is one of the largest blogospheres resident in India.

== Tamil language typing tools ==
Early adopters used different software to type in Tamil. Earlier versions of Tamil typing software had each its own implementation of the Tamil keyboard, complete with proprietary fonts and encodings. Later on, a standardized encoding was agreed upon and newer iterations of Tamil software (such as Azhagi, NHM writer, The tamilsg editor, & Google transliteration) use Unicode.

== Distribution and usage ==
Earlier on, the majority of Tamil bloggers were from outside India and Sri Lanka. Nowadays, Tamil people from their homeland have started to write blogs. A considerable number of bloggers are writers.

== Content ==
Content is mostly related to cinema, culture, history, politics, philosophy, personal experience, and travel. Considerable number of blogs exist devoted to technology and religion. The majority of these bloggers write the posts in the first person.

Even though most bloggers are based outside India, Tamil blogs featured content related to politics in India rather than the country they were blogging from.
