= Google Input Tools =

Set of typing tools by Google

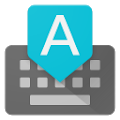
- Developer: Google
- Initial release: July 2012; 13 years ago
- Website: www.google.com/inputtools/

Google Input Tools, also known as Google IME, is a set of input method editors by Google for 22 languages, including Amharic, Arabic, Bengali, Chinese, Greek, Gujarati, Hindi, Japanese, Kannada, Malayalam, Marathi, Nepali, Persian, Punjabi, Russian, Sanskrit, Serbian, Tamil, Telugu, Tigrinya, and Urdu. It is a virtual keyboard that allows users to type in their local language text directly in any application without the hassle of copying and pasting.

Available as a Chrome extension, it was also available as a desktop application for Microsoft Windows until it was removed in May 2018.

== Google transliteration ==
Google's service for Indic languages was previously available as an online text editor, named Google Indic Transliteration. Other language transliteration capabilities were added (beyond just Indic languages) and it was renamed simply Google transliteration. Later on, because of its steady rise in popularity, it was released as Google Transliteration IME for offline use in December 2009.

It works on a dictionary-based phonetic transliteration approach, which means that whatever you type in Latin characters, it matches the characters with its dictionary and transliterates them. It also gives suggestions for matching words.

Google's service for Indic languages was first launched as an online text editor, Google Indic Transliteration, designed to allow users to input text in native scripts using Latin characters. Due to the increasing demand for such tools across multiple language groups, it expanded its support to other scripts and was later renamed simply Google Transliteration. By December 2009, an offline version of this tool was made available under the name Google Transliteration IME.

For transliteration between scripts, there was, until July 2011, a separate service named Google Script Converter.

== See also ==
- Google Pinyin
- Google Japanese Input
- Azhagi (software)
