= InScript keyboard =

Standard keyboard layout for Indian scripts

InScript (short for Indic Script) is the decreed standard keyboard layout for Indian scripts using a standard 104- or 105-key layout. This keyboard layout was standardised by the Government of India for inputting text in languages of India written in Brahmic scripts, as well as the Santali language, written in the non-Brahmic Ol Chiki script. It was developed by the Indian Government and supported by several public and private organisations. This is the standard keyboard for 12 Indian scripts including Devanagari, Bengali, Gujarati, Gurmukhi, Kannada, Malayalam, Odia, Tamil and Telugu, among others. The InScript layout is built into most of the major operating systems including Windows (2000 and later), and most Linux and Mac OS systems. It is also available in some mobile phones and (in the case of Tamil and Hindi) in Apple's iOS 5 and higher. It is available in Android 4.0 (Ice Cream Sandwich) and higher but removed from latest Google Keyboard application (Gboard) and Google Indic Keyboard. It is also available for Windows Mobile 5.x and 6.x from third parties.

== Keyboard layout ==
The Devanagari InScript laptop keyboard layout to type Hindi, Marathi and Sanskrit in Windows OS based computers

Bengali InScript keyboard layout

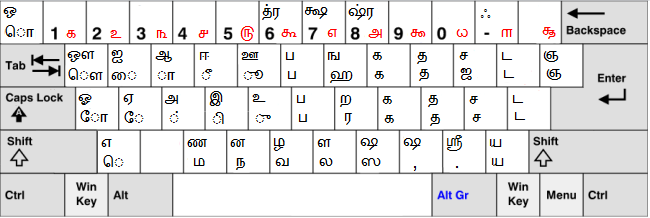
Tamil InScript keyboard layout

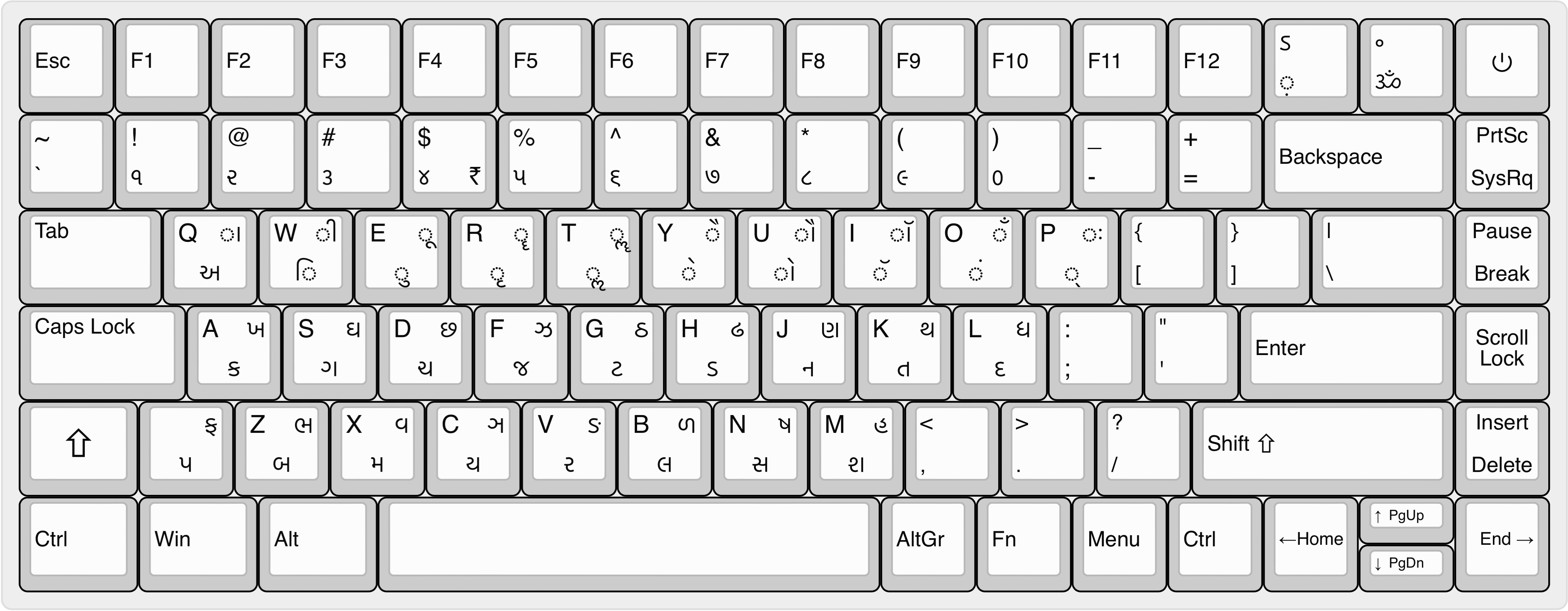
The standard Gujarati InScript bilingual keyboard layout to type Gujǎrātī Lipi in Windows OS based computers

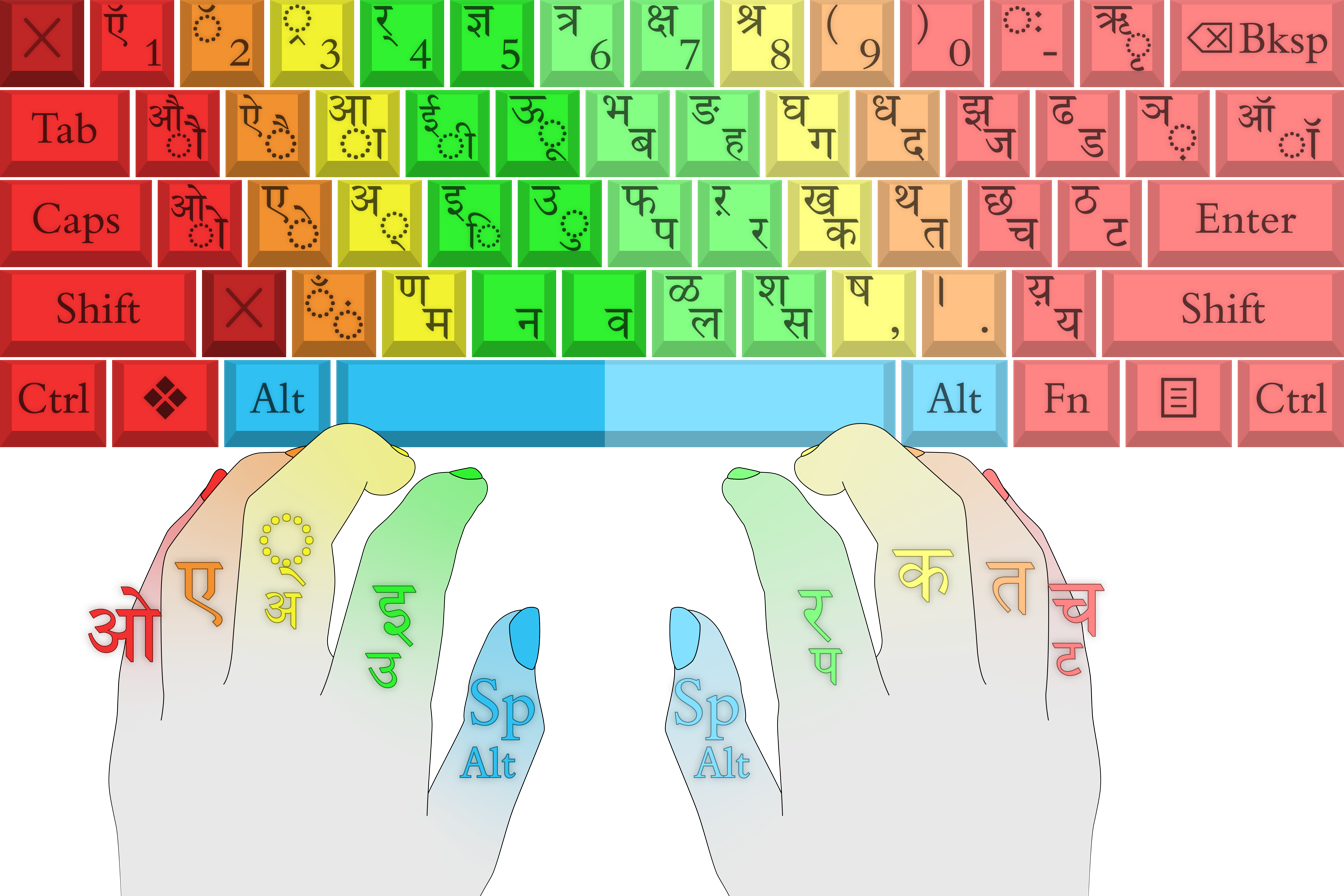
A touch typing guide for the Hindi InScript keyboard layout on Windows 11

Devanagari InScript bilingual keyboard layout has a common layout for all the Indian scripts. Most Indic scripts have the same phonetic character order. A person who knows InScript typing in one script can type in any other Indic script using dictation even without knowledge of that script.

== History ==
The first InScript keyboard was standardised in 1986 under the auspices of the DOE (Department of Electronics at the Ministry of Communications & Information Technology). It was subsequently revised in 1988 by a DOE committee and modifications were made to accommodate nuqta extended keys as well as to add certain matras. The last revision to the BIS document was made in 1992, after which the document has not undergone any revision. This was partly because very few new characters were added to the ISCII code-set and these if at all were handled by extending and generating the character by the use of the nuqta. The BIS document specifically mentions such characters. Hence the InScript keyboards were felt to be self-sufficient. With the advent of Unicode, a few new characters were added to each code-page; characters for which the BIS document had not made any provision. In addition Unicode introduced the concept of ZWJ and ZWNJ, as well as that of normalisation.

These new features had marked repercussions on storage as well as inputting and an urgent need was felt for a revision whereby each new character introduced in Unicode would be accommodated on the keyboard and a uniform manner of entering data as well as storing data would be devised. With this urgent requirement in mind, CDAC GIST involved in the initiative all major players: IBM, Microsoft and Red Hat Linux and hence in 2008, a joint meeting was organised between CDAC GIST and senior representatives of these multi-nationals to devise a common and uniform strategy for inputting and equally important for storage. This would enable the creation of one single keyboard and more importantly one single storage, essential for all high-end NLP. A task-force was created with two major briefs:

1. Evolve a design policy which would retain the major features of the existing Inscript keyboard.
2. Accommodate on the keyboard every character proposed in Unicode 5.1 and also ensure that the design could accommodate all future additions. This resulted in a document by the joint deliberations of all these companies described as proposal for “Enhanced InScript keyboard layout 5.1”.

== See also ==
- Tamil 99
