= Tamil =

Tamil may refer to:

== Peoples ==
- Tamils, an ethno-linguistic group native to India, Sri Lanka, and some other parts of Asia
  - Sri Lankan Tamils, Tamil people native to Sri Lanka.
  - Myanmar or Burmese Tamils, Tamil people who reside in Burma/Myanmar
  - Tamil Malaysians, Tamil people who have settled in Malaysia
  - Singapore Tamils, Tamil people who have settled in Singapore
  - Tamil diaspora, descendants of Tamil immigrants living outside of India and Sri Lanka

== Language ==
- Tamil language, the native language of the Tamils
- Tamiloid languages, Dravidian languages related to Tamil
- Tamil dialects, geographical variations of Tamil
- Tamil script, the writing system of the Tamil language
  - Tamil (Unicode block), a block of Tamil characters in Unicode
- Tamil Thai, Tamil language personified as a goddess
  - Tamil Thai Valthu (disambiguation), state songs of Tamil Nadu and Puducherry dedicated to the goddess

== Culture and history ==
- Tamil culture, culture of the Tamil people
- Tamil cuisine, cuisine of the Tamil people
- Tamil nationalism (disambiguation)
- Tamil genocide, violence against the Tamil population during the Sinhala–Tamil conflict beginning 1956
- Tamil cinema (disambiguation)
  - Tamil cinema, Tamil-language cinema also known as Kollywood
  - Thamizh, a 2002 Indian Tamil-language film starring Prashanth
- Tamil News, a daily Tamil-language television news program in Tamil Nadu, India

== Locations ==
- Tamil Nadu, one of the 28 states in India
- Tamil or Tomil, a municipality in Yap, Federated States of Micronesia
- Tamilakam, a historical region in ancient southern India
- Tamil Eelam, a proposed independent state in the northern and eastern regions of Sri Lanka

== Other uses ==
- Tamil Wikipedia, Tamil-language edition of Wikipedia
