= Bollywood (disambiguation) =

Bollywood is a colloquial term for Hindi cinema.

Bollywood may also refer to:

- Cinema of India in general
- Bollywood (tree), any of a number of trees
- "Bollywood" (song), 2010 single by Liz Phair
- MBC Bollywood, a channel of the Dubai-based Middle East Broadcasting Centre with a focus on Bollywood films

== See also ==
- Bollywood/Hollywood, a 2002 Canadian film
- Bollywood Film Festival, an annual film festival of Prague, Czechia
- Bollywood & Beyond (disambiguation)
- Tollywood (disambiguation), including cinema of India
- Kollywood (disambiguation), including cinema of India
- Pollywood (disambiguation), including cinema of India
- Mollywood (disambiguation), including cinema of India
- Hollywood (disambiguation)
- Nollywood (disambiguation)
- Bolly (disambiguation)
- Wood (disambiguation)
