= Melattur, Tamil Nadu =

Melattur Unnathapuram Achyutapuram
- town panchayat
- Location in Tamil Nadu, India
- Coordinates: 10.86°N 79.25°E
- Country: India
- State: Tamil Nadu
- District: Thanjavur

Population (2001)
  - Total: 7,815

Languages
  - Official: Tamil
- Time zone: UTC+5:30 (IST)
- Postal code: 614301

Melattur is a panchayat town in Thanjavur district in the Indian state of Tamil Nadu. It is located 18 kilometres from the town of Thanjavur. It is the origin of the Melattur style of Bharatanatyam founded by Mangudi Dorairaja Iyer and a series of dance-drama performances called the Bhagavatha Melas.

== Demographics ==
As of 2001 India census, Melattur had a population of 7815. Males constitute 50% of the population and females 50%. Melattur has an average literacy rate of 66%, higher than the national average of 59.5%: male literacy is 74%, and female literacy is 59%. In Melattur, 12% of the population is under 6 years of age.

== History ==
Inscriptions at the largest Shiva temple in Melattur indicate that the village might have existed as early as the times of Vikrama Chola who lived in 12th century AD. Earlier known as Nritta Vinoda Valanadu, the village was rechristened as Unnathapuri in honor of Unnathapureswarar, the presiding deity of the temple and the form in which Lord Shiva was worshipped in Melattur.

When the Vijayanagar Empire fell at the Battle of Talikota in 1565, there were a prominent exodus of artistes and prominent Hindu citizens to the south. Achyuthappa Nayak of Thanjavur, a vassal of the Vijayanagar kings granted the village of Unnathapuri near Thanjavur to 501 families of Kuchipudi dancers who were a part of the exodus. The village was subsequently renamed as Achyutapuram and eventually as Melattur with the passage of time. The Kuchipudi dancers preserved their ancestral tradition and gave regular performances. This eventually gave rise to the Bhagavatha Melas as well as the unique style of Bharatanatyam which evolved here.

During the reign of the Maratha king Tukkoji, an exodus of people from Atthigiri (Kanchipuram) migrated south and settled in Melattur. They built the Varadaraja Perumal temple at the north-western corner of the Agraharam and introduced Vaishnavism in the village and surrounding areas.

Virabhadra, the scholar who introduced thillana in the art of Bharatanatyam hailed from Melattur.

== Bhagavatha Mela ==
The main tourist attraction of Melattur are the Bhagavatha Melas, a series of festivities that mark the festival of Narasimha Jayanthi or the birth of Lord Narasimha. The Bhagavatha Melas comprise dramas and dance performances. The dialogues and songs are mostly in Telugu.

The earliest recorded celebration of the Bhagavatha Mela was in the year 1888. However, the mela has been held uninterruptedly only since 1938. In earlier times, the Mela used to be held in the five nearby villages of Soolamangalam, Saliyamangalam, Nallur, Oothukadu and Teperumanallur apart from Melattur. But nowadays, the mela is held only in Melattur, Tepperumanallur and Saliyamangalam.

The mela is held for a week during which the dramas Kamsa Vadham, Sathya Harischandra, Hari Hara Leela Vilasam and Sita Kalyanam are enacted. The drama Sathya Harischandra based on the story of Harishchandra is so replete with expression that it occasionally moves one to tears. The melas culminate with the drama Prahlada Charitram enacted on Narasimha Jayanthi. The highlight of the drama is the climax scene in which the actor playing the part of Narasimha supposedly becomes possessed by the spirit of Narasimha and charges at Hiranyakashyap in murderous rage. The actor in the role of Narasimha had to be restrained by bodyguards at the venue for this purpose.

== Bharatanatyam ==
A classical Bharatanatyam performance is an indispensable part of a Bhagavatha Mela. However, a unique style of Bharatanatyam is practised by the Melattur dancers. The distinct features of the Melattur style of Bharatanatyam are:

1. Natural (spontaneous) and highly expressive abhinaya{Tamil}
2. Largest amplitude of movements, which requires a higher degree of flexibility
3. Extensive use of kshepa (throw of limbs) and recaka.
4. Emphasis on sringara bhakti
  Tamil^{[1]}^{[2]} Official Unicode Consortium code chart (PDF)
  	0	1	2	3	4	5	6	7	8	9	A	B	C	D	E	F
  U+0B8x			ஂ	ஃ		அ	ஆ	இ	ஈ	உ	ஊ				எ	ஏ
  U+0B9x	ஐ		ஒ	ஓ	ஔ	க				ங	ச		ஜ		ஞ	ட
  U+0BAx				ண	த				ந	ன	ப				ம	ய
  U+0BBx	ர	ற	ல	ள	ழ	வ	ஶ	ஷ	ஸ	ஹ					ா	ி
  U+0BCx	ீ	ு	ூ				ெ	ே	ை		ொ	ோ	ௌ	்		
  U+0BDx	ௐ							ௗ								
  U+0BEx							௦	௧	௨	௩	௪	௫	௬	௭	௮	௯
  U+0BFx	௰	௱	௲	௳	௴	௵	௶	௷	௸	௹	௺					
  Notes 1.As of Unicode version 17.0 2.Grey areas indicate non-assigned code points
5. Emphasis on crisp adavus, accuracy of jathis/ gathis{Tamil}
6. Fluid variations of patterned korvais{Tamil}
7. Dramatic elements (characterisation)
8. Original methods of application of principles of "loka dharmi" and "natya dharmi"{Tamil}

== Other tourist attractions ==
The agraharam at Melattur is surrounded by a Ganapathy temple and a Draupadi temple apart from the Shiva temple and Perumal temple. There is also a temple dedicated to Lord Ayyanar situated on the outskirts of the village. The vegetation comprises lush green paddy fields and coconut palms.

The village of Thengudi Thittai has the Vasishteswarar Temple built by the Cholas is located a few kilometres from Melattur. Thengudi Thittai is believed to be the mound which Lord Shiva mounted when the whole world was submerged in water during pralaya. Crowds swarm Thittai for the Guru Peyarchi festival.
