= Bollywood & Beyond =

Bollywood & Beyond may refer to:

== Film festivals ==
- Bollywood and Beyond (Australia–New Zealand), a traveling Indian film festival, showing in Melbourne, Sydney, Adelaide in Australia and Auckland in New Zealand
- Westpac Indian Film Festival of Sydney (a.k.a. Bollywood and Beyond), Sydney, NSW, Australia
- Bollywood and Beyond, a programming segment at the London Asian Film Festival, London, England, UK; celebrating Indian film

== Other uses ==
- Bollywood & Beyond (radio); a commercial channel on XM Satellite Radio.

== See also ==
- Bollywood (disambiguation)
- Beyond (disambiguation)
