= Boley =

Boley may refer to:

== People ==
- Bruno A. Boley (1924–2017), longtime Dean of Engineering at Northwestern University
- Cutter Boley (born 2005), American football player
- Donna Boley (born 1935), American politician
- George Boley (born 1949), Liberian politician and former rebel leader
- Joe Boley (1896–1962), American Major League Baseball player
- May Boley (1881–1963), American actress
- McKale Boley (born 2003), American football player
- Michael Boley (born 1982), American former National Football League player
- Prince Mark Boley (born 1989), Liberian footballer
- Frank Dancewicz (1924-1985), American National Football League quarterback nicknamed "Boley"

== Places ==
- Boley, Oklahoma, United States, a town
- Boley, Templeport, a townland in County Cavan, Ireland

== Other uses ==
- Boley Building, Kansas City, Missouri, on the National Register of Historic Places
- Boley, another name for pastures used in the rundale grazing system used in Ireland

== See also ==
- Boly (disambiguation)
