= Bengali cinema =

Bengali cinema refers to cinema in the Bengali language, mainly produced in Bangladesh and West Bengal, a state of India:

- Cinema of Bangladesh, produced mainly in Dhaka (often called Dhallywood)
- Cinema of West Bengal, produced mainly in Tollygunge, Kolkata (often called Tollywood)

== See also ==
- Tollywood (disambiguation)
