= Boly =

Boly may refer to:

- Bóly District, Hungary
  - Bóly, a town and the district seat
- Boľ (Hungarian: Boly), a village and municipality in Slovakia
- Richard Boly, American diplomat
- Willy Boly (born 1991), French footballer
- Yéro Boly (born 1954), Burkinabé politician

== See also ==
- Boley (disambiguation)
- Bolly (disambiguation)
