= Bolly =

Bolly may refer to:

- Jorge Luis Bolly (born 1984), Mexican professional wrestler
- Mathis Bolly (born 1990), Norwegian-born Ivorian football midfielder
- Monika Bolly (born 1968), Polish actress
- Bolly Lapok (born 1952), Metropolitan Archbishop and Primate of the Anglican Church of the Province of South East Asia and 13th Bishop of Kuching, a diocese in Malaysia
- Alex Drake (Ashes to Ashes), fictional detective in the TV series Ashes to Ashes

Bolly can also be an informal shortening of:

- Bollinger, a champagne house
- Bollywood, an informal term for the Mumbai-based Hindi-language film industry
- Bristol Bolingbroke, a Canadian Second World War light bomber aircraft

== See also ==
- Bollygum, various tree species
- Bollywood (disambiguation)
- Bollywood (tree)
- Boly (disambiguation)
