= King of Tollywood =

King of Tollywood is a nickname and may refer to:

- Dev (Bengali actor) (born 1982), Indian politician and actor, producer and singer in Bengali cinema
- Jeet (actor) (born 1978), Indian actor in Bengali cinema

== See also ==
- Tollywood (disambiguation)
