= Tamil numerals =

Numeral system

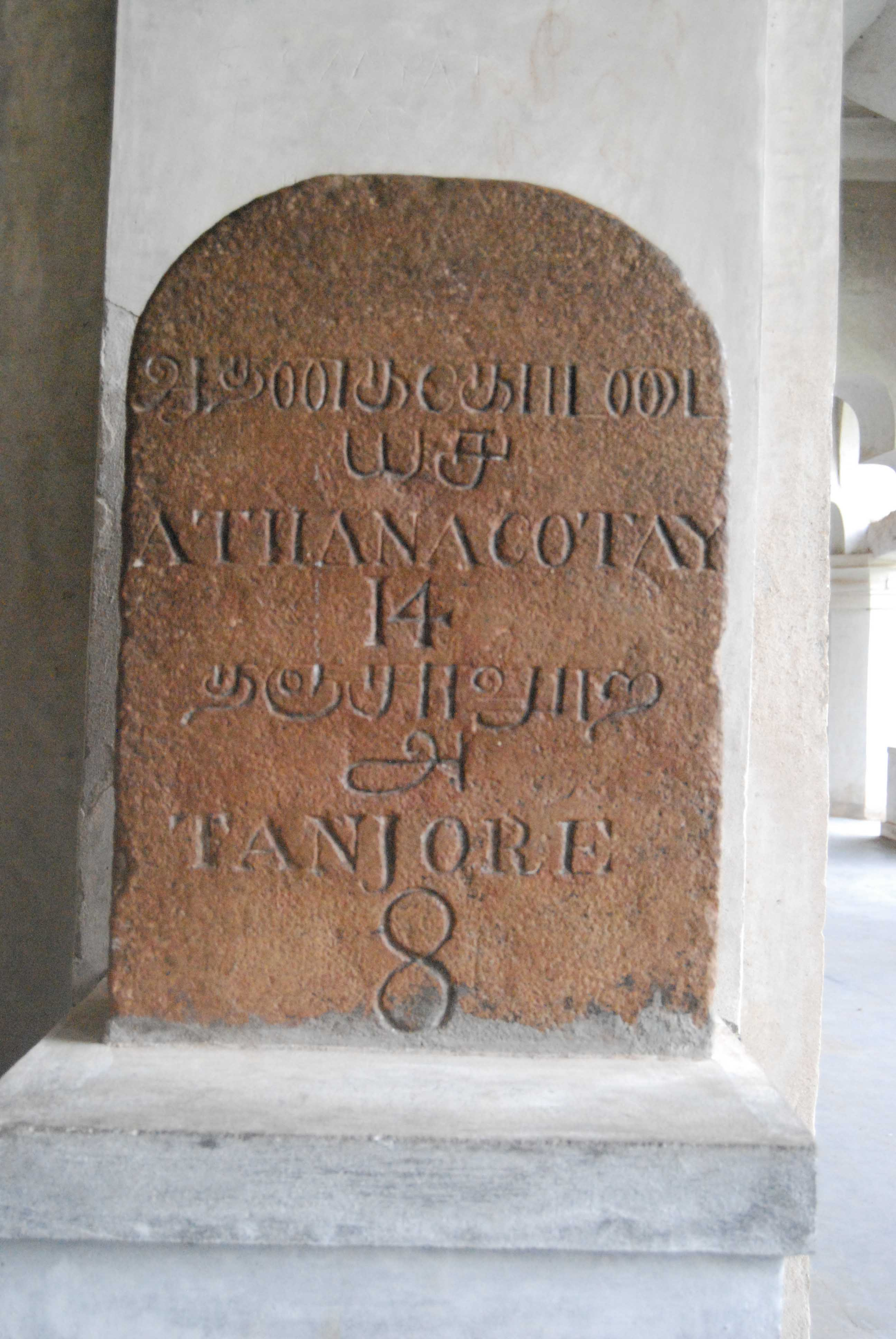
A milestone which uses both Tamil and Indo-Arabic Numerals (Tanjore Palace Museum).

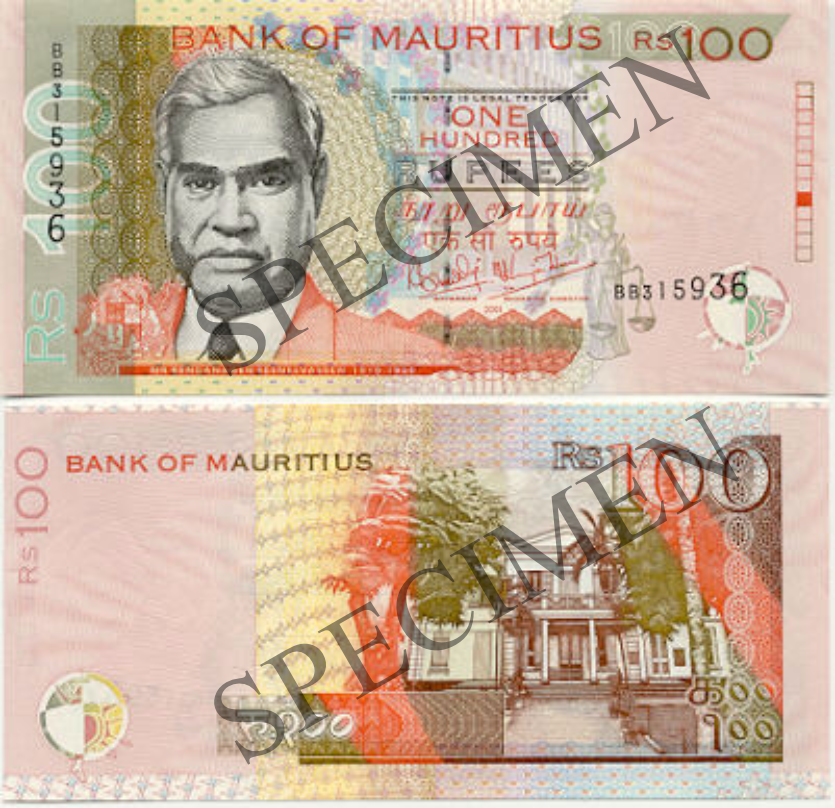
Modern Tamil numerals featured on a 100 Mauritian rupee note.

The Tamil language has number words and dedicated symbols for them in the Tamil script. They have mostly been supplanted by Arabic numerals in common usage.

== Basic numbering in Tamil (Tamil Illakkam) ==
=== Zero ===
Old Tamil possesses a special numerical character for zero (see Old Tamil numerals below), which is read as andru (literally, no/nothing). Modern Tamil words for zero include சுழியம் (suḻiyam) or பூஜ்ஜியம் (pūjjiyam).

=== First ten numbers (முதல் எண்கள்) ===
Tamil Ilakkam	Arabic Numeral	Tamil word and transliteration
௦	0	சுழியம் (suḻiyam); Old Tamil: பாழ் (pāḻ), அன்று (antu)
௧	1	ஒன்று (oṉṟu)
௨	2	இரண்டு (iraṇḍu)
௩	3	மூன்று (mūṉṟu)
௪	4	நான்கு (nāṉku)
௫	5	ஐந்து (aindhu)
௬	6	ஆறு (āṟu)
௭	7	ஏழு (ēḻu)
௮	8	எட்டு (eṭṭu)
௯	9	ஒன்பது (oṉpathu); Old Tamil: தொண்டு (thontu)
௰	10	பத்து (paththu)

== Transcribing other numbers ==
=== Reproductive and attributive prefixes ===
Tamil has a numeric prefix for each number from 1 to 9, which can be added to the words for the powers of ten (ten, hundred, thousand, etc.) to form multiples of them. For instance, the word for fifty, ஐம்பது (aimpatu) is a combination of ஐ (ai, the prefix for five) and பத்து (pattu, which is ten). The prefix for nine changes with respect to the succeeding base 10. தொ + the unvoiced consonant of the succeeding base 10 forms the prefix for nine. For instance, 90 is தொ + ண் (ண் being the unvoiced version of ணூ), hence, தொண்ணூறு).

Tamil script	Tamil prefix	Transliteration
௧	ஓர்	ōr
௨	ஈர்	īr
௩	மூ	mū
௪	நால்	nāl
௫	ஐ	ai
௬	ஆறு	āṟ(u)
௭	ஏழ்	ēḻ(u)
௮	எண்	eṇ

=== Specific characters ===
Unlike other modern Indian number systems, Tamil has distinct digits for 10, 100, and 1000. It also has distinct characters for other number-based aspects of day-to-day life.

ten	hundred	thousand
௰	௱	௲

day	month	year	debit	credit	as above	rupee	numeral
௳	௴	௵	௶	௷	௸	௹	௺

=== Powers of ten (பதின்பெருக்கம்) ===
There are two numeral systems that can be used in the Tamil language: the Tamil system which is as follows

The following are the traditional numbers of the Tamiḻakam region.

==== Original Tamil system ====
Rank	10^{1}	10^{2}	10^{3}	10^{4}	10^{5}	10^{6}	10^{9}	10^{12}	10^{15}	10^{18}	10^{20}	10^{21}
Words	பத்து	நூறு	ஆயிரம்	பத்தாயிரம்	நூறாயிரம்	மெய்யிரம்	தொள்ளுண்	ஈகியம்	நெளை	இளஞ்சி	வெள்ளம்	ஆம்பல்
Character	௰	௱	௲	௰௲	௱௲	௲௲	௲௲௲	௲௲௲௲	௲௲௲௲௲	௲௲௲௲௲௲	௱௲௲௲௲௲௲	௲௲௲௲௲௲௲
Transliteration	pattu	nūṟu	āyiram	pattāyiram	nūṟāyiram	meyyiram	toḷḷuṇ	īkiyam	neḷai	iḷañci	veḷḷam	āmbal
Translation	ten	hundred	thousand	ten thousand	hundred thousand	million	billion (milliard)	trillion (billion)	quadrillion (billiard)	quintillion (trillion)	hundred quintillion	sextillion (trilliard)

==== Current Tamil system ====
Rank	10^{5}	10^{6}	10^{7}	10^{8}	10^{9}	10^{11}	10^{13}	10^{15}	10^{17}	10^{19}	10^{21}	10^{25}
Words	இலட்சம்	பத்து இலட்சம்	கோடி	பத்துக் கோடி	அற்புதம்	நிகர்ப்புதம்	கர்வம்	சங்கம்	அர்த்தம்	பூரியம்	முக்கொடி	மாயுகம்
Character	௱௲	௲௲	௰௲௲	௱௲௲	௲௲௲	௱௲௲௲	௱௲௲௲௲	௲௲௲௲௲	௱௲௲௲௲௲	௰௲௲௲௲௲௲	௲௲௲௲௲௲௲	௰௲௲௲௲௲௲௲௲
Transliteration	ilaṭcam	pattu ilaṭcam	kōṭi	pattuk kōṭi	aṟputam	nikarpputam	karvam	śaṅkam	arttam	pūriyam	mukkoṭi	māyukam
Translation	lakh	ten lakh	crore	ten crore	arab	kharab	nil / hundred kharab	padma	shankh / hundred padma	hundred shankh	ten thousand shankh	ten crore shankh

=== Partitive numerals (பகுத்தல்) ===
==== Fractions (பின்னம்) ====
Proposals to encode Tamil fractions and symbols to Unicode were submitted. As of version 12.0, Tamil characters used for fractional values in traditional accounting practices were added to the Unicode Standard.

===== Transcribing fractions (பின்னம் எழுத்தல்) =====
Any fraction can be transcribed by affixing -இல் (-il) after the denominator followed by the numerator. For instance, 1/41 can be said as நாற்பத்து ஒன்றில் ஒன்று (nāṟpattu oṉṟil oṉṟu).

The suffixing of the -இல் (-il) requires the last consonant of the number to be changed to its இ (i) form. For example, மூன்று + இல் (mūṉṟu + -il) becomes மூன்றில் (mūṉṟil); note the உ (u) has been omitted.

Common fractions (பொது பின்னங்கள்) have names already allocated to them, hence, these names are often used rather than the above method.

Glyph	x/320	Value	Decimal	Tamil name	Transliteration
𑿀	1/320	1/320	0.003125	முந்திரி	muntiri
𑿁	2/320	1/160	0.00625	அரைக்காணி	araikkaṇi
𑿂	4/320	1/80	0.0125	காணி	kāṇi
𑿄	8/320	1/40	0.025	அரைய்மா	araimā
𑿆	12/320	3/80	0.0375	முக்காணி	mukkaṇi
𑿈	16/320	1/20	0.05	மா	mā
𑿋	32/320	1/10	0.1	இருமா	irumā
𑿍	48/320	3/20	0.15	மும்மா	mummā
𑿏	64/320	1/5	0.2	நான்குமா	nāṅkumā
𑿃	5/320	1/64	0.015625	கால் விசம்	kālvicam
ழூ	10/320	1/32	0.03125	அரை விசம்	araivicam
𑿇	15/320	3/64	0.046875	முக்கால் விசம்	mukkālvicam
𑿉,𑿊	20/320	1/16	0.0625	விசம் / மாகாணி	vicam / mākāṇi
𑿌	40/320	1/8	0.125	அரை கால்	araikkāl
𑿎	60/320	3/16	0.1875	மூ விசம் / மும்மா முக்காணி	mūvicam / mummāmukkaṇi
𑿐	80/320	1/4	0.25	கால்	kāl
𑿑,𑿒	160/320	1/2	0.5	அரை	arai
𑿓	240/320	3/4	0.75	முக்கால்	mukkāl
𑿔	×1/320	×1/320	×0.003125	கில்	kiḷ

when prefixed to a fraction, reduces (downscales) the value of the fraction by a scale of 1/320 (the value of the lowest fraction muntiri).

Other fractions include:

Value	Name	Transliteration
3/16 = 0.1875	மும்மாகாணி	mummākāṇi
3/20 = 0.15	மும்மா	mummā
3/64 = 0.046875	முக்கால்வீசம்	mukkālvīsam
3/80 = 0.0375	முக்காணி	mukkāṇi
1/32 = 0.03125	அரைவீசம்	araivīsam
1/64 = 0.015625	கால் வீசம்	kāl vīsam
3/320 = 0.009375	முக்கால்காணி	mukkālkāṇi
1/320 = 0.003125	முந்திரி	muntiri
3/1280 = 0.00234375	கீழ் முக்கால்	kīḻ mukkāl
1/640 = 0.0015625	கீழரை	kīḻarai
1/1280 = 7.8125×10^{−4}	கீழ் கால்	kīḻ kāl
1/1600 = 0.000625	கீழ் நாலுமா	kīḻ nālumā
3/5120 ≈ 5.85938×10^{−4}	கீழ் மூன்று வீசம்	kīḻ mūṉṟu vīsam
3/6400 = 4.6875×10^{−4}	கீழ் மும்மா	kīḻ mummā
1/2500 = 0.0004	கீழ் அரைக்கால்	kīḻ araikkāl
1/3200 = 3.12500×10^{−4}	கீழ் இருமா	kīḻ irumā
1/5120 ≈ 1.95313×10^{−4}	கீழ் வீசம்	kīḻ vīsam
1/6400 = 1.56250×10^{−4}	கீழொருமா	kīḻorumā
1/102400 ≈ 9.76563×10^{−6}	கீழ்முந்திரி	kīḻmuntiri
1/2150400 ≈ 4.65030×10^{−7}	இம்மி	immi
1/23654400 ≈ 4.22754×10^{−8}	மும்மி	mummi
1/165580800 ≈ 6.03935×10^{−9}	அணு	aṇu
1/1490227200 ≈ 6.71039×10^{−10}	குணம்	kuṇam
1/7451136000 ≈ 1.34208×10^{−10}	பந்தம்	pantam
1/44706816000 ≈ 2.23680×10^{−11}	பாகம்	pāgam
1/312947712000 ≈ 3.19542×10^{−12}	விந்தம்	vintam
1/5320111104000 ≈ 1.87966×10^{−13}	நாகவிந்தம்	nāgavintam
1/74481555456000 ≈ 1.34261×10^{−14}	சிந்தை	sintai
1/1489631109120000 ≈ 6.71307×10^{−16}	கதிர்முனை	katirmuṉai
1/59585244364800000 ≈ 1.67827×10^{−17}	குரல்வளைப்படி	kuralvaḷaippaḍi
1/3575114661888000000 ≈ 2.79711×10^{−19}	வெள்ளம்	veḷḷam
1/357511466188800000000 ≈ 2.79711×10^{−21}	நுண்மணல்	nuṇmaṇal
1/2323824530227200000000 ≈ 4.30325×10^{−22}	தேர்த்துகள்	tērttugaḷ

Aṇu was considered as the lowest fraction by ancient Tamils as size of smallest physical object (similar to an atom). Later, this term went to Sanskrit to refer directly to atoms.

==== Decimals (பதின்மம்) ====
Decimal point is called புள்ளி (puḷḷi) in Tamil. For example, 1.1 would be read as ஒன்று புள்ளி ஒன்று (oṉṟu puḷḷi oṉṟu). In Sri Lankan Tamil, Thasam தசம்.

==== Percentage (விழுக்காடு) ====
Percentage is known as விழுக்காடு (viḻukkāḍu) in Tamil or சதவீதம் (śatavītam). These words are simply added after a number to form percentages. For instance, four percent is நான்கு சதவீதம் (nāṉku satavītam) or நான்கு விழுக்காடு (nāṉku viḻukkāḍu). Percentage symbol (%) is also recognised and used.

=== Ordinal numbers (வரிசை எண்கள்) ===
Ordinal numbers are formed by adding the suffix -ஆம் (ām) after the number, except for 'First'.

Ordinal	Tamil	Transliteration
First	முதல்	mudal (/muðal/)
Second	இரண்டாம்	iraṇḍām
Third	மூன்றாம்	mūṉṟām
Fourth	நான்காம்	nāṉkām
101st	நூற்று ஒன்றாம்	nūṟṟu oṉṟām

=== Collective numerals (கூட்டெண்கள்) ===
English	Tamil	Transliteration
Single	ஒற்றை	oṟṟai
Pair	இரட்டை	iraṭṭai
Reproductives	௺ + வினைச்சொல்	Numeric prefix + noun*
Single (pillar), double (pillar)...	ஒருக்(கால்), இருக்(கால்)-	oruk(kāl), iruk(kāl)*
Distributives	௺ + முறை	Numeric prefix + muṟai
Once, twice...	ஒருமுறை, இருமுறை	orumuṟai, irumuṟai

- As always, when blending two words into one, an unvoiced form of the consonant as the one that the second starts with, is placed in between to blend.

== Traditional Tamil counting song ==
This song is a list of each number with a concept its primarily associated with.

Tamil	Transliteration	English
ஒரு குலம்	oru kulam	One race
ஈரினம்	īriṉam	Two sexes – male (ஆண், āṇ), female (பெண், peṇ)
முத்தமிழ்	muttamiḻ	Three sections of Tamil – literature (இயல், iyal), music (இசை, isai), and drama (நாடகம், nāṭakam)
நான்மறை	nāṉmaṟai	Four scriptures
ஐம்புலன்	aimpulaṉ	Five senses
அறுசுவை	aṟucuvai	Six tastes – sweet (iṉippu), pungent (kārppu), bitter (kasappu), sour (puḷippu), salty (uvarppu), and astringent (tuvarppu).
ஏழிசை	ēḻicai	Seven musical notes (kural, tuttam, kaikkiḷai, uḻai, iḷi, viḷari, tāram)
எண் பக்கம்	eṇ pakkam	Eight directions – east (kiḻakku), west (mēṟku), north (vaḍakku), south (teṟku), south-west (teṉ-mēṟku), south-east (teṉ-kiḻakku), north-west (vaḍa-mēṟku), and north-east (vaḍa-kiḻakku).
நவமணிகள்	navamaṇikaḷ	Nine gems – diamond (வைரம், vairam), emerald (மரகதம், marakatam), blue sapphire (நீலம், nīlam), garnet (கோமேதகம், kōmētakam), red coral (பவளம், pavaḷam), ruby (மாணிக்கம், māṇikkam), pearl (முத்து, muttu), topaz (புட்பராகம், puṭparākam), and cat's eye (வைடூரியம், vaiṭūriyam).
தொன்மெய்ப்பாடு	toṉmeyppāṭu	Also known as navarasam as per the dance expressions. These are joyful (uvakai), humour (nakai), cries (aḻukai), innocent (vekuḷi), proud (perumitam), fear (accam), disgust (iḷivaral), wonder (maruṭkai), and tranquility (amaiti).

== Influence on other Dravidian languages ==
As the ancient classical Dravidian language, Tamil numerals influenced and shaped the numerals of the others in the family. The following table compares the main Dravidian languages.

Number	Tamil	Kannada	Malayalam	Telugu	Tulu	Kolami	Kurukh	Brahui	Proto-Dravidian
1	oṉṟu	ondu	onnŭ	okaṭi	oñji	okkod	oṇṭa	asiṭ	*oru(1)
2	iraṇḍu	eraḍu	raṇṭŭ	renḍu	eraḍ, iraḍ	irāṭ	indiṅ	irāṭ	*iru(2)
3	mūṉṟu	mūru	mūnnŭ	mūḍu	mūji	mūndiṅ	mūnd	musiṭ	*muC
4	nālŭ, nāṉku	nālku	nālŭ	nālugu	nāl	nāliṅ	nākh	čār (II)	*nān
5	aintu, añju	aydu	añcŭ	ayidu	ayin, ain	ayd ^{3}	pancē (II)	panč (II)	*cayN
6	āṟu	āru	āṟŭ	āru	āji	ār ^{3}	soyyē (II)	šaš (II)	*caru
7	ēḻu	ēḷu	ēḻŭ	ēḍu	ēḍ, ēl, ēḷ	ēḍ ^{3}	sattē (II)	haft (II)	*ēlu
8	eṭṭu	eṇṭu	eṭṭŭ	enimidi	eḍma, yeḍma, eṇma, enma	enumadī ^{3}	aṭṭhē (II)	hašt (II)	*eṭṭu
9	oṉpatu	ombattu	onpatŭ	tommidi	ormba	tomdī ^{3}	naiṃyē (II)	nōh (II)	*toḷ
10	pattu	hattu	pattŭ	padi	patt	padī ^{3}	dassē (II)	dah (II)	*pat(tu)

Also, Tamil through the Pallava script which itself through the Kawi script, Khmer script and other South-east Asian scripts has shaped the numeral grapheme of most South-east Asian languages.

== History ==
Before the Government of India unveiled ₹ as the new rupee symbol, people in Tamil Nadu used the Tamil letter ௹ as the symbol. This symbol continues to be used occasionally as rupee symbol by Indian Tamils. It is also used by Tamils in Sri Lanka.

The symbol ௳ is also known as the Piḷḷaiyār Suḻi (lit. 'Curl of Piḷḷaiyār'), a symbol that most Tamil Hindus will start off any auspicious document with. It is written to invoke the god Piḷḷaiyār, known otherwise as Ganesha, who is the remover of obstacles.

== See also ==
- Kaṇita Tīpikai
- Tamil script
- Tamil units of measurement
