= List of Hollywood-inspired nicknames =

Hollywood-inspired nicknames, most starting with the first letter or letters of the location and ending in the suffix "-ollywood" or "-wood", have been given to various locations around the world with associations to the film industry – inspired by the iconic Hollywood in Los Angeles, California, whose name has come to be a metonym for the motion picture industry of the United States.

The first Hollywood-inspired nickname, dating back to 1932, was Tollywood, referring to the Bengali film industry in Tollygunge, a neighbourhood in Kolkata, West Bengal, India. The most widely recognized Hollywood-inspired nickname is Bollywood, the informal name for the Hindi language film industry in Mumbai (formerly Bombay), Maharashtra, India.

== Film industry ==
=== Asia ===
==== South Asia ====
- Bollywood is the informal name given to the Mumbai-based (formerly Bombay) Hindi-language film industry.
- Kollywood is the informal name derived from Kodambakkam in Chennai, Tamil Nadu, the base of Tamil-language film industry.
- Tollywood may refer to:
  - The Bengali film industry based out of Tollygunge in Kolkata (formerly Calcutta), India. It was the first Hollywood-inspired nickname, dating back to 1932.
  - The Telugu film industry in Andhra Pradesh and Telangana, India.
- Pollywood may refer to:
  - The Punjabi language cinema of Punjab, India. also referred as Punjwood.
  - The Pashto language movie industry in Peshawar, Khyber Pakhtunkhwa, Pakistan.
- Lollywood refers to the Punjabi films of Pakistani film industry based in the city of Lahore, Punjab, Pakistan.
- Bhojiwood refers to Bhojpuri language films of Bihar, Uttar Pradesh and Jharkhand, India.
- Dhallywood refers to the Bangladeshi film industry, based in the city of Dhaka, Bangladesh.
- Chhollywood is the colloquial name given to the Chhattisgarhi language movie industry in Chhattisgarh, India.
- Helawood refers to Cinema of Sri Lanka.
- Mollywood may also refer to the Malayalam film industry in the state of Kerala, India.
- Sandalwood refers to the Kannada language film industry in Karnataka, India.
- Jollywood is the name given to Assamese language film industry based in Assam, India.
- Ollywood is the colloquial name given to the Odia language movie industry in Odisha, India.
- Kariwood refers to the Pakistani film industry, based in the city of Karachi, Pakistan.
- Dhollywood or Gollywood refers to the cinema of Gujarati Language in Gujarat, India.
- Coastalwood refers to Tulu cinema in the Tulunad region (Udupi, Mangalore of Karnataka, Kasaragod of Kerala), India.

==== East Asia ====
- Mainland China
  - Cantonwood refers to the Hong Kong cinema for Cantonese-language films.
  - Chinawood is a nickname for the Hengdian World Studios, the largest film studio in China, part of the cinema of China.
- Choicewood refers to the multicultural-related Japanese cinema in cooperation with the C12 and G20 countries.
- Hallyuwood refers to the South Korean cinema, the most popular in the Korean Wave.
- Hogawood and Animewood refers to the Japanese cinema, the most popular in Japanese popular culture (like Cool Japan).
- Taiwood refers to the Taiwanese cinema, the most popular in the Taiwanese Wave.

==== Others ====
- Aseanwood refers to the Southeast Asian cinema, named after the intergovernmental organization of the same name.
- Kazakhwood, an informal name for Kazakhstan, was proposed for use from Kazakh director Bakhyt Aupbayev.

=== Africa ===
- Ghollywood refers to the film industry in Ghana.
- Hillywood refers to the annual Rwanda Film Festival and to the film industry in general in Rwanda, a country known for its hilly terrain.
- Nollywood refers to the film industry in Nigeria.
- Kannywood refers to the Hausa-language film industry of Northern Nigeria, based in Kano.
- Riverwood is the film industry in Kenya.
- Swahiliwood refers to the cinema of Tanzania
- Ugawood is the Ugandan film industry.
  - Wakaliwood refers to the film studio in Wakaliga, Kampala, Uganda, which specializes in very violent films.
- Zambiwood refers to the cinema of Zambia
- Zollywood refers to the cinema of Zimbabwe.
- Karewood refers to the Karai-karai-language film industry of Northern Nigeria, based in Yobe.

=== The Americas ===
- Hollywood North refers to film and television production in Canada, especially the cities of Montreal, Toronto and Vancouver.
- Mollywood may refer to the Mormon film industry in the United States.

Cottonwood is a city in Utah and nickname for the booming film industry in Utah.

- Tamalewood may refer to the active film industry of the state of New Mexico.
- Somaliwood refers to the film industry that has sprung up around the Somali immigrant community of Columbus, Ohio.
- Y'allywood refers to film production in Atlanta, Georgia.
- Borikwood refers to the cinema of Boriquen (Taíno name for Puerto Rico).
- Latinwood refers to the Latin American film industry
  - Bogotawood refers to the Colombian cinema based in Bogotá.
  - Chollywood refers to the Peruvian cinema. It is also spelled "Choliwood".
  - Peruliwood refers to the film production in Peru.
  - Mexiwood refers to the Mexican cinema.
  - Sambawood refers to the Brazilian cinema based in Rio de Janeiro.

=== Europe ===
- Borehamwood has been home to several film and TV production studios since the 1920s; this earned it the nickname of "British Hollywood".
- Etyekwood is the informal name given in the media to Hungary's new Korda Studios in the wine-making village of Etyek near Budapest.
- Gaulywood is an informal name for France's film industry that has been in use since 2001.
- Görliwood is the informal name for the German city of Görlitz, which frequently serves as a filming location.
- Hollyhammar was used to refer to a TV production facility in Hallstahammar, Sweden, in the 1990s.
- Hollywood on the Tiber refers to when Rome's Cinecittà Studios was a popular choice for international (and domestic) film productions between the 1950s and 1960s.
- Olivewood is a metonym for Cyprus's efforts to mature into a high-value movie production destination.
- Pinewood, the name given because of the pine trees surrounding it. It is located in Buckinghamshire, England. This studio dates from the 1930s so its real name predates the "-wood" suffix.
- Trollywood is the informal name for a film production facility in Trollhättan Municipality, Sweden.
- Valleywood is the informal name for the Dragon International film studio complex in Wales.

=== Oceania ===
- Wellywood refers to Wellington, New Zealand – home of Weta Workshop, Weta Digital and Peter Jackson's film studio.
- Mollywood is sometimes jokingly used to describe the Hollywood Sign-inspired town name on the hillside at the eastern edge of Mosgiel in New Zealand.
- Aussiewood or Oziwood refers to Australian cinema, including Ozploitation from the 1970s and 1980s but post-dates the genre.

== Other ==
Some Hollywood-inspired nicknames do not refer directly to the film industry:

- Dollywood is a theme park owned by Dolly Parton in Pigeon Forge, Tennessee.
- FC Hollywood is a nickname for FC Bayern Munich, used especially widely by German media in the 1990s, an era in which Bayern players were as likely to appear in gossip pages as in sports pages.
- "Pallywood" and "Gazawood" are not used to describe Palestinian cinema, but rather a derogatory term used to falsely accuse Palestinians of staging scenes of suffering and civilian death in the Israeli–Palestinian conflict with propagandistic implications. Similarly, "Hezbollywood" was used to describe instances of alleged photojournalistic misrepresentation during the 2006 Lebanon war.

== See also ==
- Babelsberg Studio
- Cinecittà Studios
- Cinema Europe: The Other Hollywood
- Elstree Studios
- List of film production companies
- Lists of nicknames – nickname list articles on Wikipedia
