= Wellington Blown Away sign =

Nickname of Wellington, New Zealand, referencing the city's film industry

Coordinates: 41°18′54″S 174°48′40″E

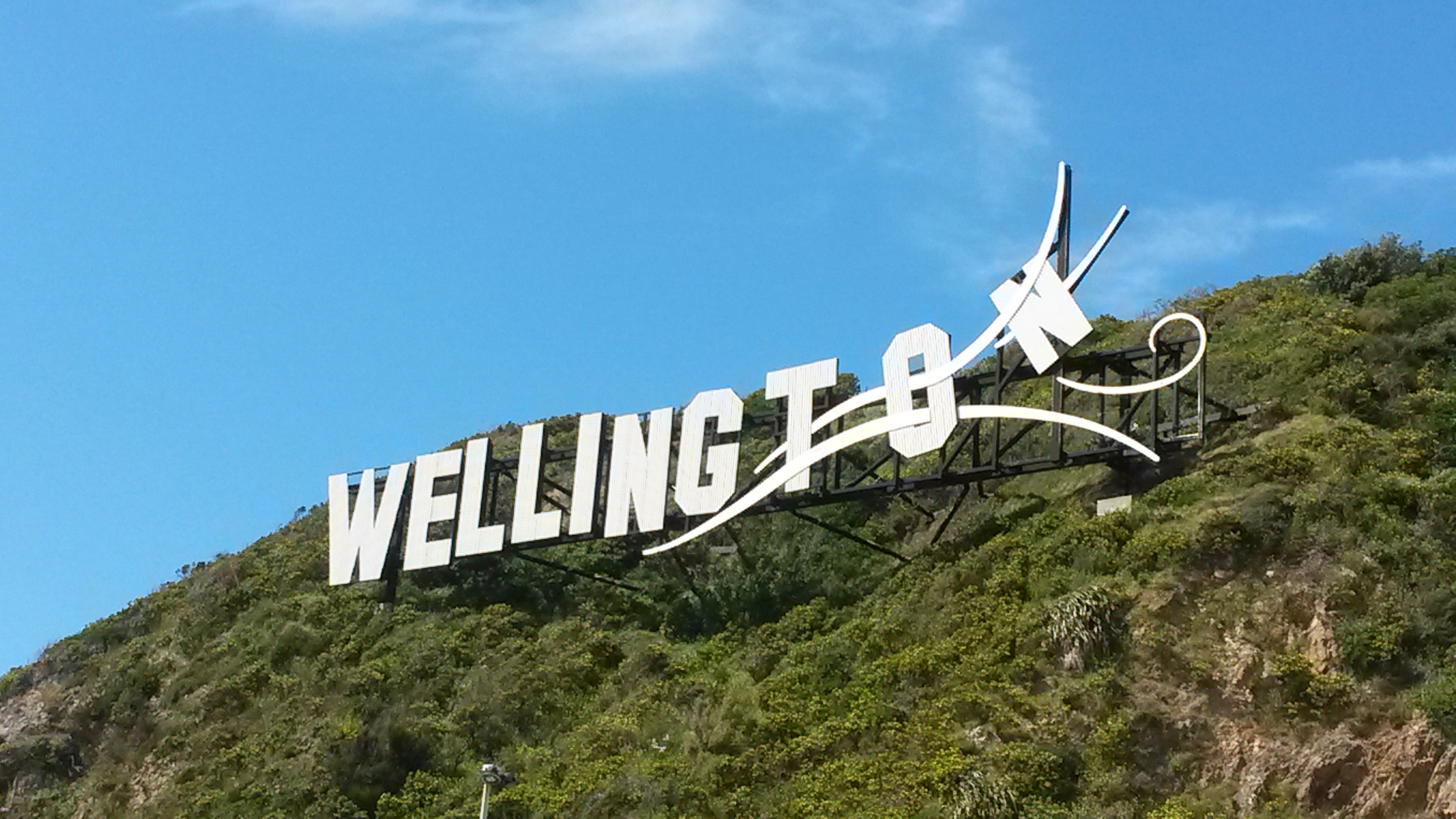
"Wellington Blown Away" sign near Wellington Airport

The Wellington Blown Away sign is a landmark of Wellington, New Zealand.

== Wellywood ==
Wellywood is an informal name for the city of Wellington. The name—a portmanteau of Wellington and Hollywood—was coined in the 1990s and is a reference to the film production business established in the city by The Lord of the Rings film director Sir Peter Jackson, and Wellington-based special effects companies Weta Workshop and Weta Digital. The businesses operate a number of film-related facilities in the Wellington suburb of Miramar.

== History ==
In March 2010, the Wellington Airport company announced plans to erect a Hollywood-style sign saying WELLYWOOD on a hillside next to the Miramar cutting. The Hollywood Chamber of Commerce, which owns the original Hollywood sign, threatened legal action over concerns about breach of copyright. After the airport considered a range of alternatives, it was announced in May 2011 that the Wellywood sign would be going ahead. However this was met with enormous criticism, and on 1 June 2011 the airport announced that a panel would be convened to consider alternative sign options. The panel ran a binding public poll on The Dominion Post website with the Wellington Blown Away design being chosen. The sign spells WELLINGTON, with the last letters being "blown" upwards. It was designed by Matt Sellars and Ray McKay from Auckland-based company Saatchi & Saatchi. The sign was erected on 27 July 2012, and cost $80,000.

In 2014 the sign was changed twice. The W in the sign was replaced with a red V to spell VELLINGTON, promoting a local vampire comedy movie called What We Do in the Shadows. Later the sign was changed to WOWINGTON to promote the World of Wearable Art fashion show. In May 2022 somebody painted the sign in a patchwork of pastel colours and it remained that way for months. In June 2023 the sign was repainted white and the O in the sign was temporarily replaced with a 3.6-metre-diameter (12 ft) football to promote the 2023 FIFA Women's World Cup.

== See also ==
- List of Hollywood-inspired nicknames
- Cinema of New Zealand
- Park Road Post
- Weta Digital
