= Mollywood =

Mollywood may refer to:

- Malayalam cinema, a sector of nickname for the Indian film industry in the state of Kerala
- Mollywood (Malegaon), a low budget film industry near Mumbai
- Mollywood (Galaxy Studios), a film funding company based in Mol, Belgium

== See also ==
- List of Hollywood-inspired nicknames
- Molly Wood (born 1975), American journalist
- Welcome to Mollywood (disambiguation)
