= Trollywood =

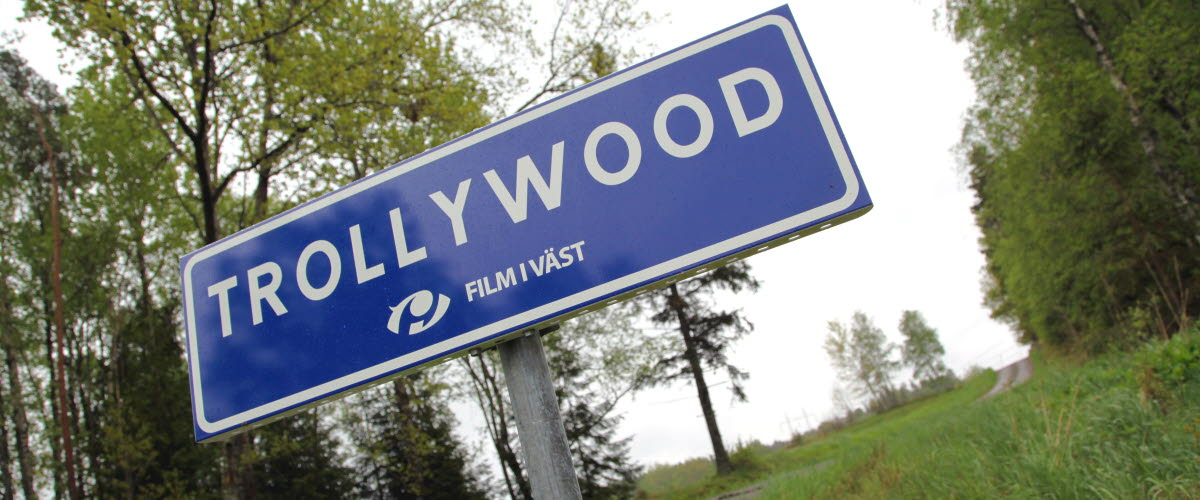
Trollywood sign

Trollywood is the informal name for a film production facility in Trollhättan, Sweden. Movies shot there include Fucking Åmål (distributed in English-speaking countries as Show Me Love), Dancer in the Dark, Manderlay and Dogville. The movie studio Film i Väst centered there produces about half of the Swedish full-length films. The name is a play on Hollywood, Los Angeles.

Trollhättan has hosted the annual Trollywood Animation Festival since 2016.

== See also ==
- Swedish Film Institute
- Hollywood-inspired names
- Hollywood
- Bollywood
- Kollywood
- Nollywood
- Dhallywood
