= Tollywood =

Tollywood may refer to the following film industries in Indian cinema:

- Cinema of West Bengal, the Bengali-language film industry based in Tollygunge, a locality of Kolkata, West Bengal, India
- Telugu cinema, the Telugu-language film industry based in Andhra Pradesh and Telangana, India, with the main production hub in Film Nagar, Hyderabad, Telangana

== See also ==
- King of Tollywood (disambiguation)
- Bengali cinema (disambiguation)
- Tolly, a name
- Wood (disambiguation)
- Bollywood (disambiguation)
- Hollywood (disambiguation)
- Mollywood (disambiguation)
- Pollywood (disambiguation)
