= Prince Mark Boley =

Liberian footballer

Personal information
- Date of birth: 15 June 1989 (age 37)
- Place of birth: Liberia
- Position: Attacking midfielder

Team information
- Current team: Stallion FC

Senior career*
Years	Team	Apps	(Gls)
2006–2007	UMC Roots		
2008–2009	Feni SC		
2009–2010	Majees SC		
2010	Kaya FC		
2011	Union Internacional Manila		
2012	Kaya FC		
2012–2015	Stallion FC		
2015–2016	Rhode Island Reds		

International career^{‡}
2013	Liberia	1	(0)
- * Club domestic league appearances and goals as of 13 June 2014 ‡ National team caps and goals as of 13 June 2014

Prince Mark Boley (born 15 June 1989) is a Liberian former footballer who played as a midfielder and forward. He represented Liberia at the international level.

== Club career ==
In 2010, Boley joined Kaya FC in the United Football League. He transferred to Stallion FC during the 2012 UFL season.

== International career ==
In 2013, Boley got a chance to play for the Liberian national team in the qualifying rounds of the 2014 FIFA World Cup. He made his international debut for Liberia in the Confederation of African Football second round qualification for the 2014 FIFA World Cup on 7 September 2013 against the Angola national team.

== Legal Issues ==
On 17 July 2019, Boley was convicted in Providence, Rhode Island of lying to immigration officials and providing false information on immigration documents. Boley had entered the United States on 24 July 2015, and had married a Rhode Island woman in an attempt to receive permanent resident status. Boley is scheduled to be sentenced in District Court on 27 November 2019.
