= Tamil Thai Valthu =

Tamil Thai Valthu (lit. 'Tamil Mother's Blessing') may refer to:

- "Tamil Thai Valthu" (Tamil Nadu), anthem of the Indian state of Tamil Nadu
- "Tamil Thai Valthu" (Puducherry), anthem of the Indian union territory of Puducherry
