= Nollywood (disambiguation) =

Nollywood is a term referring to cinema from the region of the Gulf of Guinea and its diaspora populations.

Nollywood may also refer to:

- Cinema of Nigeria, the original meaning of Nollywood
- Nollywood TV, a French-language TV channel of France featuring Nigerian film
- Nollywood Movies, an English-language British TV channel featuring Nigerian film

== See also ==
- New Nollywood
- Cinema of Ghana, included in the extended meaning of Nollywood
- Hollywood (disambiguation)
