= Tamil cinema (disambiguation) =

Tamil cinema refers to the film industry dedicated to production of films in the Tamil-language, based in the Indian city of Chennai.

Tamil cinema can also refer to other Tamil filmmaking industries in other parts of the world.

- Sri Lankan Tamil cinema
  - List of Sri Lankan Tamil films
- Malaysian Tamil cinema
- Tamil cinema and Dravidian politics, regional politics in India

== See also ==
- Kollywood (disambiguation), informal name for the Indian Tamil-language film industry
- Pride of Tamil Cinema, book on Indian cinema by G. Dhananjayan
- Vijay Award for Contribution to Tamil Cinema, Indian award for excellence in cinematic arts
- S. S. Vasan, Indian filmmaker known as the "Cecil B. DeMille of Tamil cinema"
