= Tamil Supplement =

- Range: U+11FC0..U+11FFF (64 code points)
- Plane: SMP
- Scripts: Tamil
- Assigned: 51 code points
- Unused: 13 reserved code points

Unicode version history
- 12.0 (2019): 51 (+51)

Unicode documentation
- Code chart ∣ Web page

Tamil Supplement is a Unicode block containing Tamil historic fractions and symbols.

== Block ==
Tamil Supplement^{[1]}^{[2]} Official Unicode Consortium code chart (PDF)
	0	1	2	3	4	5	6	7	8	9	A	B	C	D	E	F
U+11FCx	𑿀	𑿁	𑿂	𑿃	𑿄	𑿅	𑿆	𑿇	𑿈	𑿉	𑿊	𑿋	𑿌	𑿍	𑿎	𑿏
U+11FDx	𑿐	𑿑	𑿒	𑿓	𑿔	𑿕	𑿖	𑿗	𑿘	𑿙	𑿚	𑿛	𑿜	𑿝	𑿞	𑿟
U+11FEx	𑿠	𑿡	𑿢	𑿣	𑿤	𑿥	𑿦	𑿧	𑿨	𑿩	𑿪	𑿫	𑿬	𑿭	𑿮	𑿯
U+11FFx	𑿰	𑿱														𑿿
Notes: 1. As of Unicode version 16.0; 2. Grey areas indicate non-assigned code points

== History ==
The following Unicode-related documents record the purpose and process of defining specific characters in the Tamil Supplement block:

Version	Final code points (Note: Proposed code points and characters names may differ from final code points and names)	Count	L2 ID	WG2 ID	Document
12.0	U+11FC0..11FF1, 11FFF	51	L2/09-317		Sharma, Shriramana (2009-09-22), Request to allocate a Tamil Supplementary block in the Unicode SMP Roadmap
12.0	U+11FC0..11FF1, 11FFF	51	L2/09-376		Sharma, Shriramana (2009-10-25), Request for encoding Tamil Major Fractions
12.0	U+11FC0..11FF1, 11FFF	51	L2/09-398		Ganesan, Naga (2009-10-30), Tamil fractions - Comment on L2/09-376
12.0	U+11FC0..11FF1, 11FFF	51	L2/09-416		Dias, Gihan (2009-11-02), Comment on L2/09-376 Tamil Fractions
12.0	U+11FC0..11FF1, 11FFF	51	L2/10-408		Ganesan, Naga (2010-10-19), Encoding of Tamil Fractions in Unicode
12.0	U+11FC0..11FF1, 11FFF	51	L2/10-428		Sharma, Shriramana (2010-10-22), Revised Tamil fractions proposal (supplement to L2/10-334R)
12.0	U+11FC0..11FF1, 11FFF	51	L2/10-440		Anderson, Deborah; McGowan, Rick; Whistler, Ken (2010-10-27), "2. Tamil Fractions", Review of Indic-related L2 documents and Recommendations to the UTC
12.0	U+11FC0..11FF1, 11FFF	51	L2/10-334		Sharma, Shriramana (2010-11-09), Request to encode Tamil fractions
12.0	U+11FC0..11FF1, 11FFF	51	L2/10-416R		Moore, Lisa (2010-11-09), "D.5.1", UTC #125 / L2 #222 Minutes
12.0	U+11FC0..11FF1, 11FFF	51	L2/12-384		Ganesan, Naga (2012-06-11), Comments on Tamil fractions and Tamil credit sign
12.0	U+11FC0..11FF1, 11FFF	51	L2/12-231		Sharma, Shriramana (2012-07-17), Proposal to encode Tamil fractions and symbols
12.0	U+11FC0..11FF1, 11FFF	51	L2/12-232		Sharma, Shriramana (2012-07-17), Regarding my Tamil fractions/symbols proposal
12.0	U+11FC0..11FF1, 11FFF	51	L2/12-267		Anderson, Deborah; McGowan, Rick; Whistler, Ken (2012-07-21), "II. TAMIL", Review of Indic-related documents and Recommendations to the UTC
12.0	U+11FC0..11FF1, 11FFF	51	L2/12-243		Ganesan, Naga (2012-07-23), Comment on L2/12-231: Tamil symbols and fractions
12.0	U+11FC0..11FF1, 11FFF	51	L2/13-007		Nakkeeran, P. R. (2013-01-21), Upcoming discussion in Unicode about Tamil fractions
12.0	U+11FC0..11FF1, 11FFF	51	L2/13-028		Anderson, Deborah; McGowan, Rick; Whistler, Ken; Pournader, Roozbeh (2013-01-28), "17", Recommendations to UTC on Script Proposals
12.0	U+11FC0..11FF1, 11FFF	51	L2/13-047	N4430	Sharma, Shriramana (2013-03-05), Revised proposal to encode Tamil fractions and symbols
12.0	U+11FC0..11FF1, 11FFF	51	L2/13-077		Ganesan, Naga (2013-04-26), Comment on L2/13-047: Revised Proposal to encode Tamil fractions and Symbols
12.0	U+11FC0..11FF1, 11FFF	51	L2/13-086		Anderson, Deborah; McGowan, Rick; Whistler, Ken; Pournader, Roozbeh (2013-04-26), "14", Recommendations to UTC on Script Proposals
12.0	U+11FC0..11FF1, 11FFF	51	L2/13-058		Moore, Lisa (2013-06-12), "D.3", UTC #135 Minutes
12.0	U+11FC0..11FF1, 11FFF	51		N4462	Sharma, Shriramana (2013-06-12), Attestations for Tamil fractions and Symbols
12.0	U+11FC0..11FF1, 11FFF	51	L2/13-161		Request to Use Tamil names in Tamil fractions and symbols, 2013-07-24
12.0	U+11FC0..11FF1, 11FFF	51	L2/13-174	N4476	Sharma, Shriramana (2013-08-09), Request to change the Unicode chart font for Tamil
12.0	U+11FC0..11FF1, 11FFF	51	L2/13-175	N4477	Sharma, Shriramana (2013-08-09), Response to L2/13-161 on naming Tamil fractions and symbols
12.0	U+11FC0..11FF1, 11FFF	51	L2/13-176	N4478	Sharma, Shriramana (2013-08-24), Request to change one character name from N4430 L2/13-047
12.0	U+11FC0..11FF1, 11FFF	51	L2/13-193		Ganesan, Naga (2013-10-25), Comment on Tamil Nadu Government Request L2/13-161, Use of Tamil Names for Tamil Fractions and Symbols
12.0	U+11FC0..11FF1, 11FFF	51	L2/13-210		Anderson, Deborah; Whistler, Ken; McGowan, Rick; Pournader, Roozbeh (2013-10-31), "6, 7, 8", Recommendations to UTC #137 November 2013 on Script Proposals
12.0	U+11FC0..11FF1, 11FFF	51	L2/13-217		Sharma, Shriramana (2013-11-03), Naming the Tamil fractions and symbols based on the Tamil Lexicon
12.0	U+11FC0..11FF1, 11FFF	51	L2/13-216		Ganesan, Naga (2013-11-04), Feedback from Tamil Experts on Tamil Character Names and Annotations of Symbols and Fractions
12.0	U+11FC0..11FF1, 11FFF	51	L2/14-018	N4526	Sharma, Shriramana (2013-12-20), Spelling changes for Tamil fractions and symbols
12.0	U+11FC0..11FF1, 11FFF	51	L2/14-053		Anderson, Deborah; Whistler, Ken; McGowan, Rick; Pournader, Roozbeh; Iancu, Laurențiu (2014-01-26), "14", Recommendations to UTC #138 February 2014 on Script Proposals
12.0	U+11FC0..11FF1, 11FFF	51	L2/14-037	N4528	Manivannan, Mani; et al. (2014-01-28), Spelling changes for Tamil fractions and symbols
12.0	U+11FC0..11FF1, 11FFF	51	L2/14-038		Nakkeeran, P. R. (2014-01-28), Feedback on Tamil symbols naming scheme
12.0	U+11FC0..11FF1, 11FFF	51		N4403 (pdf, doc)	Umamaheswaran, V. S. (2014-01-28), "10.2.7 Tamil supplement block", Unconfirmed minutes of WG 2 meeting 61, Holiday Inn, Vilnius, Lithuania; 2013-06-10/14
12.0	U+11FC0..11FF1, 11FFF	51	L2/14-048		Comments on the Proposals to Encode Tamil Symbols and Fractions, 2014-01-31
12.0	U+11FC0..11FF1, 11FFF	51	L2/14-160		Sharma, Shriramana (2014-07-18), Reply to L2/14-048 on Tamil fractions
12.0	U+11FC0..11FF1, 11FFF	51	L2/14-170		Anderson, Deborah; Whistler, Ken; McGowan, Rick; Pournader, Roozbeh; Iancu, Laurențiu (2014-07-28), "Tamil", Recommendations to UTC #140 August 2014 on Script Proposals
12.0	U+11FC0..11FF1, 11FFF	51	L2/14-210		Letter on Tamil Fraction Naming, 2014-08-06
12.0	U+11FC0..11FF1, 11FFF	51	L2/14-212		Renganathan, Vasu (2014-09-03), Tamil names and annotations
12.0	U+11FC0..11FF1, 11FFF	51	L2/14-217	N4623	Sharma, Shriramana (2014-09-10), Response to the ICTA's doc L2/14-048 on Tamil fractions and symbols
12.0	U+11FC0..11FF1, 11FFF	51		N4553 (pdf, doc)	Umamaheswaran, V. S. (2014-09-16), "M62.06b, M62.06g", Minutes of WG 2 meeting 62 Adobe, San Jose, CA, USA
12.0	U+11FC0..11FF1, 11FFF	51	L2/14-268R		Anderson, Deborah; Whistler, Ken; McGowan, Rick; Pournader, Roozbeh; Iancu, Laurențiu; Glass, Andrew; Constable, Peter; Suignard, Michel (2014-10-27), "3. Tamil", Recommendations to UTC #141 October 2014 on Script Proposals
12.0	U+11FC0..11FF1, 11FFF	51	L2/14-216	N4622	Sharma, Shriramana (2014-11-10), Current status of Tamil symbols naming issue
12.0	U+11FC0..11FF1, 11FFF	51	L2/14-250		Moore, Lisa (2014-11-10), "Consensus 141-C13", UTC #141 Minutes, "Approve the move of six Tamil archaic characters from U+0BDF, U+0BFB..U+0BFF in the Tamil block to U+11FF0..U+11FF5 in the Tamil Supplement block."
12.0	U+11FC0..11FF1, 11FFF	51	L2/15-003		Ganesan, Naga (2015-01-19), Naming Tamil Symbols in SMP - Vallinam Characters
12.0	U+11FC0..11FF1, 11FFF	51	L2/15-045		Anderson, Deborah; Whistler, Ken; McGowan, Rick; Pournader, Roozbeh; Glass, Andrew (2015-01-30), "1. Tamil", Recommendations to UTC #142 February 2015 on Script Proposals
12.0	U+11FC0..11FF1, 11FFF	51	L2/15-060		Minutes of the 2nd meeting of the TVA High Level Committee on Unicode related issues held on 23rd January 2015, 2015-02-02
12.0	U+11FC0..11FF1, 11FFF	51	L2/15-078		Suignard, Michel (2015-02-04), Proposed Tamil Charts (for Unicode 8.0)
12.0	U+11FC0..11FF1, 11FFF	51	L2/15-079		Pournader, Roozbeh; Anderson, Deborah; Sharma, Alolita; Chew, Patrick (2015-02-05), Proposed name changes to Tamil Supplement block characters
12.0	U+11FC0..11FF1, 11FFF	51	L2/15-017		Moore, Lisa (2015-02-12), "D.2.3", UTC #142 Minutes
12.0	U+11FC0..11FF1, 11FFF	51	L2/15-115		Ganesan, Naga (2015-04-23), Tamil Symbols Names and Annotations – Comments
12.0	U+11FC0..11FF1, 11FFF	51	L2/15-149		Anderson, Deborah; Whistler, Ken; McGowan, Rick; Pournader, Roozbeh; Pandey, Anshuman; Glass, Andrew (2015-05-03), "5. Tamil", Recommendations to UTC #143 May 2015 on Script Proposals
12.0	U+11FC0..11FF1, 11FFF	51	L2/15-176		Jain, Manoj (2015-07-20), Encoding of Tamil fractions and special symbols in Tamil block and a new Tamil Supplement block
12.0	U+11FC0..11FF1, 11FFF	51	L2/15-185		Ramachandran, Thiru T. K. (2015-07-21), Recommendations on Tamil Fractions and special symbols in Unicode - Postponement of decision
12.0	U+11FC0..11FF1, 11FFF	51	L2/15-204		Anderson, Deborah; et al. (2015-07-25), "6.Tamil", Recommendations to UTC #144 July 2015 on Script Proposals
12.0	U+11FC0..11FF1, 11FFF	51	L2/15-187		Moore, Lisa (2015-08-11), "D.2.1", UTC #144 Minutes
12.0	U+11FC0..11FF1, 11FFF	51	L2/16-052	N4603 (pdf, doc)	Umamaheswaran, V. S. (2015-09-01), "M63.03d, 9.1.6, 9.1.7", Unconfirmed minutes of WG 2 meeting 63
12.0	U+11FC0..11FF1, 11FFF	51	L2/16-007		Letter No. 1766/e. Gov.I/2015-15 dated 19.1.2016, 2016-01-19
12.0	U+11FC0..11FF1, 11FFF	51	L2/16-039		Tamil Fraction and symbols encoding proposal, extended feedbacks, 2016-01-25
12.0	U+11FC0..11FF1, 11FFF	51	L2/16-054		Letter No. 1766/e.Gov.I/2015-18 dated 27.1.2016, 2016-01-27
12.0	U+11FC0..11FF1, 11FFF	51	L2/16-004		Moore, Lisa (2016-02-01), "D.8.1 Tamil symbols and fractions", UTC #146 Minutes
12.0	U+11FC0..11FF1, 11FFF	51	L2/16-061		Letter No.1766/e.Gov.I/2015-21 dated 25.02.2016, 2016-02-25
12.0	U+11FC0..11FF1, 11FFF	51	L2/16-062		Tamil Fraction and symbols encoding proposal -- Extended feedbacks, 2016-02-25
12.0	U+11FC0..11FF1, 11FFF	51	L2/16-083		Ganesan, Naga (2016-04-20), Tamil Symbols: Comment on L2/16-062
12.0	U+11FC0..11FF1, 11FFF	51	L2/16-114		Sharma, Shriramana (2016-05-02), Feedback on the GoTN's document L2/16-062 on Tamil fractions and symbols
12.0	U+11FC0..11FF1, 11FFF	51	L2/16-155 (pdf, xlsx)		Anderson, Deborah; et al. (2016-05-06), Script Ad Hoc Recommendations on Tamil Fractions and Symbols
12.0	U+11FC0..11FF1, 11FFF	51	L2/16-121		Moore, Lisa (2016-05-20), "D.8.1.4", UTC #147 Minutes
12.0	U+11FC0..11FF1, 11FFF	51	L2/17-069	N4822	Finalized proposal to encode Tamil fractions and symbols (with cover letter), 2017-03-15
12.0	U+11FC0..11FF1, 11FFF	51	L2/17-114		Ganesan, Naga (2017-04-27), Comment on L2/17-069: Tamil Fractions and Symbols
12.0	U+11FC0..11FF1, 11FFF	51	L2/17-153		Anderson, Deborah (2017-05-17), "7. Tamil", Recommendations to UTC #151 May 2017 on Script Proposals
12.0	U+11FC0..11FF1, 11FFF	51	L2/17-103		Moore, Lisa (2017-05-18), "D.8 Tamil", UTC #151 Minutes
12.0	U+11FC0..11FF1, 11FFF	51	L2/18-336		Lodewijck, Marc (2018-12-02), Comment on spelling of 11FD8 character name
12.0	U+11FC0..11FF1, 11FFF	51	L2/19-047		Anderson, Deborah; et al. (2019-01-13), "14", Recommendations to UTC #158 January 2019 on Script Proposals
12.0	U+11FC0..11FF1, 11FFF	51	L2/19-008		Moore, Lisa (2019-02-08), "B.11.10.1.2 Comment on spelling of 11FD8 character name", UTC #158 Minutes, "Consensus: Change the name of U+11FD8 from TAMIL SIGN UZHAAKKU to TAMIL SIGN UZHAKKU."
