= Kollywood (disambiguation) =

Kollywood may refer to:

- Tamil cinema, production of motion pictures in the Tamil-language, based in Kodambakkam, Chennai, India
- Kurukh cinema, production of motion pictures in the Kurukh language in India
- Cinema of Nepal, nickname for production of motion pictures in Kathmandu, Nepal in Nepali language

== See also ==
- Tamil cinema (disambiguation)
