= Welcome to Mollywood =

Welcome to Mollywood may refer to:

- Welcome to Mollywood, a 2010 autobiography by Molly Parkin.
- Welcome to Mollywood, a 2012 mixtape by JasonMartin
- Welcome to Mollywood, a provisional name for the American children's sitcom, Sonny with a Chance

== See also ==
- Welcome to Hollywood, a mockumentary released in 2000
