= Tamil nationalism (disambiguation) =

Tamil nationalism is an ideology promoting ethnic nationalism among the Tamil people of India and Sri Lanka.

It may specifically refer to:

- Tamil nationalism (India)
- Sri Lankan Tamil nationalism
