= Westpac Indian Film Festival of Sydney =

Indian Film Festival of Sydney
- Genre: Film festival
- Locations: Sydney, Australia
- Inaugurated: 2010
- Website: indianfilmfestival.com.au

The Indian Film Festival of Sydney – Bollywood and Beyond is a film festival held in Sydney. The director of festival is Mitu Bhowmick Lange .

== History ==
The festival was founded in 2010 as 'Bollywood and Beyond' . The festival has not been a regular event every year. Westpac is the named partner of the Indian Film Festival of Sydney.

In May 2012, The Sydney Morning Herald accused the Indian Film Festival of Sydney of programming overlap with the State Government of Victoria funded Indian Film Festival of Melbourne (IFFM); they stated that many guests and films in the privately organised Indian Film Festival of Sydney, have also appeared at the tax payer funded IFFM.

== Festival Guests ==
WIFFS 2011 featured as its opening night film No One Killed Jessica, with the film's director Raj Kumar Gupta as a festival guest.

WIFFS 2012 featured guests Malaika Arora Khan and film-maker Rituparno Ghosh, with the opening night film being Ghosh's Chitrangada.

WIFFS 2016 featured Angry Indian Goddesses, with actors Tannishtha Chatterjee, Rituparna Sengupta and director Srijit Mukherji in attendance.

WIFFS 2017 opening night film was the Australian premiere of Onir's Shab, which was presented by the director and actor Raveena Tandon.
