= Tamil script =

Brahmic script

Tamil தமிழ்
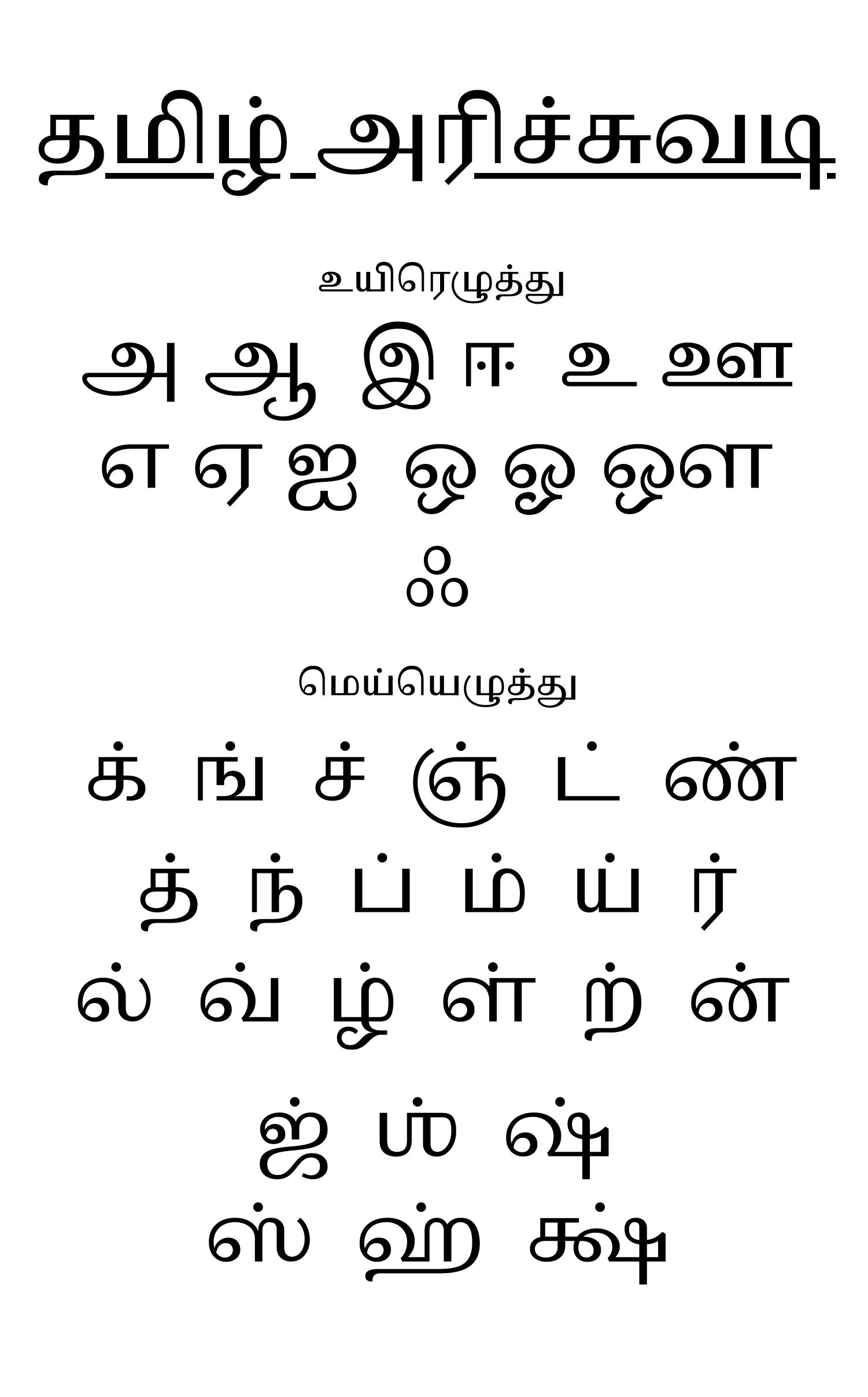
- Tamil script (Tamiḻ ariccuvaṭi)
- Script type: Abugida
- Period: c. 7th century CE – present
- Direction: Left-to-right
- Languages: Tamil; Kanikkaran; Badaga; Irula; Paniya; Saurashtra

Related scripts
- Parent systems: Egyptian: Proto-Sinaitic; Phoenician; Aramaic; Brahmi script; Tamil Brahmi; Pallava script; Tamil
- Sister systems: Grantha, Old Mon, Khmer, Cham, Kawi

ISO 15924
- ISO 15924: Taml (346), Tamil

Unicode
- Unicode alias: Tamil
- Unicode range: U+0B80–U+0BFF Tamil; U+11FC0–U+11FFF Tamil Supplement

The Tamil script (தமிழ் அரிச்சுவடி Tamiḻ ariccuvaṭi [tamiɻ ˈaɾitːɕuʋaɽi]) is an abugida script that is used by Tamils and Tamil speakers in India, Sri Lanka, Malaysia, Singapore and elsewhere to write the Tamil language. It is one of the official scripts of the Indian Republic. Certain minority languages such as Saurashtra, Badaga, Irula and Paniya are also rendered in the Tamil script.

== Characteristics ==
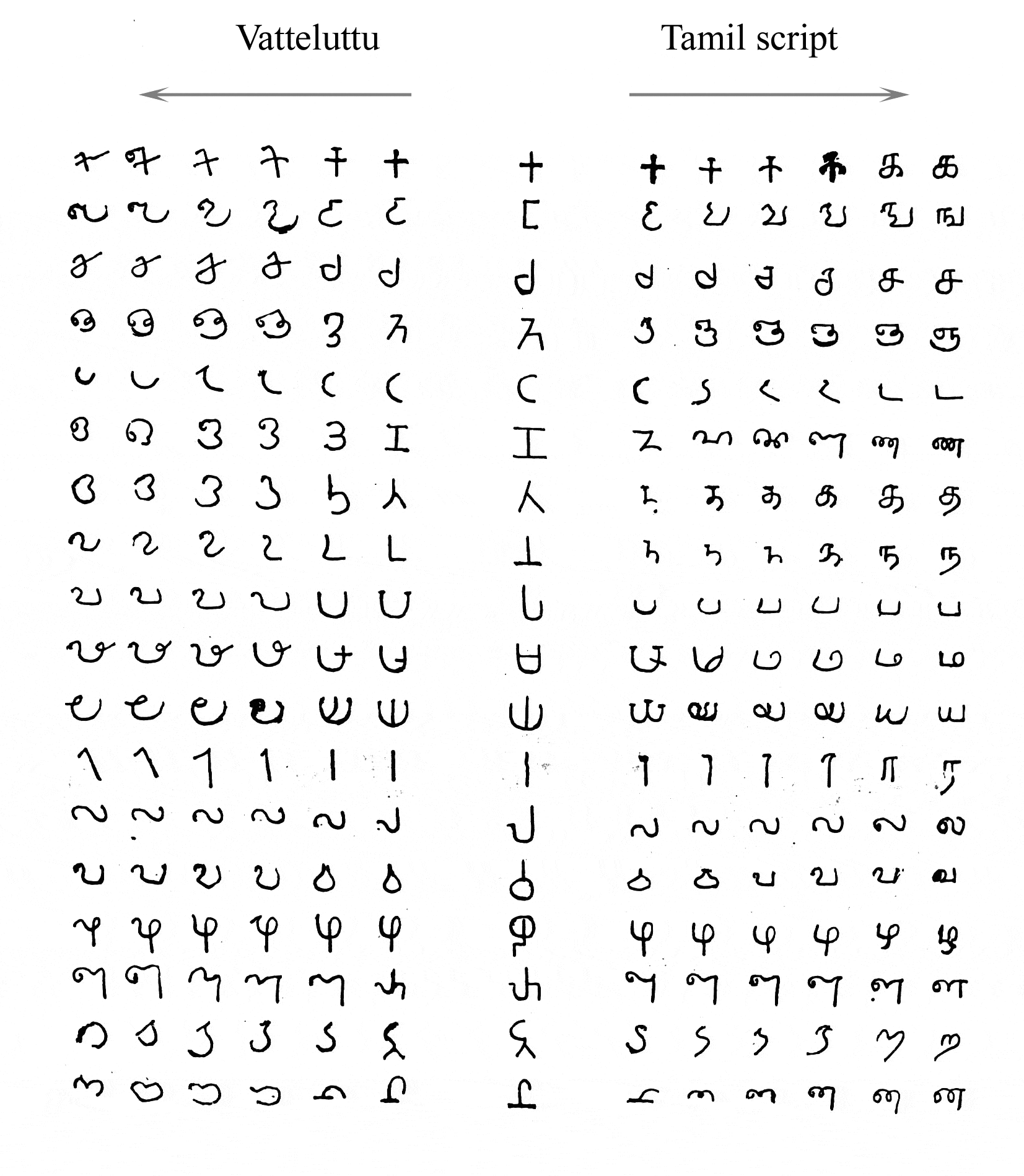
Diverging evolution of Tamil-Brahmi script (center column) into the Vatteluttu alphabet (leftmost column) and the Tamil script (rightmost column)

The Tamil script has 12 vowels (உயிரெழுத்து, uyireḻuttu, "soul-letters"), 18 consonants (மெய்யெழுத்து, meyyeḻuttu, "body-letters") and one special character, the ஃ (ஆய்த எழுத்து, āytha eḻuttu). ஃ is called "அக்கு", akku, and is classified in Tamil orthography as being neither a consonant nor a vowel. However, it is listed at the end of the vowel set. The script is syllabic, not alphabetic, and is written from left to right.

== History ==
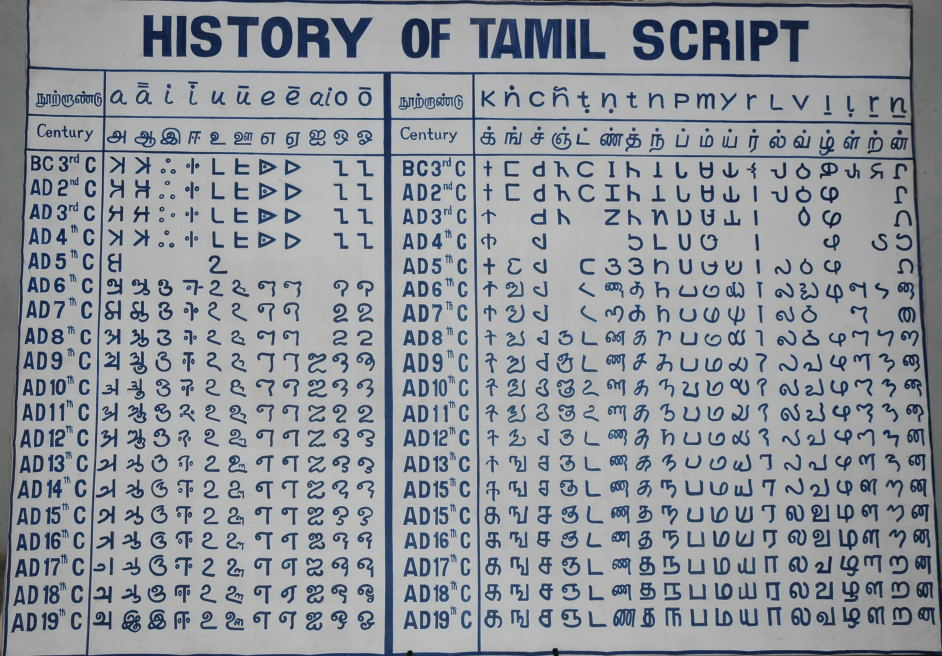
Historical evolution of Tamil writing from the earlier Tamil-Brahmi near the top to the current Tamil script at bottom

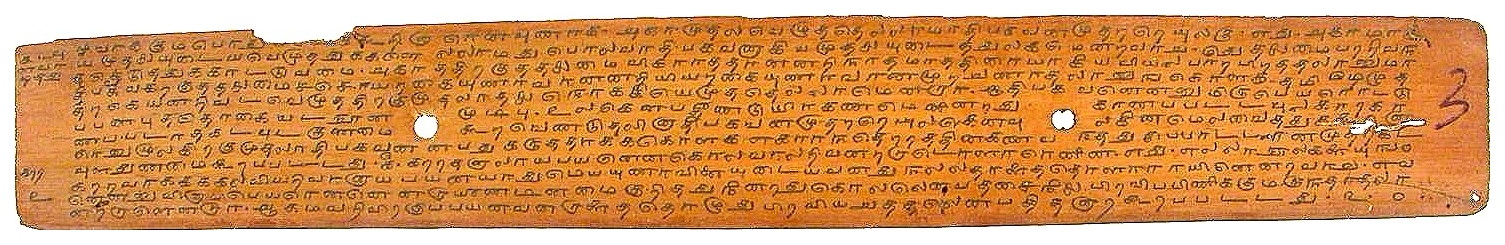
Tirukkural palm leaf manuscript

The Tamil script, like the other Brahmic scripts, is thought to have evolved from the original Brahmi script. The earliest inscriptions which are accepted examples of Tamil writing date to the Ashokan period. The script used by such inscriptions is commonly known as the Tamil-Brahmi or "Tamili script" and differs in many ways from standard Ashokan Brahmi. For example, early Tamil-Brahmi, unlike Ashokan Brahmi, had a system to distinguish between pure consonants (m, in this example) and consonants with an inherent vowel (ma, in this example). In addition, according to Iravatham Mahadevan, early Tamil Brahmi used slightly different vowel markers, had extra characters to represent letters not found in Sanskrit and omitted letters for sounds not present in Tamil such as voiced consonants and aspirates. Inscriptions from the 2nd century use a later form of Tamil-Brahmi, which is substantially similar to the writing system described in the Tolkāppiyam, an ancient Tamil grammar. Most notably, they used the puḷḷi to suppress the inherent vowel. The Tamil letters thereafter evolved towards a more rounded form and by the 5th or 6th century, they had reached a form called the early vaṭṭeḻuttu.

The modern Tamil script does not, however, descend from that script. In the 7th century, a new script for Tamil was formed in the Pallava Kingdom, created by the simplification of Pallava-Grantha letters and adding additional Vaṭṭeḻuttu letters to be able to write some necessary sounds. By the 8th century, the new Tamil script supplanted Vaṭṭeḻuttu in the Pallava and Chola kingdoms which lay in the north portion of the Tamil-speaking region. However, Vaṭṭeḻuttu continued to be used in the southern portion of the Tamil-speaking region, in the Chera and Pandyan kingdoms until the 11th century, when the Pandyan kingdom was conquered by the Cholas who inherited while being feudatory of Pallavas for a short time. Francis (2024) distinguishes the Grantha and Tamil alphabets as two closely related writing systems that were used for Sanskrit and Tamil respectively, while noting that the correspondence between language and script was not absolute: Sanskrit loanwords could be written with Grantha graphemes within otherwise Tamil inscriptions, and Tamil words would rarely be written in Grantha. Lockwood (2008) uses the terms “Grantha Sanskrit” and “Grantha Tamil” for the two related scripts, and more specifically “Pallava Grantha Sanskrit” and “Pallava Grantha Tamil” for their Pallava-period forms. He notes that the two forms were closely related, with corresponding letters deriving from the same Brāhmī source forms, but that individual letters could nevertheless differ in their shapes and orthographic functions. Lockwood states that the Pallava Grantha Tamil script was subsequently adopted by the Cholas and became the direct basis of the modern Tamil script.

The use of palm leaves as the primary medium for writing led to changes in the script. The scribe had to be careful not to pierce the leaves with the stylus while writing because a leaf with a hole was more likely to tear and decay faster. As a result, the use of the puḷḷi to distinguish pure consonants became rare, with pure consonants usually being written as if the inherent vowel were present. Similarly, the vowel marker (ஃ) called: Tamil: குற்றியலுகரம், romanized: kuṟṟiyal-ukaram, lit. 'short 'u'-sound', a half-rounded u which occurs at the end of some words and in the medial position in certain compound words, marking a shortened u sound, also fell out of use and was replaced by the marker for the simple u (ு). The puḷḷi (ஂ) did not fully reappear until the introduction of printing, but the marker kuṟṟiyal-ukaram (ஃ) never came back for this purpose into use although its usage is retained in certain grammatical conceptual words whereas the sound itself still exists and plays an important role in Tamil prosody.

The forms of some of the letters were simplified in the 19th century to make the script easier to typeset. In the 20th century, the script was simplified even further in a series of reforms, which regularised the vowel markers used with consonants by eliminating special markers and most irregular forms.

== Relationship with other Indic scripts ==
The Tamil script differs from other Brahmi-derived scripts in a number of ways. Unlike every other Brahmic script, it does not regularly represent voiced or aspirated stop consonants as these are not phonemes of the Tamil language even though voiced and fricative allophones of stops do appear in spoken Tamil. Thus the character க் k, for example, represents /k/ but can also be pronounced [g] or [x] based on the rules of Tamil phonology. A separate set of characters appears for these sounds when the Tamil script is used to write Sanskrit or other languages.

Also unlike other Brahmi scripts, the Tamil script rarely uses typographic ligatures to represent conjunct consonants, which are far less frequent in Tamil than in other Indian languages. Where they occur, conjunct consonants are written by writing the character for the first consonant, adding the puḷḷi to suppress its inherent vowel, and then writing the character for the second consonant. There are a few exceptions, namely க்ஷ kṣa and ஶ்ரீ śrī.

ISO 15919 is an international standard for the transliteration of Tamil and other Indic scripts into Latin characters. It uses diacritics to map the much larger set of Brahmic consonants and vowels to the Latin script.

== Letters ==
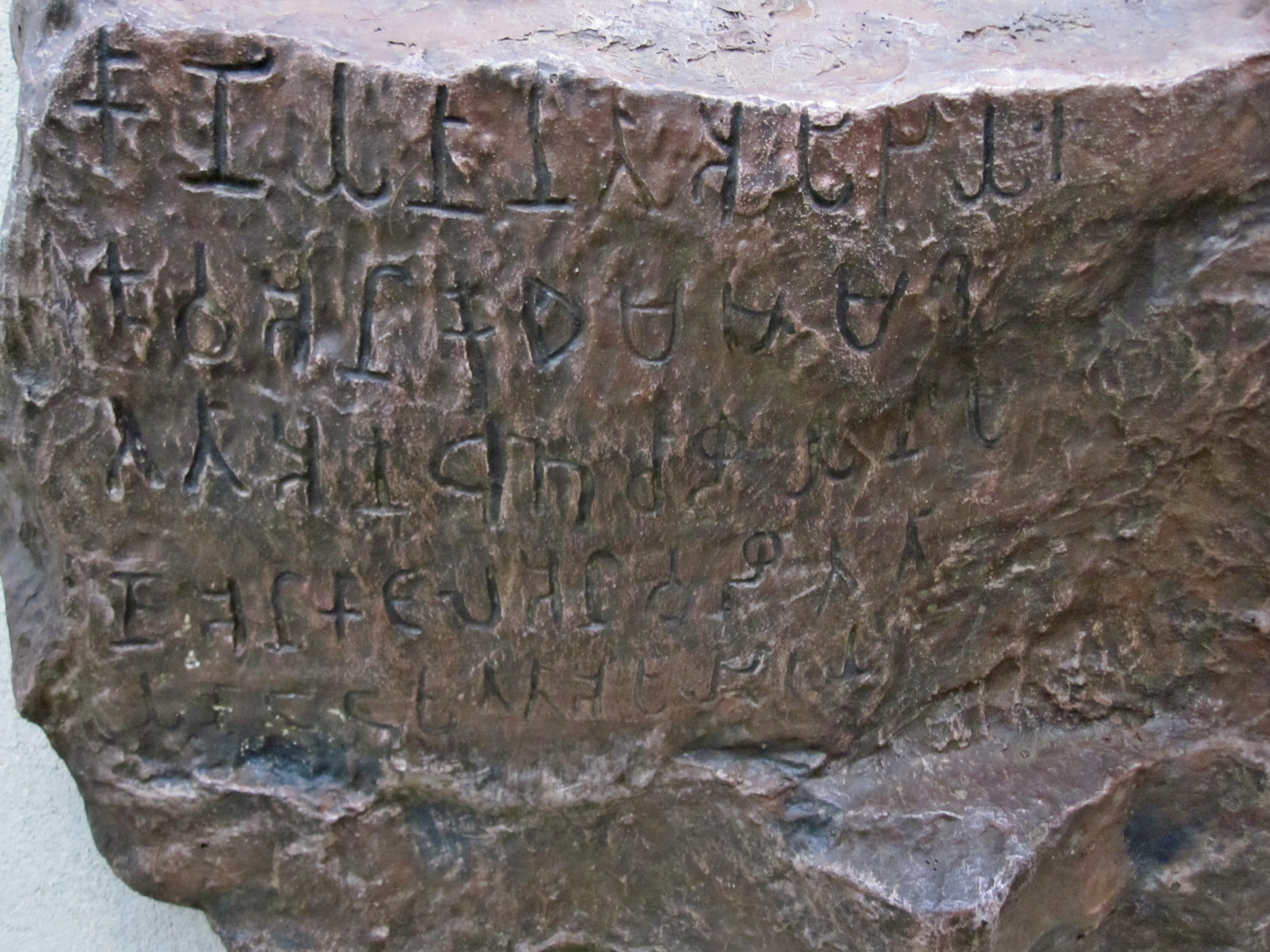
Mangulam Tamili inscription in Mangulam, Madurai district, Tamil Nadu dated to Tamil Sangam period c. 400 BCE to c. 200 CE.

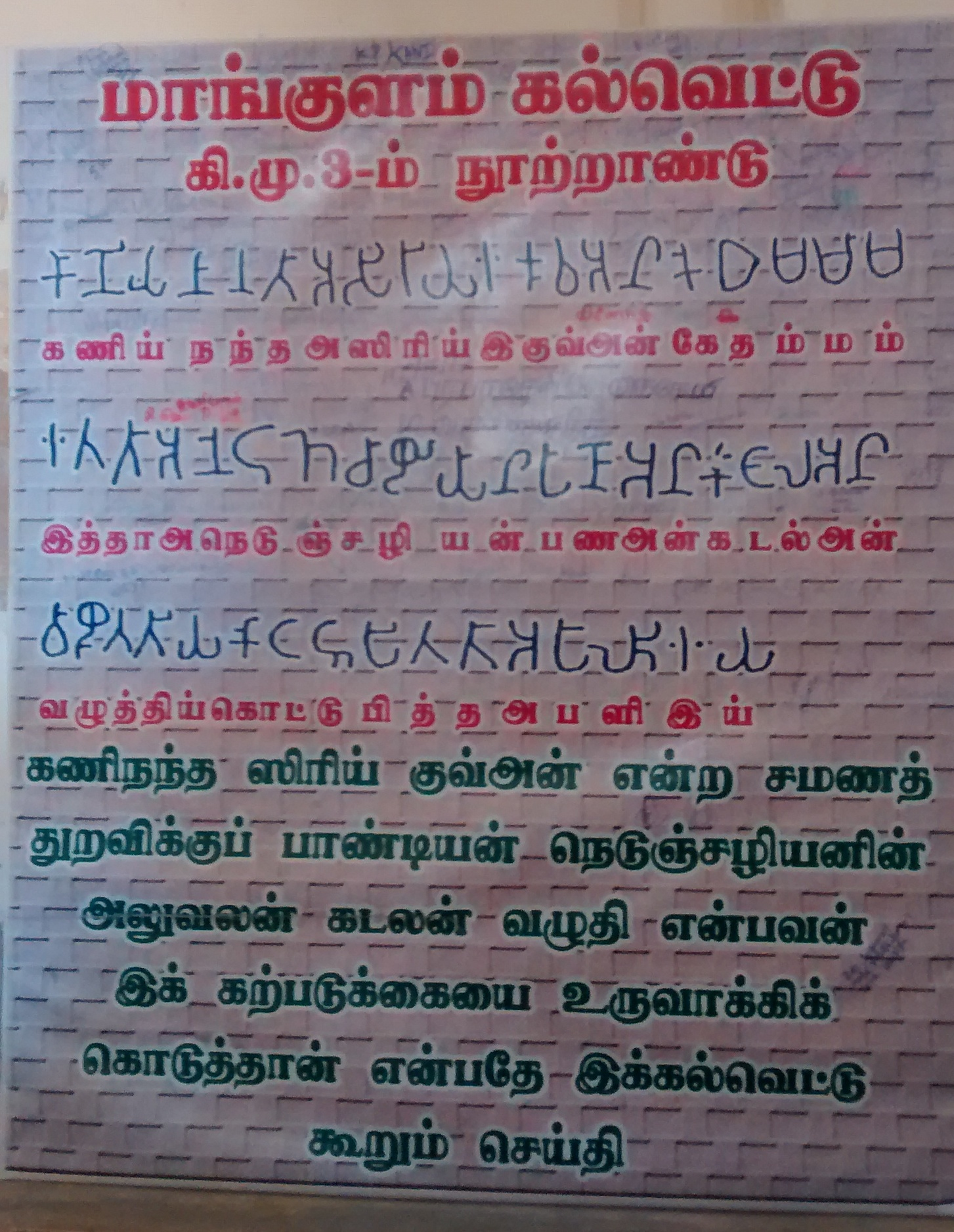
Explanation for Mangulam Tamil Brahmi inscription in Mangulam, Madurai district, Tamil Nadu dated to Tamil Sangam period c. 400 BCE to c. 200 CE.

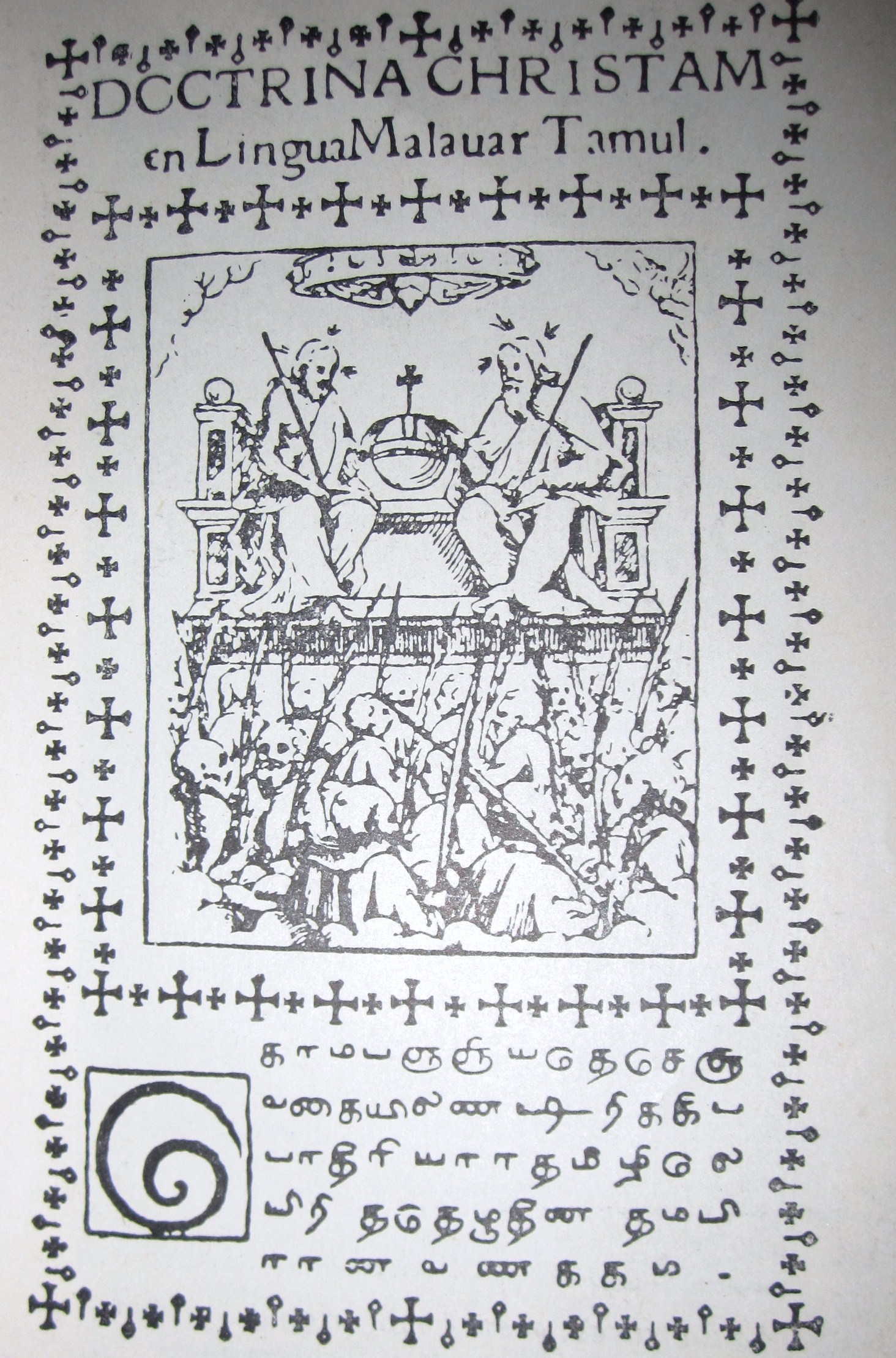
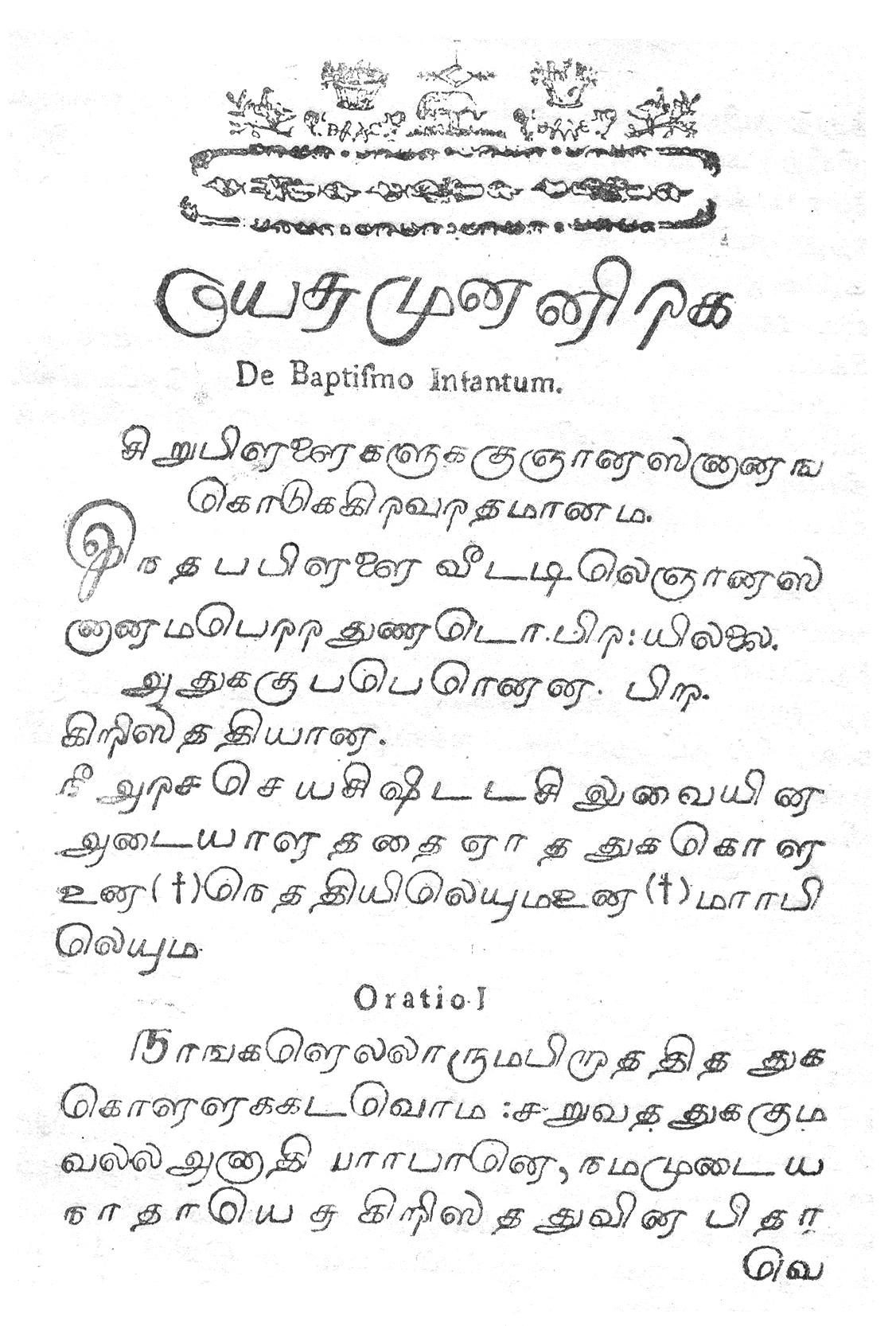
Left: Tampiran Vanakkam (Doctrina Christum) was the first book in Tamil, printed on 20 October 1578. Right: A book in Tamil printed in 1781.

=== Basic consonants ===
Consonants are called the "body" (mei) letters. The consonants are classified into three categories: vallinam (hard consonants), mellinam (soft consonants, including all nasals), and itayinam (medium consonants).

There are some lexical rules for the formation of words. The Tolkāppiyam describes such rules. Some examples: a word cannot end in certain consonants, and cannot begin with some consonants including r-, l- and ḻ-; there are six nasal consonants in Tamil: a velar nasal ங், a palatal nasal ஞ், a retroflex nasal ண், a dental nasal ந், a bilabial nasal ம், and an alveolar nasal ன்.

The order of the alphabet (strictly abugida) in Tamil closely matches that of the nearby languages both in location and linguistics, reflecting the common origin of their scripts from Brahmi.

Tamil language has 18 consonants - mey eluttukkal. Traditional grammarians have classified these 18 into three groups of 6 letters each. This classification is done based on the method of articulation and hence the nature of these letters. Vallinam (hard group), mellinam (soft group) and idaiyinam (medium group). All consonants are pronounced for a half unit (māttirai) time length when isolated (consonants combined with vowels will be pronounced with the time length of the vowel).

Tamil consonants
Consonant	ISO 15919	Category	IPA
க்	k	vallinam	/k/
ங்	ṅ	mellinam	/ŋ/
ச்	c	vallinam	/t͡ʃ, s/
ஞ்	ñ	mellinam	/ɲ/
ட்	ṭ	vallinam	/ʈ/
ண்	ṇ	mellinam	/ɳ/
த்	t	vallinam	/t̪/
ந்	n	mellinam	/n̪/
ப்	p	vallinam	/p/
ம்	m	mellinam	/m/
ய்	y	idaiyinam	/j/
ர்	r	idaiyinam	/ɾ/
ல்	l	idaiyinam	/l̪/
வ்	v	idaiyinam	/v/
ழ்	ḻ	idaiyinam	/ɻ/
ள்	ḷ	idaiyinam	/ɭ/
ற்	ṟ	vallinam	/r/
ன்	ṉ	mellinam	/n/

=== Extra consonants used in Tamil ===
The Tamil speech has incorporated many phonemes that were not part of the Tolkāppiyam classification. The letters used to represent these sounds, known as Grantha, are regarded as supplementary to the standard alphabet. They are taught from elementary school and are incorporated in Tamil All Character Encoding (TACE16).

Grantha consonants in Tamil
Consonant	ISO 15919	IPA
ஜ்	j	/d͡ʒ/
ஶ்	ś	/ʃ/
ஷ்	ṣ	/ʂ/
ஸ்	s	/s/
ஹ்	h	/h/
க்ஷ்	kṣ	/kʂ/

There is also the ligature ஶ்ரீ (śrī), equivalent to श्री in Devanagari.

Combinations of consonants with ஃ (ஆய்த எழுத்து, āyda eḻuttu, equivalent to nuqta) are occasionally used to represent phonemes of foreign languages, especially to write Islamic and Christian texts. For example: asif = அசிஃப், azārutīn̠ = அஃஜாருதீன், Genghis Khan = கெங்கிஸ் ஃகான்.

A nuqta-like diacritic is used while writing the Badaga language and double dot nuqta for the Irula language to transcribe its sounds.

There has also been effort to differentiate voiced and voiceless consonants through subscripted numbers – two, three, and four which stand for the unvoiced aspirated, voiced, voiced aspirated respectively. This was used to transcribe Sanskrit words in Sanskrit–Tamil books, as shown in the table below.

க ka	க₂ kha	க₃ ga	க₄ gha
ச ca	ச₂ cha	ஜ ja	ஜ₂ jha
ட ṭa	ட₂ ṭha	ட₃ ḍa	ட₄ ḍha
த ta	த₂ tha	த₃ da	த₄ dha
ப pa	ப₂ pha	ப₃ ba	ப₄ bha

The Unicode Standard uses superscripted digits for the same purpose, as in ப² pha, ப³ ba, and ப⁴ bha.

=== Vowels ===
Vowels are also called the 'life' (uyir) or 'soul' letters. Together with the consonants (mei, which are called 'body' letters), they form compound, syllabic (abugida) letters that are called 'living' or 'embodied' letters (uyir mei, i.e. letters that have both 'body' and 'soul').

Tamil language has 12 vowels which are divided into short and long (five of each type) and two diphthongs.

Tamil vowels
Independent	Vowel sign	ISO 15919	IPA
அ	—N/a	a	/ɐ/
ஆ	ா	ā	/aː/
இ	ி	i	/i/
ஈ	ீ	ī	/iː/
உ	ு	u	/u/
ஊ	ூ	ū	/uː/
எ	ெ	e	/e/
ஏ	ே	ē	/eː/
ஐ	ை	ai	/ɐi̯/
ஒ	ொ	o	/o/
ஓ	ோ	ō	/oː/
ஔ	ௌ	au	/ɐu̯/

==== Compound form ====
Using the consonant 'k' as an example:

Formation	Compound form	ISO 15919	IPA
க் + அ	க	ka	/kɐ/
க் + ஆ	கா	kā	/kaː/
க் + இ	கி	ki	/ki/
க் + ஈ	கீ	kī	/kiː/
க் + உ	கு	ku	/ku/
க் + ஊ	கூ	kū	/kuː/
க் + எ	கெ	ke	/ke/
க் + ஏ	கே	kē	/keː/
க் + ஐ	கை	kai	/kɐi̯/
க் + ஒ	கொ	ko	/ko/
க் + ஓ	கோ	kō	/koː/
க் + ஔ	கௌ	kau	/kɐu̯/

The special letter ஃ, represented by three dots, is called āyta eḻuttu or aḵ. It originally represented an archaic Tamil retention of the Dravidian sound ḥ, which has been lost in almost all modern Dravidian languages, and in Tamil traditionally serves a purely grammatical function, but in modern times it has come to be used as a diacritic to represent foreign sounds. For example, ஃப is used for the English sound f, not found in Tamil. It also served before palm leaves became the primary writing medium for words ending with an inherent consonsant-vowel u as a pronouncing rule for a short u, called – Tamil: குற்றியலுகரம், romanized: kuṟṟiyal-ukaram, lit. 'short 'u'-sound'. Following consonants rendered this behaviour: கு, சு, டு, து, பு, று. Instead of writing like in modern days without any markers, for example (Tamil: அது, romanized: Atu), it was written with a preceding ஃ, like – Tamil: அஃது, romanized: Aḥtu.

Another symbol ஂ, represented by a small hollow circle and called Aṉuvara, is the Anusvara, now obsolete in Tamil. It was traditionally used as a homorganic nasal when in front of a consonant, and either as a bilabial nasal (m) or alveolar nasal (n) at the end of a word, depending on the context.

The long (nedil) vowels are about twice as long as the short (kuṟil) vowels. The diphthongs are usually pronounced about one and a half times as long as the short vowels, though some grammatical texts place them with the long (nedil) vowels.

As can be seen in the compound form, the vowel sign can be added to the right, left or both sides of the consonants. It can also form a ligature. These rules are evolving and older use has more ligatures than modern use. What you actually see on this page depends on your font selection; for example, Code2000 will show more ligatures than Latha.

There are proponents of script reform who want to eliminate all ligatures and let all vowel signs appear on the right side.

Unicode encodes the character in logical order (always the consonant first), whereas legacy 8-bit encodings (such as TSCII) prefer the written order. This makes it necessary to reorder when converting from one encoding to another; it is not sufficient simply to map one set of code points to the other.

==== Compound table of Tamil letters ====
The following table lists vowel (uyir or life) letters across the top and consonant (mei or body) letters along the side, the combination of which gives all Tamil compound (uyirmei) letters.

Tolkāppiyam consonants		Vowels											
Tolkāppiyam consonants		∅ a	ா ā	ி i	ீ ī	ு u	ூ ū	ெ e	ே ē	ை ai	ொ o	ோ ō	ௌ au
∅ (Independent)		அ	ஆ	இ	ஈ	உ	ஊ	எ	ஏ	ஐ	ஒ	ஓ	ஔ
க்	k	க	கா	கி	கீ	கு	கூ	கெ	கே	கை	கொ	கோ	கௌ
ங்	ṅ	ங	ஙா	ஙி	ஙீ	ஙு	ஙூ	ஙெ	ஙே	ஙை	ஙொ	ஙோ	ஙௌ
ச்	c	ச	சா	சி	சீ	சு	சூ	செ	சே	சை	சொ	சோ	சௌ
ஞ்	ñ	ஞ	ஞா	ஞி	ஞீ	ஞு	ஞூ	ஞெ	ஞே	ஞை	ஞொ	ஞோ	ஞௌ
ட்	ṭ	ட	டா	டி	டீ	டு	டூ	டெ	டே	டை	டொ	டோ	டௌ
ண்	ṇ	ண	ணா	ணி	ணீ	ணு	ணூ	ணெ	ணே	ணை	ணொ	ணோ	ணௌ
த்	t	த	தா	தி	தீ	து	தூ	தெ	தே	தை	தொ	தோ	தௌ
ந்	n	ந	நா	நி	நீ	நு	நூ	நெ	நே	நை	நொ	நோ	நௌ
ப்	p	ப	பா	பி	பீ	பு	பூ	பெ	பே	பை	பொ	போ	பௌ
ம்	m	ம	மா	மி	மீ	மு	மூ	மெ	மே	மை	மொ	மோ	மௌ
ய்	y	ய	யா	யி	யீ	யு	யூ	யெ	யே	யை	யொ	யோ	யௌ
ர்	r	ர	ரா	ரி	ரீ	ரு	ரூ	ரெ	ரே	ரை	ரொ	ரோ	ரௌ
ல்	l	ல	லா	லி	லீ	லு	லூ	லெ	லே	லை	லொ	லோ	லௌ
வ்	v	வ	வா	வி	வீ	வு	வூ	வெ	வே	வை	வொ	வோ	வௌ
ழ்	ḻ	ழ	ழா	ழி	ழீ	ழு	ழூ	ழெ	ழே	ழை	ழொ	ழோ	ழௌ
ள்	ḷ	ள	ளா	ளி	ளீ	ளு	ளூ	ளெ	ளே	ளை	ளொ	ளோ	ளௌ
ற்	ṟ	ற	றா	றி	றீ	று	றூ	றெ	றே	றை	றொ	றோ	றௌ
ன்	ṉ	ன	னா	னி	னீ	னு	னூ	னெ	னே	னை	னொ	னோ	னௌ

Grantha compound table
Grantha consonants		Vowels											
Grantha consonants		∅ a	ா ā	ி i	ீ ī	ு u	ூ ū	ெ e	ே ē	ை ai	ொ o	ோ ō	ௌ au
ஶ்	ś	ஶ	ஶா	ஶி	ஶீ	ஶு	ஶூ	ஶெ	ஶே	ஶை	ஶொ	ஶோ	ஶௌ
ஜ்	j	ஜ	ஜா	ஜி	ஜீ	ஜு	ஜூ	ஜெ	ஜே	ஜை	ஜொ	ஜோ	ஜௌ
ஷ்	ṣ	ஷ	ஷா	ஷி	ஷீ	ஷு	ஷூ	ஷெ	ஷே	ஷை	ஷொ	ஷோ	ஷௌ
ஸ்	s	ஸ	ஸா	ஸி	ஸீ	ஸு	ஸூ	ஸெ	ஸே	ஸை	ஸொ	ஸோ	ஸௌ
ஹ்	h	ஹ	ஹா	ஹி	ஹீ	ஹு	ஹூ	ஹெ	ஹே	ஹை	ஹொ	ஹோ	ஹௌ
க்ஷ்	kṣ	க்ஷ	க்ஷா	க்ஷி	க்ஷீ	க்ஷு	க்ஷூ	க்ஷெ	க்ஷே	க்ஷை	க்ஷொ	க்ஷோ	க்ஷௌ

=== Writing order ===
Vowels (uyireḻuttu)
Letter	Animation
அ (a)	
ஆ (ā)	
இ (i)	
ஈ (ī)	
உ (u)	
ஊ (ū)	
எ (e)	
ஏ (ē)	
ஐ (ai)	
ஒ (o)	
ஓ (ō)	
ஔ (au)	
ஃ (aḵ)*	
*ஃ is aytam but traditionally grouped with the vowel letters.

Consonants (meyyeḻuttu)
Letter	Animation
க் (k)	
ங் (ṅ)	
ச் (ch)	
ஞ் (ñ)	
ட் (t)	
ண் (ṇ)	
த் (th)	
ந் (n)	
ப் (p)	
ம் (m)	
ய் (y)	
ர் (r)	
ல் (l)	
வ் (v)	
ழ் (ḻ)	
ள் (ḷ)	
ற் (ṟ)	
ன் (ṉ)	

== Numerals and symbols ==
Apart from the usual numerals (from 0 to 9), Tamil also has numerals for 10, 100 and 1000. Symbols for fraction and other number-based concepts can also be found.

0	1	2	3	4	5	6	7	8	9	10	100	1000
௦	௧	௨	௩	௪	௫	௬	௭	௮	௯	௰	௱	௲

day	month	year	debit	credit	as above	rupee	numeral	time	quantity
௳	௴	௵	௶	௷	௸	௹	௺	ள	வ

== Unicode ==
Tamil script was added to the Unicode Standard in October 1991 with the release of version 1.0.0. The Unicode block for Tamil is U+0B80–U+0BFF. Grey areas indicate non-assigned code points. Most of the non-assigned code points are designated reserved because they are in the same relative position as characters assigned in other South Asian script blocks that correspond to phonemes that don't exist in the Tamil script.

Efforts to unify the Grantha script with Tamil have been made; however the proposals triggered discontent by some. Eventually, considering the sensitivity involved, it was determined that the two scripts should be encoded independently, except for the numerals.

Tamil^{[1]}^{[2]} Official Unicode Consortium code chart (PDF)
	0	1	2	3	4	5	6	7	8	9	A	B	C	D	E	F
U+0B8x			ஂ	ஃ		அ	ஆ	இ	ஈ	உ	ஊ				எ	ஏ
U+0B9x	ஐ		ஒ	ஓ	ஔ	க				ங	ச		ஜ		ஞ	ட
U+0BAx				ண	த				ந	ன	ப				ம	ய
U+0BBx	ர	ற	ல	ள	ழ	வ	ஶ	ஷ	ஸ	ஹ					ா	ி
U+0BCx	ீ	ு	ூ				ெ	ே	ை		ொ	ோ	ௌ	்		
U+0BDx	ௐ							ௗ								
U+0BEx							௦	௧	௨	௩	௪	௫	௬	௭	௮	௯
U+0BFx	௰	௱	௲	௳	௴	௵	௶	௷	௸	௹	௺					
Notes 1.As of Unicode version 18.0 2.Grey areas indicate non-assigned code points

Proposals to encode characters used for fractional values in traditional accounting practices were submitted. Although discouraged by the ICTA of Sri Lanka, the proposal was recognized by the Government of Tamil Nadu and were added to the Unicode Standard in March 2019 with the release of version 12.0. The Unicode block for Tamil Supplement is U+11FC0–U+11FFF:

Tamil Supplement^{[1]}^{[2]} Official Unicode Consortium code chart (PDF)
	0	1	2	3	4	5	6	7	8	9	A	B	C	D	E	F
U+11FCx	𑿀	𑿁	𑿂	𑿃	𑿄	𑿅	𑿆	𑿇	𑿈	𑿉	𑿊	𑿋	𑿌	𑿍	𑿎	𑿏
U+11FDx	𑿐	𑿑	𑿒	𑿓	𑿔	𑿕	𑿖	𑿗	𑿘	𑿙	𑿚	𑿛	𑿜	𑿝	𑿞	𑿟
U+11FEx	𑿠	𑿡	𑿢	𑿣	𑿤	𑿥	𑿦	𑿧	𑿨	𑿩	𑿪	𑿫	𑿬	𑿭	𑿮	𑿯
U+11FFx	𑿰	𑿱														𑿿
Notes 1.As of Unicode version 18.0 2.Grey areas indicate non-assigned code points

=== Syllabary ===
Like other South Asian scripts in Unicode, the Tamil encoding was originally derived from the ISCII standard. Both ISCII and Unicode encode Tamil as an abugida. In an abugida, each basic character represents a consonant and default vowel. Consonants with a different vowel or bare consonants are represented by adding a modifier character to a base character. Each code point representing a similar phoneme is encoded in the same relative position in each South Asian script block in Unicode, including Tamil. Because Unicode represents Tamil as an abugida all the pure consonants (consonants with no associated vowel) and syllables in Tamil can be represented by combining multiple Unicode code points, as can be seen in the Unicode Tamil Syllabary below. In Unicode 5.1, named sequences were added for all Tamil consonants and syllables.

Unicode 5.1 also has a named sequence for the Tamil ligature SRI (śrī), ஶ்ரீ, written using ஶ (śa). The name of this sequence is TAMIL SYLLABLE SHRII and is composed of the Unicode sequence U+0BB6 U+0BCD U+0BB0 U+0BC0. The ligature can also be written using ஸ (sa) to create an identical ligature ஸ்ரீ composed of the Unicode sequence U+0BB8 U+0BCD U+0BB0 U+0BC0; but this is discouraged by the Unicode standard.

Unicode Tamil Syllabary
Consonants	Vowels											
Consonants	அ 0B85	ஆ 0B86	இ 0B87	ஈ 0B88	உ 0B89	ஊ 0B8A	எ 0B8E	ஏ 0B8F	ஐ 0B90	ஒ 0B92	ஓ 0B93	ஔ 0B94
க் 0B95 0BCD	க 0B95	கா 0B95; 0BBE	கி 0B95; 0BBF	கீ 0B95; 0BC0	கு 0B95; 0BC1	கூ 0B95; 0BC2	கெ 0B95; 0BC6	கே 0B95; 0BC7	கை 0B95; 0BC8	கொ 0B95; 0BCA	கோ 0B95; 0BCB	கௌ 0B95; 0BCC
ங் 0B99 0BCD	ங 0B99	ஙா 0B99; 0BBE	ஙி 0B99; 0BBF	ஙீ 0B99; 0BC0	ஙு 0B99; 0BC1	ஙூ 0B99; 0BC2	ஙெ 0B99; 0BC6	ஙே 0B99; 0BC7	ஙை 0B99; 0BC8	ஙொ 0B99; 0BCA	ஙோ 0B99; 0BCB	ஙௌ 0B99; 0BCC
ச் 0B9A 0BCD	ச 0B9A	சா 0B9A; 0BBE	சி 0B9A; 0BBF	சீ 0B9A; 0BC0	சு 0B9A; 0BC1	சூ 0B9A; 0BC2	செ 0B9A; 0BC6	சே 0B9A; 0BC7	சை 0B9A; 0BC8	சொ 0B9A; 0BCA	சோ 0B9A; 0BCB	சௌ 0B9A; 0BCC
ஞ் 0B9E 0BCD	ஞ 0B9E	ஞா 0B9E; 0BBE	ஞி 0B9E; 0BBF	ஞீ 0B9E; 0BC0	ஞு 0B9E; 0BC1	ஞூ 0B9E; 0BC2	ஞெ 0B9E; 0BC6	ஞே 0B9E; 0BC7	ஞை 0B9E; 0BC8	ஞொ 0B9E; 0BCA	ஞோ 0B9E; 0BCB	ஞௌ 0B9E; 0BCC
ட் 0B9F 0BCD	ட 0B9F	டா 0B9F; 0BBE	டி 0B9F; 0BBF	டீ 0B9F; 0BC0	டு 0B9F; 0BC1	டூ 0B9F; 0BC2	டெ 0B9F; 0BC6	டே 0B9F; 0BC7	டை 0B9F; 0BC8	டொ 0B9F; 0BCA	டோ 0B9F; 0BCB	டௌ 0B9F; 0BCC
ண் 0BA3 0BCD	ண 0BA3	ணா 0BA3; 0BBE	ணி 0BA3; 0BBF	ணீ 0BA3; 0BC0	ணு 0BA3; 0BC1	ணூ 0BA3; 0BC2	ணெ 0BA3; 0BC6	ணே 0BA3; 0BC7	ணை 0BA3; 0BC8	ணொ 0BA3; 0BCA	ணோ 0BA3; 0BCB	ணௌ 0BA3; 0BCC
த் 0BA4 0BCD	த 0BA4	தா 0BA4; 0BBE	தி 0BA4; 0BBF	தீ 0BA4; 0BC0	து 0BA4; 0BC1	தூ 0BA4; 0BC2	தெ 0BA4; 0BC6	தே 0BA4; 0BC7	தை 0BA4; 0BC8	தொ 0BA4; 0BCA	தோ 0BA4; 0BCB	தௌ 0BA4; 0BCC
ந் 0BA8 0BCD	ந 0BA8	நா 0BA8; 0BBE	நி 0BA8; 0BBF	நீ 0BA8; 0BC0	நு 0BA8; 0BC1	நூ 0BA8; 0BC2	நெ 0BA8; 0BC6	நே 0BA8; 0BC7	நை 0BA8; 0BC8	நொ 0BA8; 0BCA	நோ 0BA8; 0BCB	நௌ 0BA8; 0BCC
ப் 0BAA 0BCD	ப 0BAA	பா 0BAA; 0BBE	பி 0BAA; 0BBF	பீ 0BAA; 0BC0	பு 0BAA; 0BC1	பூ 0BAA; 0BC2	பெ 0BAA; 0BC6	பே 0BAA; 0BC7	பை 0BAA; 0BC8	பொ 0BAA; 0BCA	போ 0BAA; 0BCB	பௌ 0BAA; 0BCC
ம் 0BAE 0BCD	ம 0BAE	மா 0BAE; 0BBE	மி 0BAE; 0BBF	மீ 0BAE; 0BC0	மு 0BAE; 0BC1	மூ 0BAE; 0BC2	மெ 0BAE; 0BC6	மே 0BAE; 0BC7	மை 0BAE; 0BC8	மொ 0BAE; 0BCA	மோ 0BAE; 0BCB	மௌ 0BAE; 0BCC
ய் 0BAF 0BCD	ய 0BAF	யா 0BAF; 0BBE	யி 0BAF; 0BBF	யீ 0BAF; 0BC0	யு 0BAF; 0BC1	யூ 0BAF; 0BC2	யெ 0BAF; 0BC6	யே 0BAF; 0BC7	யை 0BAF; 0BC8	யொ 0BAF; 0BCA	யோ 0BAF; 0BCB	யௌ 0BAF; 0BCC
ர் 0BB0 0BCD	ர 0BB0	ரா 0BB0; 0BBE	ரி 0BB0; 0BBF	ரீ 0BB0; 0BC0	ரு 0BB0; 0BC1	ரூ 0BB0; 0BC2	ரெ 0BB0; 0BC6	ரே 0BB0; 0BC7	ரை 0BB0; 0BC8	ரொ 0BB0; 0BCA	ரோ 0BB0; 0BCB	ரௌ 0BB0; 0BCC
ல் 0BB2 0BCD	ல 0BB2	லா 0BB2; 0BBE	லி 0BB2; 0BBF	லீ 0BB2; 0BC0	லு 0BB2; 0BC1	லூ 0BB2; 0BC2	லெ 0BB2; 0BC6	லே 0BB2; 0BC7	லை 0BB2; 0BC8	லொ 0BB2; 0BCA	லோ 0BB2; 0BCB	லௌ 0BB2; 0BCC
வ் 0BB5 0BCD	வ 0BB5	வா 0BB5; 0BBE	வி 0BB5; 0BBF	வீ 0BB5; 0BC0	வு 0BB5; 0BC1	வூ 0BB5; 0BC2	வெ 0BB5; 0BC6	வே 0BB5; 0BC7	வை 0BB5; 0BC8	வொ 0BB5; 0BCA	வோ 0BB5; 0BCB	வௌ 0BB5; 0BCC
ழ் 0BB4 0BCD	ழ 0BB4	ழா 0BB4; 0BBE	ழி 0BB4; 0BBF	ழீ 0BB4; 0BC0	ழு 0BB4; 0BC1	ழூ 0BB4; 0BC2	ழெ 0BB4; 0BC6	ழே 0BB4; 0BC7	ழை 0BB4; 0BC8	ழொ 0BB4; 0BCA	ழோ 0BB4; 0BCB	ழௌ 0BB4; 0BCC
ள் 0BB3 0BCD	ள 0BB3	ளா 0BB3; 0BBE	ளி 0BB3; 0BBF	ளீ 0BB3; 0BC0	ளு 0BB3; 0BC1	ளூ 0BB3; 0BC2	ளெ 0BB3; 0BC6	ளே 0BB3; 0BC7	ளை 0BB3; 0BC8	ளொ 0BB3; 0BCA	ளோ 0BB3; 0BCB	ளௌ 0BB3; 0BCC
ற் 0BB1 0BCD	ற 0BB1	றா 0BB1; 0BBE	றி 0BB1; 0BBF	றீ 0BB1; 0BC0	று 0BB1; 0BC1	றூ 0BB1; 0BC2	றெ 0BB1; 0BC6	றே 0BB1; 0BC7	றை 0BB1; 0BC8	றொ 0BB1; 0BCA	றோ 0BB1; 0BCB	றௌ 0BB1; 0BCC
ன் 0BA9 0BCD	ன 0BA9	னா 0BA9; 0BBE	னி 0BA9; 0BBF	னீ 0BA9; 0BC0	னு 0BA9; 0BC1	னூ 0BA9; 0BC2	னெ 0BA9; 0BC6	னே 0BA9; 0BC7	னை 0BA9; 0BC8	னொ 0BA9; 0BCA	னோ 0BA9; 0BCB	னௌ 0BA9; 0BCC
ஶ் 0BB6 0BCD	ஶ 0BB6	ஶா 0BB6; 0BBE	ஶி 0BB6; 0BBF	ஶீ 0BB6; 0BC0	ஶு 0BB6; 0BC1	ஶூ 0BB6; 0BC2	ஶெ 0BB6; 0BC6	ஶே 0BB6; 0BC7	ஶை 0BB6; 0BC8	ஶொ 0BB6; 0BCA	ஶோ 0BB6; 0BCB	ஶௌ 0BB6; 0BCC
ஜ் 0B9C 0BCD	ஜ 0B9C	ஜா 0B9C; 0BBE	ஜி 0B9C; 0BBF	ஜீ 0B9C; 0BC0	ஜு 0B9C; 0BC1	ஜூ 0B9C; 0BC2	ஜெ 0B9C; 0BC6	ஜே 0B9C; 0BC7	ஜை 0B9C; 0BC8	ஜொ 0B9C; 0BCA	ஜோ 0B9C; 0BCB	ஜௌ 0B9C; 0BCC
ஷ் 0BB7 0BCD	ஷ 0BB7	ஷா 0BB7; 0BBE	ஷி 0BB7; 0BBF	ஷீ 0BB7; 0BC0	ஷு 0BB7; 0BC1	ஷூ 0BB7; 0BC2	ஷெ 0BB7; 0BC6	ஷே 0BB7; 0BC7	ஷை 0BB7; 0BC8	ஷொ 0BB7; 0BCA	ஷோ 0BB7; 0BCB	ஷௌ 0BB7; 0BCC
ஸ் 0BB8 0BCD	ஸ 0BB8	ஸா 0BB8; 0BBE	ஸி 0BB8; 0BBF	ஸீ 0BB8; 0BC0	ஸு 0BB8; 0BC1	ஸூ 0BB8; 0BC2	ஸெ 0BB8; 0BC6	ஸே 0BB8; 0BC7	ஸை 0BB8; 0BC8	ஸொ 0BB8; 0BCA	ஸோ 0BB8; 0BCB	ஸௌ 0BB8; 0BCC
ஹ் 0BB9 0BCD	ஹ 0BB9	ஹா 0BB9; 0BBE	ஹி 0BB9; 0BBF	ஹீ 0BB9; 0BC0	ஹு 0BB9; 0BC1	ஹூ 0BB9; 0BC2	ஹெ 0BB9; 0BC6	ஹே 0BB9; 0BC7	ஹை 0BB9; 0BC8	ஹொ 0BB9; 0BCA	ஹோ 0BB9; 0BCB	ஹௌ 0BB9; 0BCC
க்ஷ் 0B95 0BCD 0BB7 0BCD	க்ஷ; 0B95; 0BCD; 0BB7	க்ஷா 0B95; 0BCD; 0BB7; 0BBE	க்ஷி 0B95; 0BCD; 0BB7; 0BBF	க்ஷீ 0B95; 0BCD; 0BB7; 0BC0	க்ஷு 0B95; 0BCD; 0BB7; 0BC1	க்ஷூ 0B95; 0BCD; 0BB7; 0BC2	க்ஷெ 0B95; 0BCD; 0BB7; 0BC6	க்ஷே 0B95; 0BCD; 0BB7; 0BC7	க்ஷை 0B95; 0BCD; 0BB7; 0BC8	க்ஷொ 0B95; 0BCD; 0BB7; 0BCA	க்ஷோ 0B95; 0BCD; 0BB7; 0BCB	க்ஷெள; 0B95; 0BCD; 0BB7; 0BCC

== See also ==
- Simplified Tamil script
- Tamil phonology
- Tamil Keyboard
- Tamil Braille
- Tamil letters (on Tamil Wikibooks)
- Tamil numerals
- Tamil units of measurement
- Grantha script
- Vatteluttu script
- Tamil-Brahmi
- Pallava script
- Kolezhuthu
- Arwi
- Tamil bell
- Malayalam Script
- ISO 15919
