= Stav Prodromou =

Greek American businessman

- Σταύρος Ευάγγελος Προδρομου
- Born: Stavro E. Prodromou; May 30, 1944 (age 82); Jerusalem
- Education: Rutgers University; Polytechnic Institute of New York University
- Occupations: Technology executive Electrical Engineer; Entrepreneur
- Known for: Poqet PC; Speak & Spell
- Spouse: Amity Hance Prodromou
- Children: 4

Stavro Evangelo "Stav" Prodromou (Greek: Σταύρος Ευάγγελος Προδρομου) (born May 30, 1944) is a Palestinian Greek American businessman, and the founder and former chief executive officer of Poqet Computer Corporation. Prodromou has been CEO of Alien Technology, Peregrine Semiconductor, and Integrated Circuit Systems and Executive Vice President of Fairchild Semiconductor Corporation.

== Early years ==
Prodromou attended elementary school at the Lutheran Church of The Redeemer, then one year of secondary school at St. George School, both in Jerusalem. His family emigrated to the United States in 1956. He attended William L. Dickinson High School in Jersey City, New Jersey, followed by New Brunswick High School and graduated from Highland Park High School in Highland Park, New Jersey, in 1960.

== Education ==
The College of Engineering at Rutgers University in New Brunswick, New Jersey, was the institution where Prodromou earned a Bachelor of Science degree in electrical engineering in 1964. He continued his graduate studies at the Polytechnic Institute of Brooklyn (now known as Polytechnic Institute of New York University) and earned a Master of Science degree in 1967 and a Doctor of Philosophy degree in 1970, both with system science emphasis. His dissertation was titled "Necessary and Sufficient Conditions for Almost Sure Sample Stability of Linear Ito Equations."

== Career ==
=== General Electric (1964–1975) ===
Immediately following his graduation from Rutgers, Prodromou was employed by General Electric. His 11-year stint with GE began in its Missile & Space Division in Philadelphia and Valley Forge, Pennsylvania. He was selected for the Advanced Course in Engineering, a graduate program featuring rotating job assignments. The 3-year program, which was later named the Edison Engineering Development Program was more familiarly known as the ABC Course. Prodromou later was assigned increasing engineering responsibilities with the Aircraft Engine Group in Cincinnati, Information Systems Group in Phoenix, Arizona, and the Transportation Systems Division in Erie, Pennsylvania.

=== Texas Instruments (1976–1981) ===
In 1976, Prodromou joined Texas Instruments in Dallas, Texas, as head of the programmable calculator applications group. He led the development of solid-state software modules for the TI-59 and other programmable calculators. Later, in TI's Consumer Products Group in Lubbock, Texas, he was promoted to general manager for the Educational Products Division, known for its learning aids including the Little Professor, Speak & Spell, Speak & Read and Speak & Math.

=== Mattel Electronics (1981–1983) ===
Shortly after Mattel Electronics was spun out of Mattel to commercialize the Intellivision, Prodromou joined the Hawthorne, CA electronic game manufacturer as its senior vice president of worldwide operations with responsibility for research and development, software development, manufacturing and field service. During his tenure, the company developed the Intellivision II and numerous game cartridges (see List of Intellivision games).

=== Fairchild Semiconductor (1985–1987) ===
Following a 2-year consulting period, Prodromou was recruited by Don Brooks to Fairchild Semiconductor to head the Analog & Microprocessor Group headquartered in Mountain View, CA. The product portfolio included the Clipper architecture RISC microprocessor Later, the Gate Array Division was added to his oversight. In 1987, Schlumberger sold its semiconductor subsidiary to National Semiconductor.

=== Poqet Computer Corporation (1988–1991) ===
Prodromou founded Poqet Computer Corporation and recruited a small team of engineers that developed the Poqet PC. The core team included John Fairbanks, Leroy Harper, Ian H. S. Cullimore and Shinpei Ichikcawa, all of whom were later recognized with the 1989 Technical Excellence Award from PC Magazine. The company was funded in part by Fujitsu which later acquired it and merged it into its Personal Computer Division. The Poqet PC has been recognized as a notable milestone in portable computer history.

=== PADSystems (1992–1996) ===
Palo Alto Digital Systems, also known as PADSystems, was a design services firm founded by Prodromou and several Poqet PC alumni including Leroy Harper, which designed portable computer products for companies such as Digital Equipment Corporation, Intel Corporation, Micro Center and Zenith Data Systems.

=== Integrated Circuit Systems (1997–1998) ===
ICS, based in Valley Forge, Pennsylvania, designed and manufactured frequency timing generator (FTG) chips (also called clock chips) that are used in personal computers, laptops, peripherals and network communication products. Following his departure as CEO, Prodromou mounted an unsuccessful proxy vote to oppose a management-led buyout of ICS.

=== Peregrine Semiconductor Corporation (1999–2002) ===
Prodromou was named CEO of Peregrine Semiconductor in San Diego, California, in early 1999. The company had been founded by Dr. Ron Reedy and Dr. Mark Burgener, along with partner Rory Moore, to commercialize their proprietary SOS technology. During his tenure, Prodromou raised venture capital financing and used a portion of the funds to acquire a wafer fabrication facility in Sydney, Australia.

=== Alien Technology Corporation (2002–2007) ===
In September, 2002, Prodromou was named president and chief executive officer of Alien Technology, a firm founded by Prof. John S. "Steve" Smith of the University of California, Berkeley. During his tenure at Alien, the company ramped production of its Fluidic Self Assembly (FSA) process, secured major orders for RFID tags and readers from the DoD, Gillette and Wal-Mart. The Morgan Hill, California, company also raised venture capital financing to establish a production facility in Fargo, North Dakota, acquire Quatrotec LLC, a provider of integration services for baggage handling and screening systems, and open an RFID Solutions Center in Dayton, Ohio
Following withdrawal of Alien's IPO due to market conditions, Prodromou resigned as CEO of Alien Technology.

== Awards and recognition ==
- PC Magazine Technical Excellence Award
- World Economic Forum Technology Pioneers

== Personal life ==
Prodromou is married and is the father of four sons, including Evan Prodromou, an internet entrepreneur. For the past three decades, he has resided in the Bay Area.
