= Broadway (processor) =

32-bit CPU for the Wii

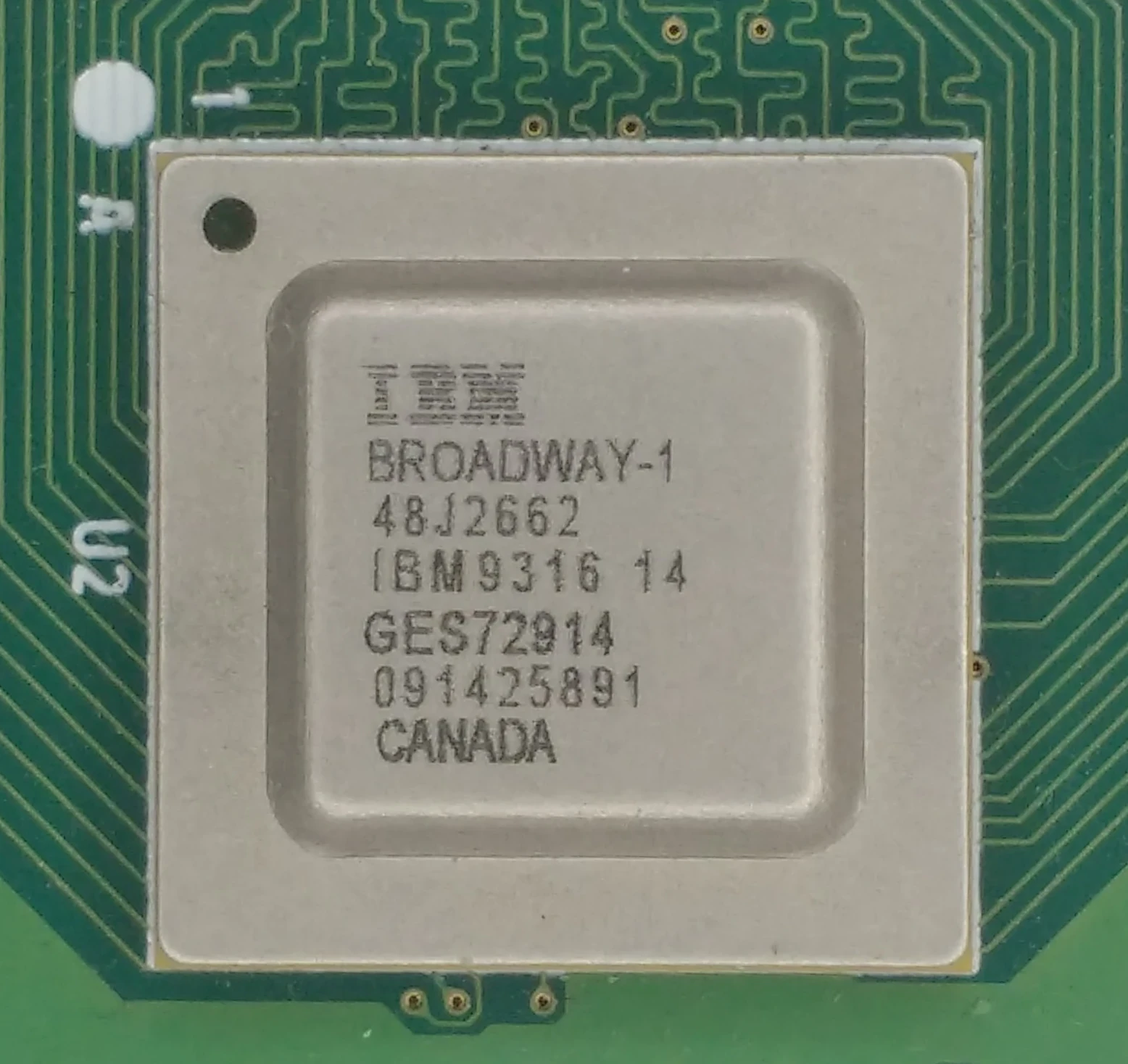
- IBM Broadway microprocessor from the inside of a Wii. The reference to Canada in the picture is related to where it was packaged i.e. by IBM Canada in Bromont.

General information
- Launched: September 6, 2006
- Discontinued: October 22, 2013
- Designed by: IBM and Nintendo
- Common manufacturer: IBM Microelectronics

Performance
- Max. CPU clock rate: 729 MHz

Physical specifications
- Cores: 1
- GPU: Hollywood

Cache
- L1 cache: 32/32 kB
- L2 cache: 256 kB

Architecture and classification
- Application: Wii
- Technology node: 90 nm (2006–2007), 65 nm (2007–2013)
- Microarchitecture: PowerPC G3
- Instruction set: PowerPC (PowerPC ISA 1.10)

Products, models, variants
- Variant: PowerPC 750CL

History
- Predecessor: Gekko
- Successor: Espresso

Broadway is the codename of the 32-bit PowerPC central processing unit (CPU) used in Nintendo's Wii home video game console. It was designed by IBM, and was initially produced using a 90 nm SOI process and later produced with a 65 nm SOI process.

According to IBM, the processor consumes 20% less power than its predecessor, the 180 nm Gekko used in the GameCube video game console.

Broadway was produced by IBM at their semiconductor development and manufacturing facility in East Fishkill, New York (now owned by GlobalFoundries). The bond, assembly, and test operation for the Broadway module was performed at the IBM facility in Bromont, Quebec. Very few official details have been released to the public by Nintendo or IBM; unofficial reports claim it is derived from the 486 MHz Gekko architecture used in the GameCube and runs 50% faster at 729 MHz.

The PowerPC 750CL, released in 2006, is a stock CPU offered by IBM; it is virtually identical to Broadway, but was provided in multiple clock speed variants (ranging from 400 MHz–1000 MHz.)

== Specifications ==
- 90 nanometer process technology, shrunk to 65 nm in 2007.
- Superscalar Out-of-order execution PowerPC core, specially modified for the Wii platform
- IBM silicon on insulator (SOI) technology
- Backward compatible with the Gekko processor
- 729 MHz
- 4 stages long two-integer arithmetic logic units (ALUs; IU1 and IU2) – 32 bit
- 7 stages long 64-bit floating-point unit (FPU; or 2 × 32-bit SIMD, often found under the denomination "paired singles")
- Branch Prediction Unit (BPU)
- Load-Store Unit (LSU)
- System Register Unit (SRU)
- Memory Management Unit (MMU)
- Branch Target Instruction Cache (BTIC)
- SIMD instructions – PowerPC 750 + roughly 50 new SIMD instructions, geared toward 3D graphics
- 64 kB L1 cache (32 kB instruction + 32 kB data)
- 256 kB L2 cache
- 2.9 GFLOPS

=== External bus ===
- 64-bit
- 243 MHz
- 1.944 gigabytes per second bandwidth

== Gallery ==
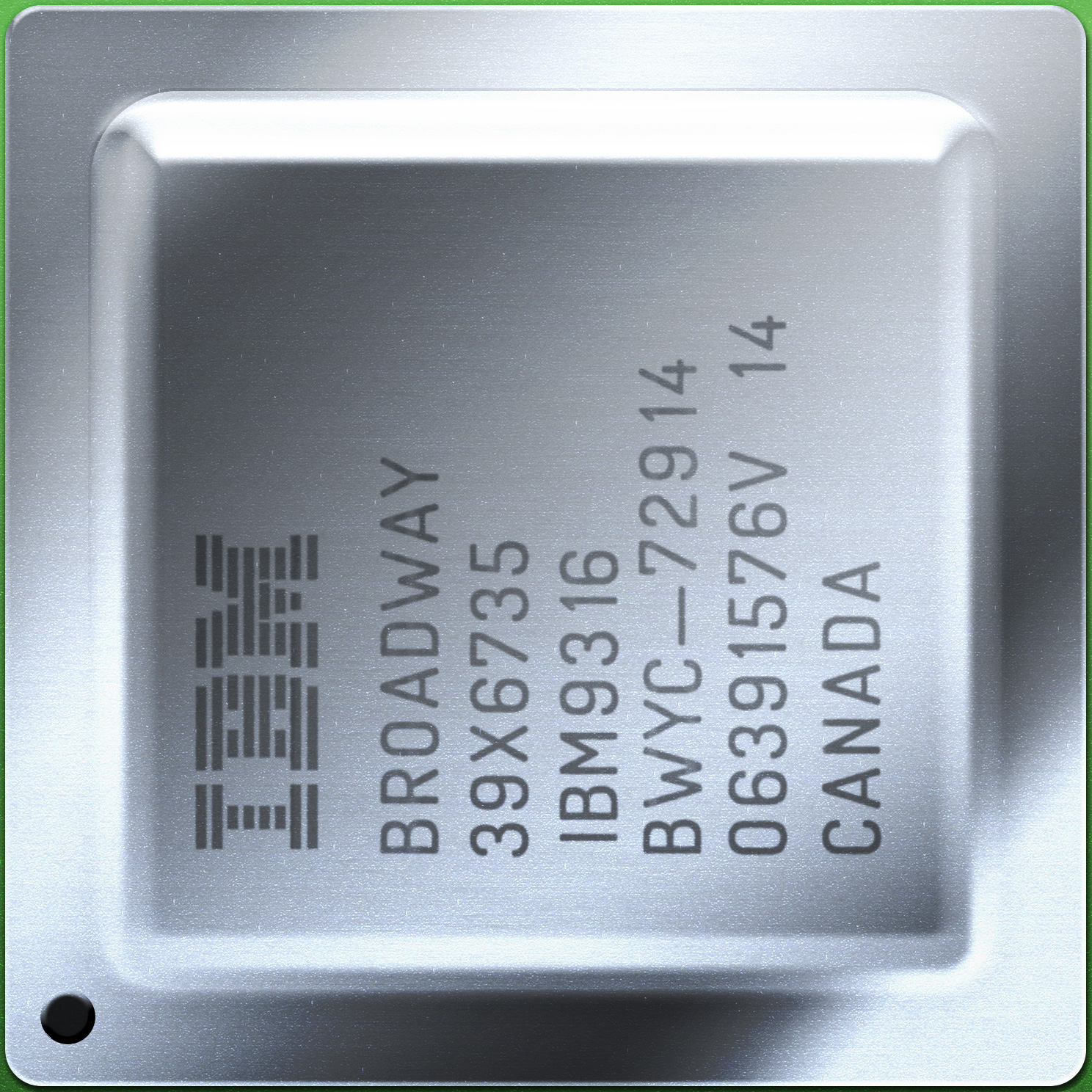
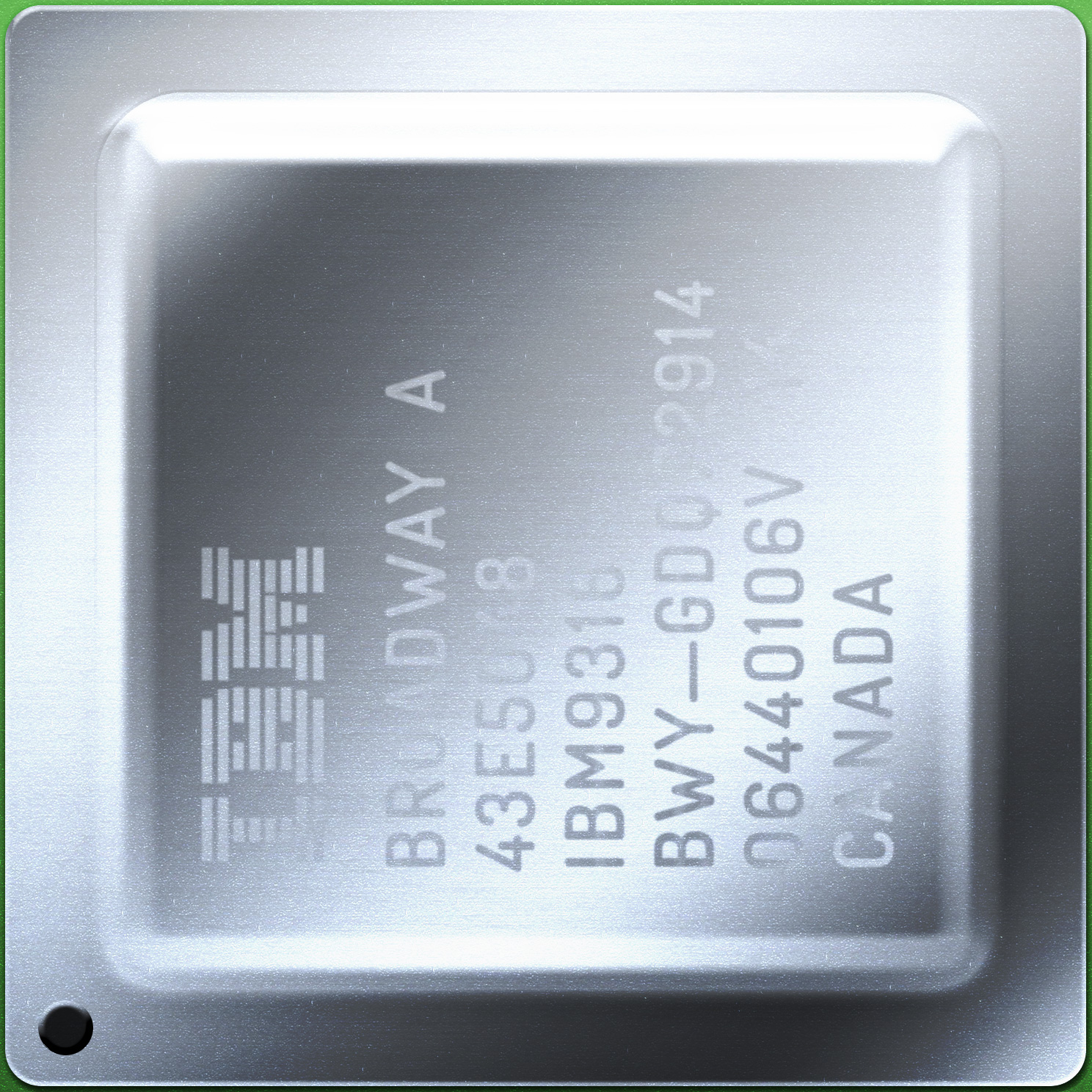
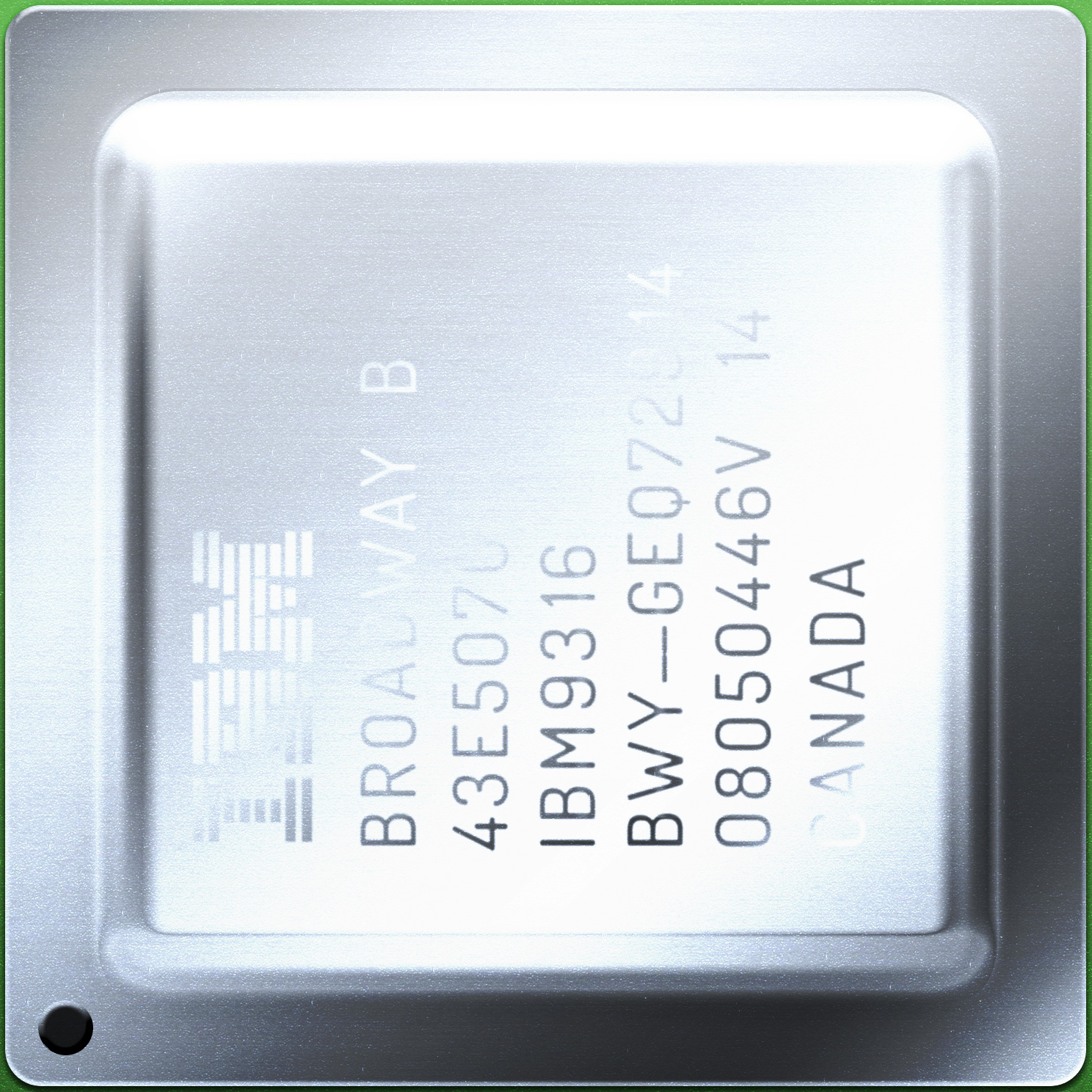
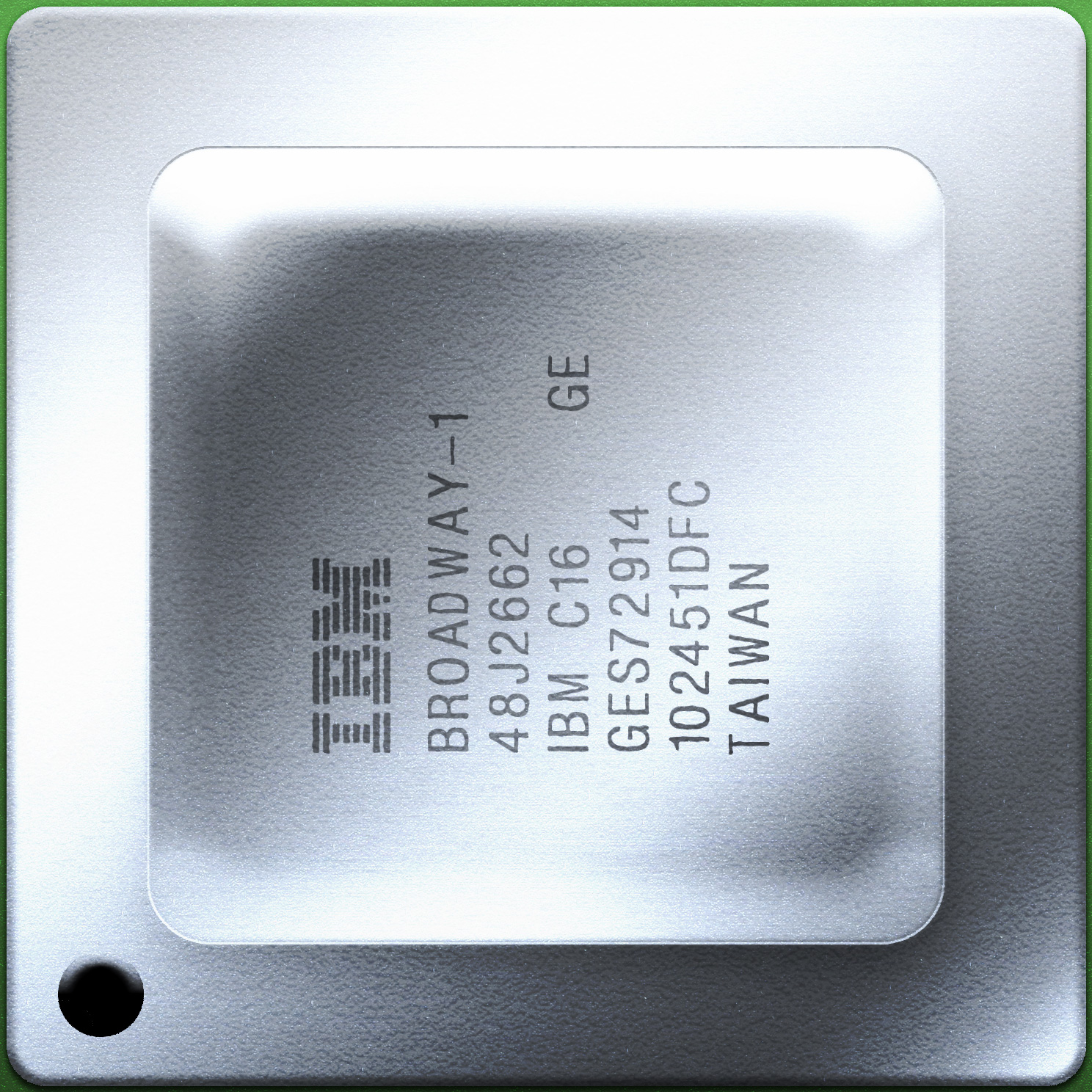

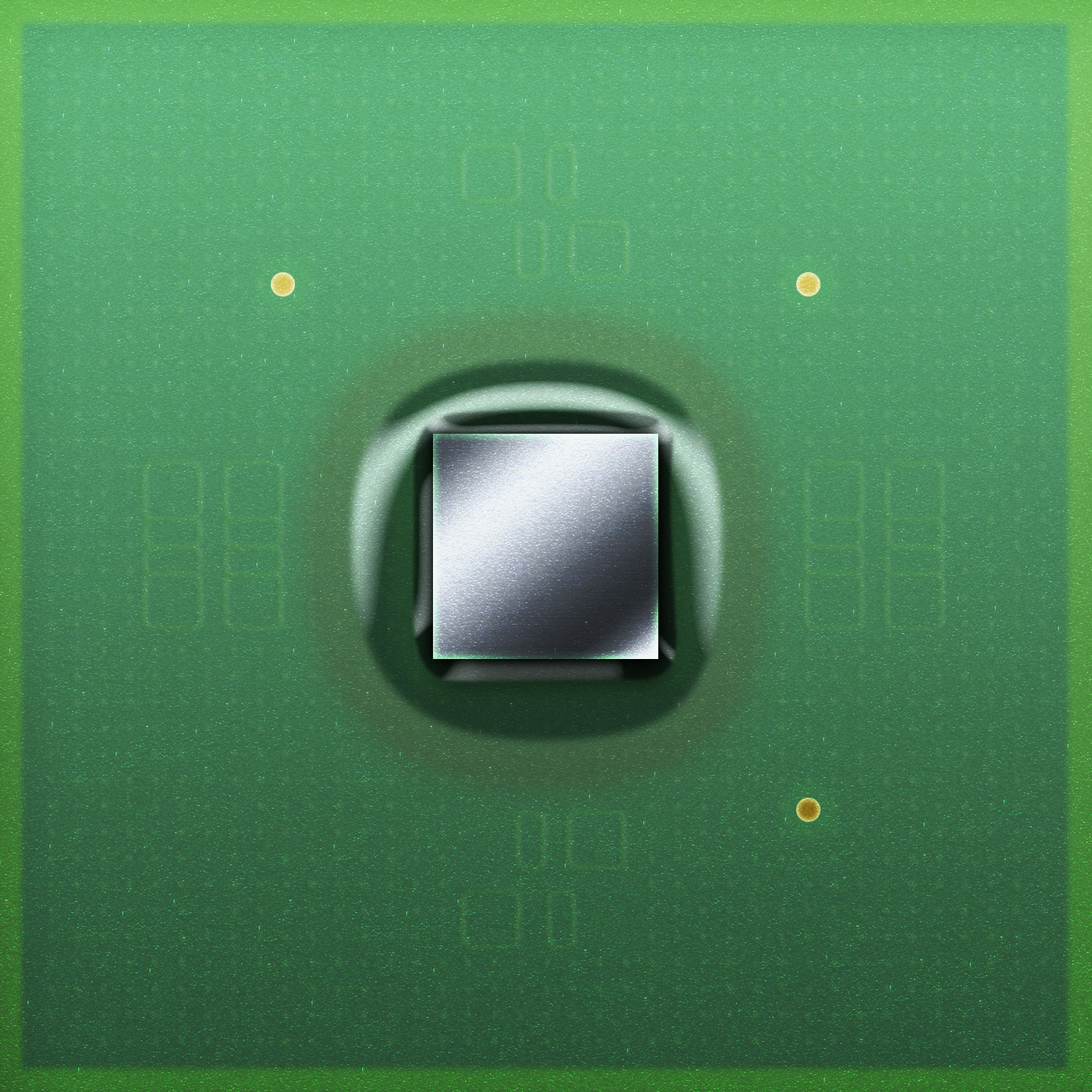
Broadway
39X6735, 2006
90 nm, 21×21 mm package

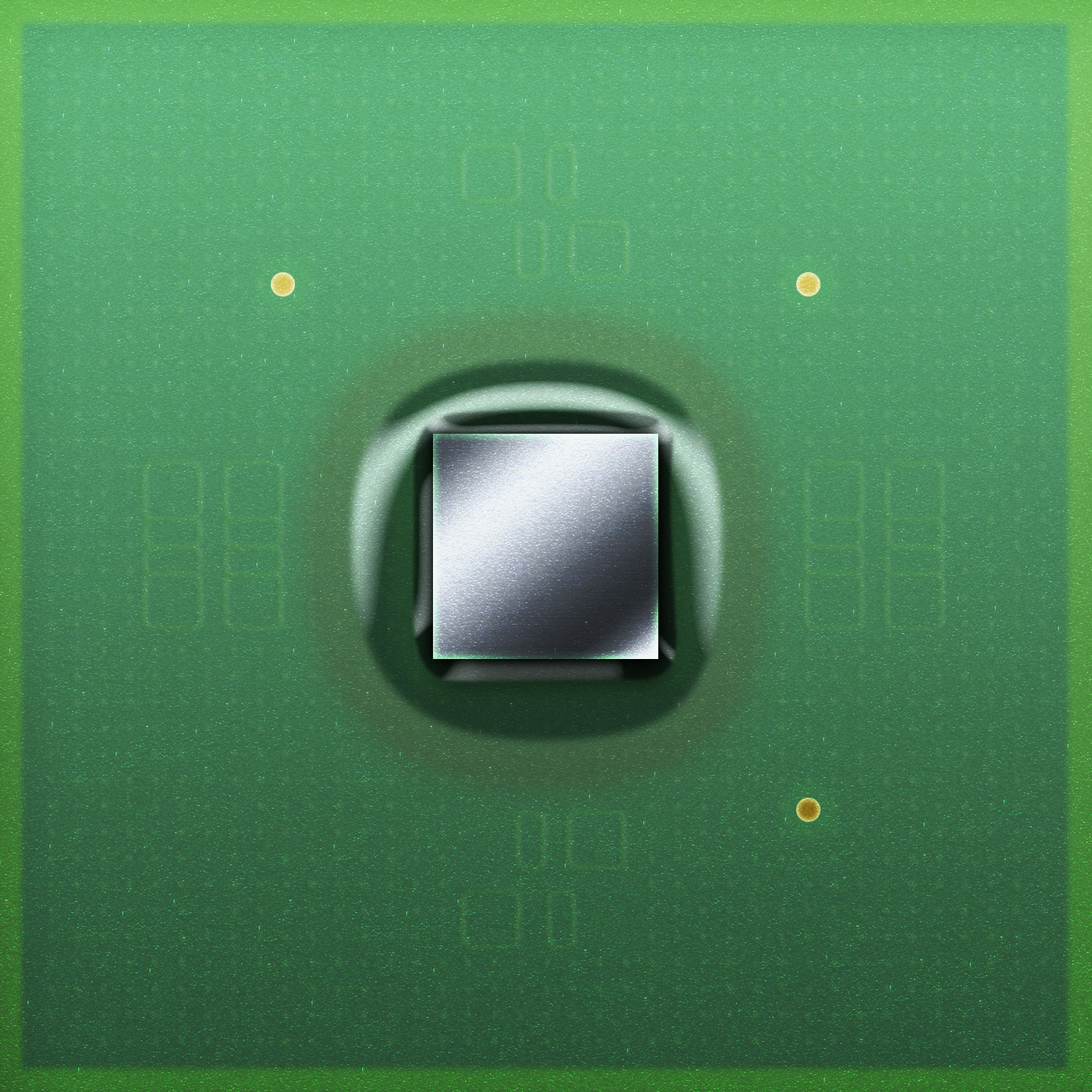
Broadway A
43E4048, 2006-2007
90 nm, 21×21 mm package

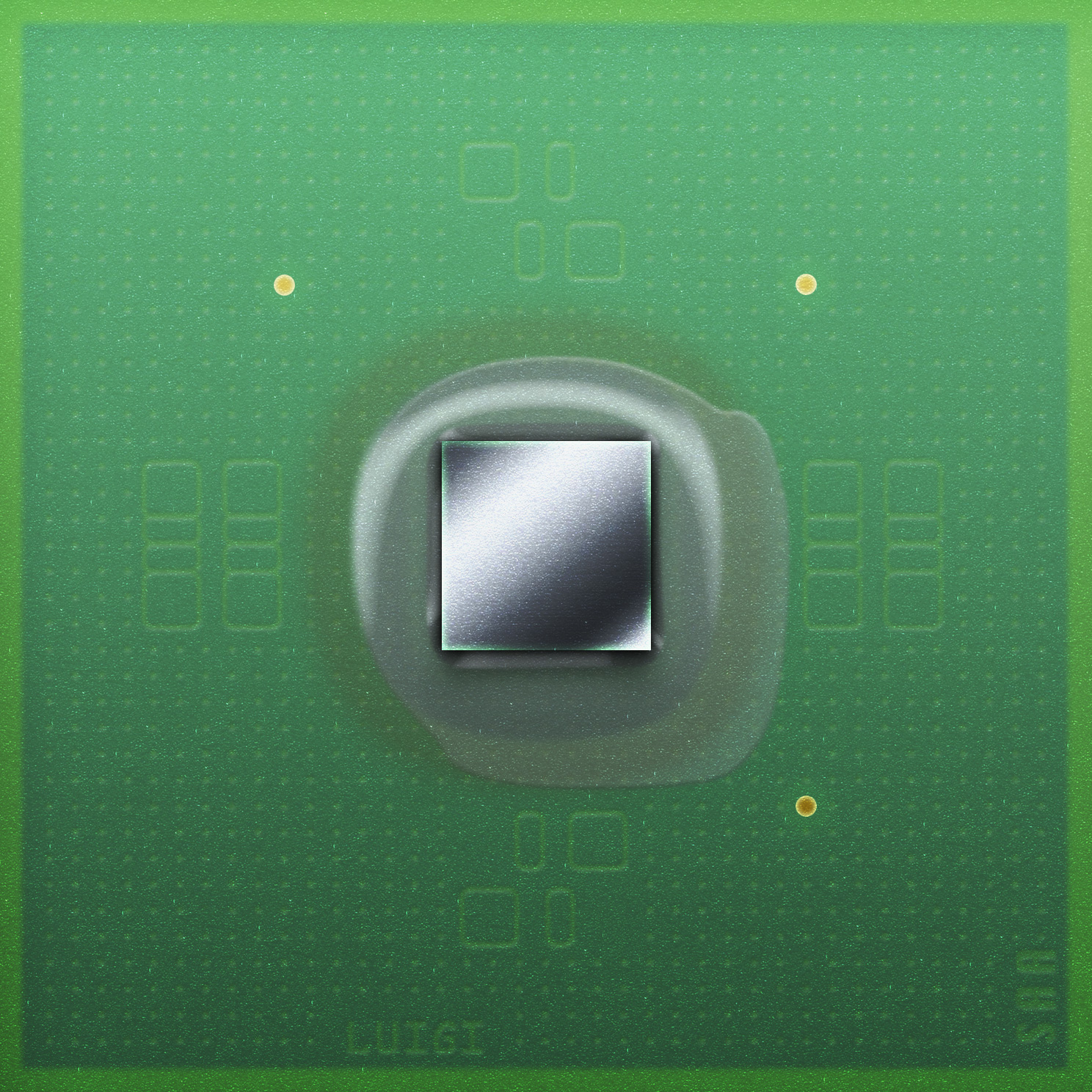
Broadway B
43E5070, 2007-2008
65 nm, 21×21 mm package

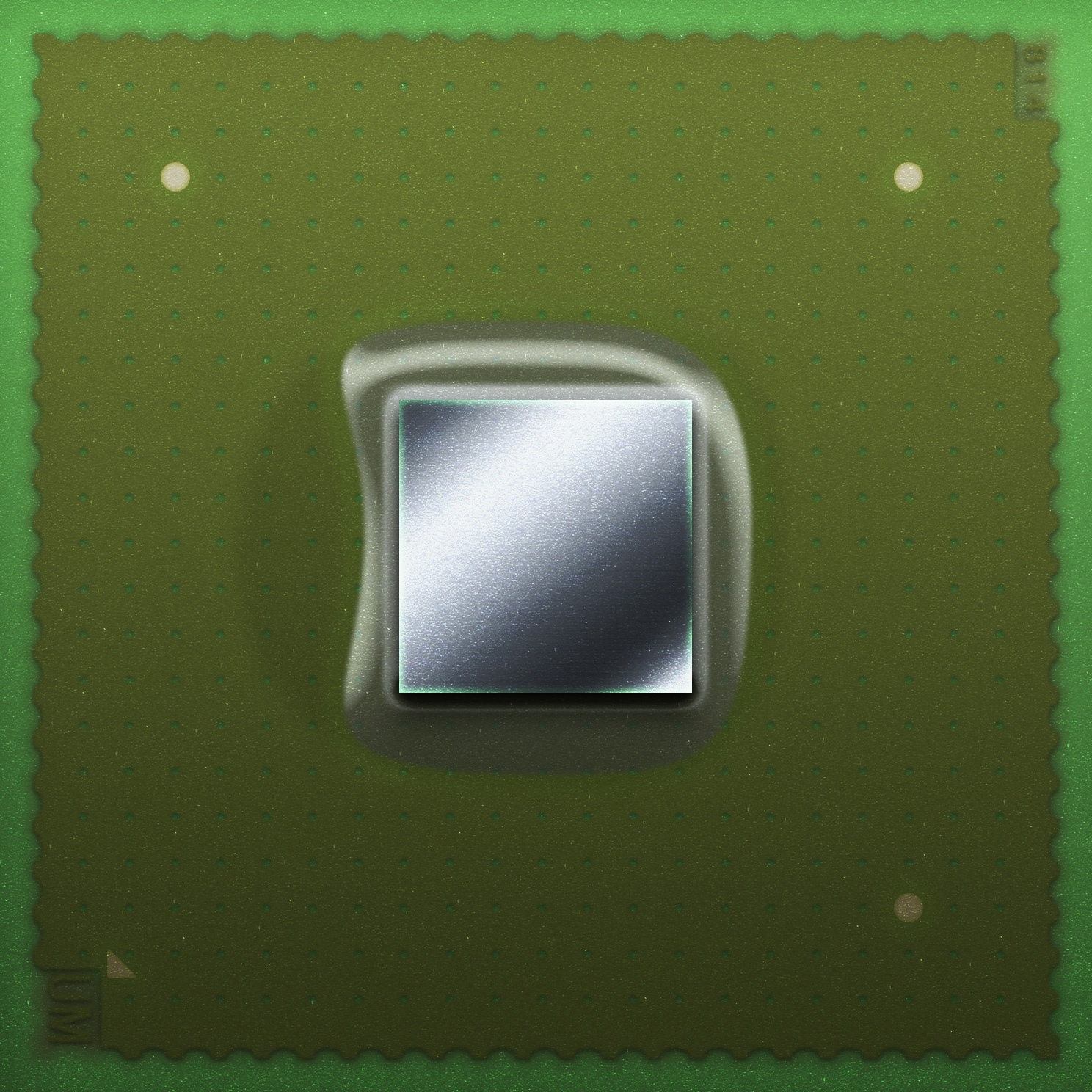
Broadway-1
48J2662, 2008-2016
65 nm, 15×15 mm package

These images are illustrations and only approximately to scale.
