= List of PowerPC-based game consoles =

There are several ways in which game consoles can be categorized. One is by its console generation, and another is by its computer architecture. Game consoles have long used specialized and customized computer hardware with the base in some standardized processor instruction set architecture. In this case, it is PowerPC and Power ISA, processor architectures initially developed in the early 1990s by the AIM alliance, i.e. Apple, IBM, and Motorola.

Even though these consoles share much in regard to instruction set architecture, game consoles are still highly specialized computers so it is not common for games to be readily portable or compatible between devices. Only Nintendo has kept a level of portability between their consoles, and even there it is not universal.

The first devices used standard processors, but later consoles used bespoke processors with special features, primarily developed by or in cooperation with IBM for the explicit purpose of being in a game console. In this regard, these computers can be considered "embedded". All three major consoles of the seventh generation were PowerPC based.

As of 2019, no PowerPC-based game consoles are currently in production. The most recent release, Nintendo's Wii U, has since been discontinued and succeeded by the Nintendo Switch (which uses a Nvidia Tegra ARM processor). The Wii Mini, the last PowerPC-based game console to remain in production, was discontinued in 2017.

== List ==
| Name | Image | Manufacturer | Generation | CPU | Clock | RAM | On the market | No. sold |
|---|---|---|---|---|---|---|---|---|
| Pippin | | Apple; Bandai; Katz Media | 5th | PowerPC 603 | 66 MHz | 6 MB | 1995–1997 | 42 thousand |
| M2 | 3DO | Panasonic | 6th | 2xPowerPC 602 | 66MHz | 8 MB | Never marketed | none |
| PlayStation 2 slim | | Sony Interactive Entertainment | 6th | | PowerPC 405 coprocessor | 36.864mhz | 32MB system 4 MB deckard | 2000–2014 | 160 million |
| GameCube | | Nintendo | 6th | Gekko | 486 MHz | 24 MB | 2001–2007 | 21.74 million |
| Xbox 360 | | Microsoft | 7th | XCPU (Xbox 360); XCGPU (Xbox 360 S and Xbox 360 E) | 3.2 GHz | 512 MB | 2005–2016 | 84 million June 2014 |
| Wii | | Nintendo | 7th | Broadway | 729 MHz | 64 MB | 2006–2017 | 101.63 million March 2016 |
| PlayStation 3 | | Sony | 7th | Cell B.E. | 3.2 GHz | 256 MB | 2006–2017 | 87 million May 2017 |
| Wii U | | Nintendo | 8th | Espresso | 1.24 GHz | 2 GB | 2012–2017 | 13.36 million September 2016 |

== See also ==
- PowerPC applications
- List of PowerPC processors
