= Peregrine Semiconductor =

American fabless semiconductor company

pSemi
- Industry: Semiconductor
- Founded: 1990
- Founders: Ron Reedy; Mark Burgener; Rory Moore
- Headquarters: San Diego, California, United States
- Key people: Go Maruyama (CEO)
- Number of employees: 605 (2019)
- Parent: Murata Manufacturing
- Website: psemi.com

pSemi (formerly Peregrine Semiconductor), is a San Diego–based manufacturer of high-performance RF (radio frequency) CMOS integrated circuits. A Murata Manufacturing company since December 2014, the company's products are used in aerospace and defense, broadband, industrial, mobile wireless device, test and measurement equipment and wireless infrastructure markets. Its UltraCMOS technology is a proprietary implementation of silicon on sapphire (SOS) and silicon on insulator (SOI) substrates that enables high levels of monolithic integration.

== History ==
The company was founded in 1990 by former NOSC (Naval Ocean Systems Center) researchers Dr. Ron Reedy and Dr. Mark Burgener, along with partner Rory Moore. Reedy served as the CEO from 1990 to 1998, followed by Stav Prodromou from 1999 to 2002. Since then, Dr. James "Jim" Cable has served as the company's CEO.

In May 2010 the company entered a joint development agreement with IBM Microelectronics for the development and manufacture of future generations of the pSemi's UltraCMOS process, with migration to 200mm wafers that facilitates the evolution of the process to advanced 180 nm, 130 nm and 90 nm nodes. According to an article by EDN executive editor Ron Wilson, with mobile operators like China Mobile and Vodafone needing handsets with 11 or 12 bands and air interfaces, "designers need high levels of front end integration".

On November 19, 2010, the company filed a preliminary prospectus S-1 registration statement in preparation for an IPO. On August 8, 2012 the company's stock began trading on the NASDAQ under the ticker symbol PSMI. The IPO raised $77 million for the company.

On August 22, 2014, Murata Electronics, a subsidiary of Murata Manufacturing, announced that it had purchased all outstanding shares of the company. The deal was completed on December 12, 2014. The company continues to market its RF solutions under the Peregrine brand, as a wholly owned subsidiary of Murata Electronics North America, Inc. Since the acquisition, Murata has invested in the company's growth and has increased its employee count by 40 percent, as of summer 2016.

In March 2017 the company acquired Arctic Sand Technologies, a designer and manufacturer of power converters based in Burlington, Massachusetts.

Peregrine Semiconductor changed its name to pSemi in January 2018. The change comes at the same time of the sale of its four billionth chip and the company's 30th anniversary of RF CMOS innovation.

On July 1, 2019, Sumit Tomar took over the position of CEO, and Go Maruyama was promoted to senior vice president of administrations. Former CEO of pSemi, Jim Cable, retired in January 2020 from his positions of chairman and chief technology officer after 20 years with the company.

pSemi opened a design center in Chennai, India, in March 2021.

In November 2021, Takaki Murata was appointed interim CEO. He occupied the position of Director of the RF Device Division of Murata, and held the position at pSemi until a permanent replacement was found. As of April 2022, Tatsuo Bizen took over the position of CEO.

== Products ==
The company has about 150 products used in applications such as cellular base stations, medical devices, public safety radios, test and measurement equipment and mobile handsets. In its handset business, the company's components are found in devices such as the Galaxy S4, Galaxy Note 3, iPhone 5S and iPad Air.

In 2014 the company announced UltraCMOS Global 1, a specialized wireless chip that combines different radio frequency functions on a single microchip and claims to let a single phone connect to more than 40 frequency bands. The company also claims that the power amplifier embedded on the Global 1 chip provides the same level of performance as the competing technology, gallium arsenide (GaAS). Global 1 will not be in volume production until late 2015 and will compete with Qualcomm's RF360 chip.

The company began a partnership with Aemulus in 2016 for the development of a new microwave frequency tester as an upgrade to the Aemulus Amoeba AMB7600.

In September 2018, pSemi launched the PE561221, the first monolithic SOI Wi-Fi front-end module.

== Locations ==
pSemi is headquartered in San Diego, California, where its manufacturing, shipping and engineering facilities are located. It also has R&D facilities and offices in the United States, Europe and Asia.

United States

- Arlington Heights, Illinois
- Austin, Texas
- Nashua, New Hampshire
- San Jose, California

Europe

- Berkshire, United Kingdom

Asia

- Shanghai, China
- Chennai, India
- Bundang-gu, South Korea
- Taipei, Taiwan

== Accomplishments ==
For their development of the silicon on sapphire technologies, founders Reedy & Burgener earned the IEEE Daniel E. Noble Award for Emerging Technology in 2011.

In October 2013 the company announced that it had shipped its two billionth chip in an order to Murata Manufacturing company.
