= Ron Reedy =

American businessman, scientist and researcher

- Born: Ronald E. Reedy; 1948; Long Island, NY
- Died: 2025 (aged 76–77)
- Education: UC San Diego; US Naval Academy
- Occupations: Technology executive Electrical Engineer; Entrepreneur
- Known for: Peregrine Semiconductor; Silicon on sapphire

Ronald Reedy was an American businessman, scientist and researcher. In the semiconductor industry, he advanced silicon on sapphire (SOS) and CMOS technology. Reedy died in 2025.

== Education ==
In 1969, Reedy graduated from the United States Naval Academy in Annapolis with a BSEE. He then earned a MSEE degree from Naval Postgraduate School in Monterey. In 1983, he received his Ph.D. in EE & Applied Physics from UC San Diego.

== Career ==
Reedy began his career at the NOSC (US Naval Ocean Systems Center) where he worked on silicon CMOS processing. In 1988, Reedy along with NOSC colleagues Mark Burgener and Graham Garcia published a research paper in IEEE Electron Device Letters that proved that SOS films thinned to 100 nm were suitable for application to high-performance down-scaled CMOS circuitry. It was with this advancement that Reedy decided to commercialize the technology. Their research findings were instrumental to the industry and have since been cited in 13 IEEE research papers and 58 patents.

In 1990, Reedy co-founded Peregrine Semiconductor to commercialize the advanced technology. Peregrine became a fabless chip designer that was publicly traded on the NASDAQ until the company was acquired by Murata in December 2014 for $471 million. Reedy served as the company's founding CEO and the company's CTO before retiring in early 2015. Reedy now holds the title of CTO emeritus of Peregrine Semiconductor.

In 2016, Reedy came out of retirement and founded Skeyeon, the first company based on placing a satellite constellation in Very Low Earth Orbit (VLEO) for the earth imaging market. There are numerous benefits to operating in VLEO that are not available in higher altitude LEO and GEO orbits, where most satellites and the International Space Station operate, including inherently higher satellite performance; substantially lower launch and operating costs; and creating self-cleaning orbits essentially solving the significant problem of space debris. Skeyeon has developed technology enabling VLEO operation for many different applications, and is actively developing its first satellites for launch.

Reedy sat on the Council of Advisors for UCSD's Jacobs School of Engineering and its Gordon Leadership Center.

Over the course of his career, Reedy has been listed as an inventor on dozens of patents. Many of those patents are related to advancements in silicon on insulator, silicon on sapphire and CMOS.

== Awards and recognition ==
In 2011, Reedy and co-founder Mark Burgener were awarded the IEEE Daniel E. Noble Award for Emerging Technologies for their contribution"to make silicon on sapphire (SOS) technology commercially feasible for wireless communications." The IEEE Noble award is presented annually to individuals who made a significant contribution to emerging technologies.

== See also ==
- Peregrine Semiconductor
- Silicon on sapphire
- Very Low Earth Orbit
