= Ernest Wu =

21st-century American engineer

Ernest Wu is an engineer with IBM Microelectronics- Avent, Inc. in Burlington, Vermont. He was named a Fellow of the Institute of Electrical and Electronics Engineers (IEEE) in 2016 for his contributions to gate oxide reliability of CMOS devices.
