= Defence Science & Technology Organisation =

Pakistani multi-disciplinary, research and development agency

- تنظیم برائے دفاعی سائنس و ٹیکنالوجی

Agency overview
- Formed: 1963
- Headquarters: Chaklala, Punjab, Pakistan
- Agency executives: Maj-Gen. Malik Shehzad, Director-General
- Website: Senate Committee

The Defence Science & Technology Organisation (Urdu: تنظیم برائے دفاعی سائنس و ٹیکنالوجی) is a multi-disciplinary, research and development agency under the Ministry of Defence, dedicated for evaluation of science and technology for use by the military.

Created in 1963 in the Ministry of Defence, DESTO's clandestine work included reverse engineering of the foreign technology and to avoid technological surprise from India. A limited amount knowledge of DESTO's project is available and much of its work is kept under secrecy.

Among its various responsibilities, it is Pakistan's national centre of expertise in chemical and biological defence.

== History ==
In 1963, the Ministry of Defence (MoD) established the Defence Science & Technology Organisation (DESTO) after accepting the recommendations adopted from the National Science Commission. The DESTO was established in a view of avoiding any technological surprise from India. Since its foundation, scientists at DESTO reportedly started studying the Wind tunnel and the applications of the fluid dynamics; its contribution in the field of research and development is significant. During this time, DESTO began its secret programme on developing the rocket propelled 120-mm caliber high explosive mortar ammunition, variable time fuze, and free flight rockets.

Its further programmes included the evaluation and reverse engineering of the foreign technology for the use of by the military. DESTO conducts research and development on weapon systems, military technologies, and renders technical advice on weapons–related technological issues to the government. DESTO retains its expertise on variety of disciplines such as aerodynamics, propulsion, electronics, computer systems, engineering, explosives, metallurgy, chemical and biological defence. Since 2001, DESTO's multi-disciplinary infrastructure base is now available to public sector industry under commercial arrangements. Projects and research work at DESTO remains under strict secrecy and very few details of the projects are known to the public.

== Involvement in strategic deterrence ==
By the early 1970s, DESTO maintained its classified projects towards the Wind tunnels and successfully reverse engineered its own version of the wind tunnel in 1974 roughly based on Dutch firm, the Stork-Werkspoor. Following the surprise nuclear test, Smiling Buddha, by India in 1974, PAEC chair Munir Ahmad Khan and Abdus Salam chaired a meeting with the officials of DESTO over the technological surprise of India. Zaman Sheikh—a chemical engineer from DESTO—was tasked to developed chemical explosive lenses, tampers, and triggering mechanized system, necessary in the technology of the fission weapon together with Hafeez Qureshi—a mechanical engineer. The codename for this project was Wah Group Scientists (WGS), and the work was done in the Metallurgical Laboratory at the Wah Cantonment in 1978. Later, it was renamed as Directorate for Technical Development (DTD), and was charged with the design testings of the weapons. After Pakistan conducted nuclear tests—codename: Chagai-I and Chagai-II—in May 1998, the United States Government identified and sanctioned DESTO for involvement in Pakistan's nuclear and missile programmes. The exact details of the work and contribution to missile systems remains under strict secrecy.

However, after Pakistan's heavy contribution on the war on terror, the American government uplifted the sanctions on DESTO.

== See also ==
- Pakistan Armed Forces
- Pakistan Ordnance Factories
- National Engineering and Scientific Commission
