= Defence Science and Technology Organisation =

Defence Science and Technology Organisation may refer to:

- Defence Science & Technology Organisation, an agency under the Pakistani Ministry of Defence
- Defence Science and Technology Group, a part of the Australian Department of Defence (formerly known as Defence Science and Technology Organisation (DSTO))
