= Intel TeraHertz =

Intel TeraHertz was Intel's new design for transistors. It uses new materials such as zirconium dioxide which is a superior insulator reducing current leakages. Using zirconium dioxide instead of silicon dioxide, this transistor can reduce the current leakage, and thus reduces power consumption while still working at higher speed and using lower voltages.

One element of this structure is a "depleted substrate transistor," which is a type of CMOS device where the transistor is built in an ultra-thin layer of silicon on top of an embedded layer of insulation. This ultra-thin silicon layer is fully depleted to maximize drive current when the transistor is turned on, allowing the transistor to switch on and off faster.

In contrast, when the transistor is turned off, unwanted current leakage is minimized by the thin insulating layer. This allows the depleted substrate transistor to have 100 times less leakage than traditional silicon-on-insulator schemes. Another innovation of Intel's depleted substrate transistor is the use of low resistance contacts on top of the silicon layer. The transistor can therefore be very small, very fast and consume less power.

Another important element is the development of a new material that replaces silicon dioxide on the wafer. All transistors have a "gate-dielectric," a material that separates a transistor's "gate" from its active region (the gate controls the on-off state of the transistor).

According to Intel, the new design could use only 0.6 volts. Intel TeraHertz was unveiled in 2001. As of 2024, it is not used in processors.

== See also ==
- Silicon on insulator
