= Multi-disciplinary engineering =

Multi-disciplinary engineering (MDE) is an approach to engineering that integrates knowledge, principles, and methodologies from multiple distinct fields to address complex problems. This approach is particularly valuable in modern technological and infrastructural developments, where challenges often require the convergence of expertise from diverse domains.
