= Silicon on sapphire =

Semiconductor manufacturing process

Silicon on sapphire (SOS) is a hetero-epitaxial process for metal–oxide–semiconductor (MOS) integrated circuit (IC) manufacturing that consists of a thin layer (typically thinner than 0.6 μm) of silicon grown on a sapphire (Al_{2}O_{3}) wafer. SOS is part of the silicon-on-insulator (SOI) family of CMOS (complementary MOS) technologies.

Typically, high-purity artificially grown sapphire crystals are used. The silicon is usually deposited by the decomposition of silane gas (SiH_{4}) on heated sapphire substrates. The advantage of sapphire is that it is an excellent electrical insulator, preventing stray currents caused by radiation from spreading to nearby circuit elements. SOS faced early challenges in commercial manufacturing because of difficulties in fabricating the very small transistors used in modern high-density applications. This is because the SOS process results in the formation of dislocations, twinning and stacking faults from crystal lattice disparities between the sapphire and silicon. Additionally, there is some aluminum, a p-type dopant, contamination from the substrate in the silicon closest to the interface.

== History ==
In 1963, Harold M. Manasevit was the first to document epitaxial growth of silicon on sapphire while working at the Autonetics division of North American Aviation (now Boeing). In 1964, he published his findings with colleague William Simpson in the Journal of Applied Physics. In 1965, C.W. Mueller and P.H. Robinson fabricated a MOSFET (metal–oxide–semiconductor field-effect transistor) using the silicon-on-sapphire process at RCA Laboratories.

SOS was first used in aerospace and military applications because of its inherent resistance to radiation. More recently, patented advancements in SOS processing and design have been made by Peregrine Semiconductor, allowing SOS to be commercialized in high-volume for high-performance radio-frequency (RF) applications.

== Circuits and systems ==
A silicon on sapphire microchip designed by e-Lab

The advantages of the SOS technology allow research groups to fabricate a variety of SOS circuits and systems that benefit from the technology and advance the state-of-the-art in:

- analog-to-digital converters (a nano-Watts prototype was produced by Yale e-Lab)
- monolithic digital isolation buffers
- SOS-CMOS image sensor arrays (one of the first standard CMOS image sensor arrays capable of transducing light simultaneously from both sides of the die was produced by Yale e-Lab)
- patch-clamp amplifiers
- energy harvesting devices
- three-dimensional (3D) integration with no galvanic connections
- charge pumps
- temperature sensors
- early microprocessors, such as the RCA 1802

== Applications ==
Silicon on sapphire pressure transducer, pressure transmitter and temperature sensor diaphragms have been manufactured using a patented process by Armen Sahagen since 1985. Outstanding performance in high temperature environments helped propel this technology forward. This SOS technology has been licensed throughout the world. ESI Technology Ltd. in the UK have developed a wide range of pressure transducers and pressure transmitters that benefit from the outstanding features of silicon on sapphire.

Peregrine Semiconductor has used SOS technology to develop RF integrated circuits (RFICs) including RF switches, digital step attenuators (DSAs), phase locked-loop (PLL) frequency synthesizers, prescalers, mixers/upconverters, and variable-gain amplifiers. These RFICs are designed for commercial RF applications such as mobile handsets and cellular infrastructure, broadband consumer and DTV, test and measurement, and industrial public safety, as well as rad-hard aerospace and defense markets.

Hewlett-Packard used SOS in some of their CPU designs, particularly in the HP 3000 line of computers.

Silicon on sapphire chips produced in the 1970s proved superior in performance to their all silicon counterparts, but this came at the cost of lower yields of just 9%.

== Substrate analysis: SOS structure ==
The application of epitaxial growth of silicon on sapphire substrates for fabricating MOS devices involves a silicon purification process that mitigates crystal defects which result from a mismatch between sapphire and silicon lattices. For example, Peregrine Semiconductor's SP4T switch is formed on an SOS substrate where the final thickness of silicon is approximately 95 nm. Silicon is recessed in regions outside the polysilicon gate stack by poly oxidation and further recessed by the sidewall spacer formation process to a thickness of approximately 78 nm.

== See also ==
- Silicon on insulator
- Radiation hardening
