= Alien Technology =

US manufacturing company

- Company type: Private, venture-funded
- Industry: Electronics manufacturing
- Founded: 1994
- Headquarters: San Jose, California, United States
- Products: UHF RFID devices
- Number of employees: 235 (August 2010)
- Website: www.alientechnology.com

Alien Technology, founded in 1994, is a manufacturer of RFID technology. The company is headquartered in San Jose, California, having the Alien RFID Solutions Center, in the Dayton, Ohio area, and sales offices in the United States, Europe and Asia. As of August 2010, Alien employs approximately 235 people. Alien produces (EPC) Class 1 and Class 1 Gen 2 RFID inlays, tags, and readers designed for use in manufacturing lines, warehouses, distribution centers, and retail stores.

== History ==
The company was founded in 1994 by John Stephen Smith.

== Products ==
Due to potential applications in a wide variety of mass-produced electronic devices, the company received funding and technical support from a number of other manufacturers, such as DuPont Displays and Philips Components. The company has established relationships with the United States Department of Defense, The Gillette Company, Hewlett-Packard, IBM, Microsoft, Zebra Technologies, and Paxar.

Products from Alien Technology include handheld RFID readers, RFID antennas, and RFID accessories.
