= IBM Microelectronics =

Defunct semiconductor division of IBM

IBM Microelectronics Division
- Company type: Subsidiary
- Industry: Semiconductor
- Founded: 1966; 59 years ago
- Defunct: 2015; 10 years ago
- Fate: Divestiture; remaining plants sold to GlobalFoundries (excluding Quebec)
- Headquarters: Essex Junction, Vermont; East Fishkill, New York (Hudson Valley Research Park); North Carolina; Minnesota; Colorado; Quebec
- Parent: International Business Machines Corporation (IBM)
- Website: chips.ibm.com at the Wayback Machine (archived December 22, 1996)

IBM Microelectronics Division was the semiconductor arm of International Business Machines Corporation (IBM) from 1966 to 2015. Two facilities in Essex Junction, Vermont, and East Fishkill, New York, housed the majority of the division. It was sold to GlobalFoundries in 2015; as part of the agreement, IBM gave its Essex Junction and East Fishkill factories and $1.5 billion in cash to GlobalFoundries in exchange for the latter supplying high-technology chips to IBM for a decade.

== History ==
IBM Microelectronics took root from the opening of two separate facilities for microelectronics: a Essex Junction, Vermont, facility in 1957, and the Hudson Valley Research Park facility in 1963. The Microelectronics Division was formally organized in 1966. By 2001, its operations also comprised offices in North Carolina, Minnesota, Colorado. It also had a plant in Quebec.

The Essex Junction facility spanned 700 acres (2.8 km^{2}) and was the primary site of domestic semiconductor manufacture for IBM before 2002. In 1966, this factory produced the first mass manufactured semiconductor DRAM, based on Robert H. Dennard's patents developed for IBM in 1966. Such chips were later used in the company's System/370 Model 145 mainframe (1970), IBM's first computer built entirely from integrated circuits, abandoning the core memory of old. Employment in the Essex Junction facility peaked in the mid-1990s, with roughly 8,500 employees. Meanwhile, The Hudson Valley Research Park facility in East Fishkill, New York, spanned 464 acres (1.88 km^{2}) and was the primary site of semiconductor wafer and packaging manufacture after 2002.

In 2002, as part of a wave of major layoffs within IBM cutting 15,600 jobs by August that year, the company let go of 1,500 people in their Microelectronics facility in Essex Junction and East Fishkill. This layoff primarily affected the former, which had employed 7,000. Executives at IBM called the layoffs part of a restructuring of the Microelectronics Division, whose business was to move toward operating as a chip foundry on a contract basis, instead of mass manufacturing its own wares to sell onto the semiconductor market. A large portion of IBM's Microelectronics operations in Vermont was spun off into a new company, Endicott Interconnect Technologies (EI), in 2002. Another layoff the Vermont factory in 2003 reduced the headcount by 500, with 6,000 employees remaining.

== 2015 sale to GlobalFoundries ==
Following a year of discussion, in 2015, IBM divested its entire Microelectronics Division, now only comprising the East Fishkill and Essex Junction facilities, to GlobalFoundries—itself a spin-off of once long-time rival AMD. As part of the deal, IBM paid GlobalFoundries $1.5 billion in exchange for the latter supplying IBM with high semiconductor technology for the next decade. The Quebec plant remained unaffected by the deal, having been placed under IBM's Canadian subsidiary.

In 2019, Marvell acquired Avera Semiconductor from GlobalFoundries, that was previously part of IBM Microelectronics.

In 2021, IBM and GlobalFoundries sued each other for breach of contract, with IBM alleging that GlobalFoundries misused the $1.5 billion in unrelated ventures. IBM stated:

IBM depended on GlobalFoundries after investing heavily in a long-term mutual relationship. GlobalFoundries responded by taking IBM's money, and benefitting from IBM's knowledge, skill and assets. Though GlobalFoundries repeatedly assured IBM it would meet its commitments, GlobalFoundries instead abruptly and without any justification walked away from IBM while IBM was reliant on GlobalFoundries. GlobalFoundries has demonstrably failed to act as a reliable partner and supplier.

The lawsuit was issued among the then-current global chip shortage. A spokesperson for GlobalFoundries called the claims "meritless ... Quite frankly, this is very disappointing coming from a company we have such a long history and strong partnership with." In 2023, GlobalFoundries sued IBM again over an intellectual property dispute involving IBM's agreement with Rapidus.

In January 2025, IBM and GlobalFoundries settled the lawsuit.

== Products ==
- PowerPC
  - Cell Broadband Engine Architecture
- Solid Logic Technology
- IBM 386SLC
- IBM 486SLC
- Cyrix 5x86, a microprocessor designed by IBM Microelectronics for Cyrix
