= Raad-500 =

Short-range ballistic missile

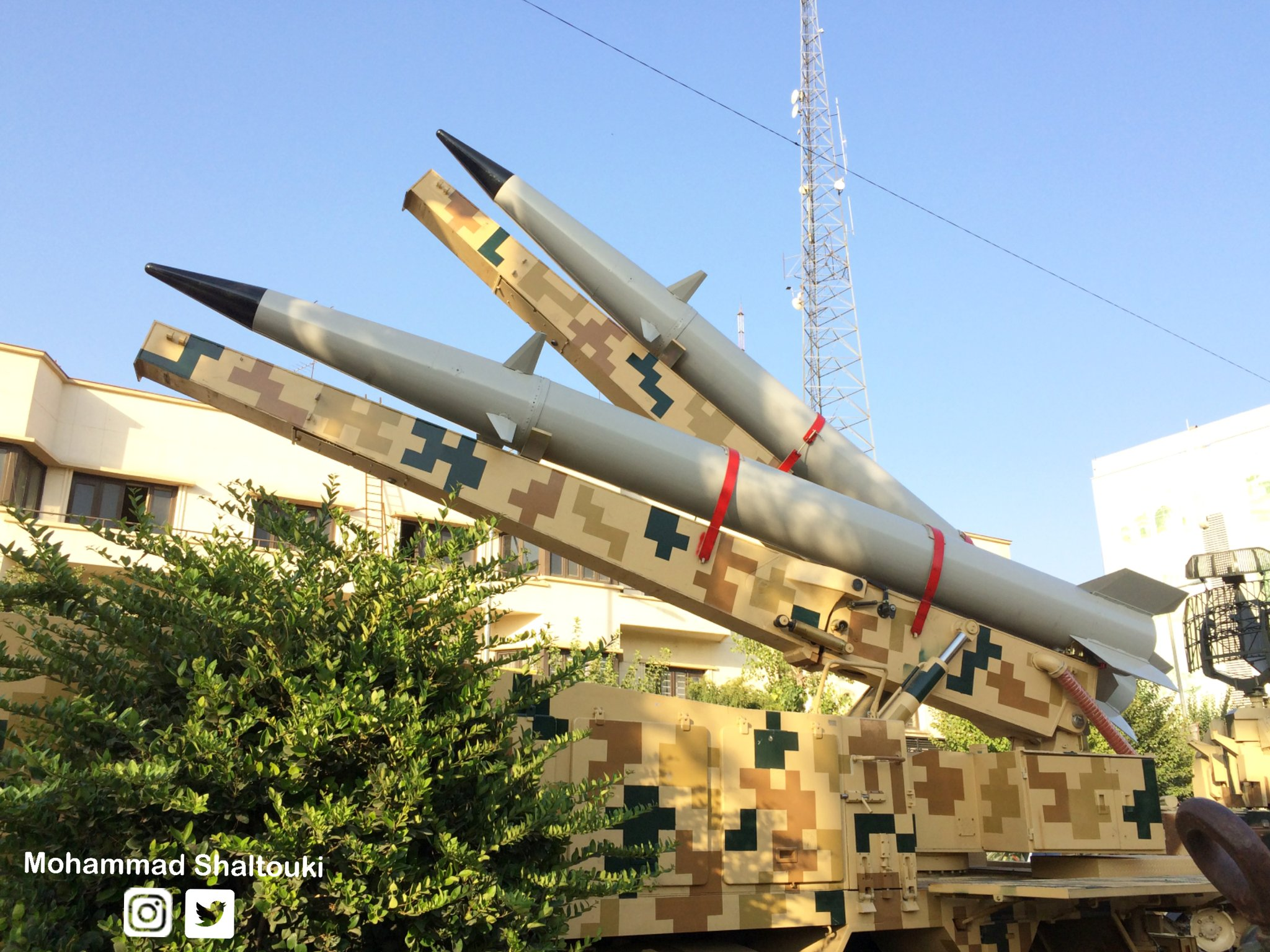
- Raad-500 missiles
- Type: SRBM
- Place of origin: Iran

Specifications
- Mass: 1750 kg
- Length: 7.61m
- Warhead weight: 200–250 kg HE warhead
- Engine: Zohair
- Operational range: 500 km
- Maximum speed: Mach 8 (terminal phase)
- Accuracy: 5 meters

Raad-500 (Persian: موشک رعد ۵۰۰) is an Iranian solid-fueled SRBM/Tactical ballistic missile. It is equipped with a progressive composite engine that is dubbed as "Zohair (Persian: زهیر)". Raad-500 means "Thunder 500", and it was designed by halving the weight of the previous Iranian missile (Fateh-110) whose body was made from metal; whereas the range of this new Iranian ballistic missile increased two hundred kilometers more than Fateh-110), and its final range is 500 kilometers.

The Raad-500, is significantly shorter than its predecessor (7.61m compared to 8.86m) yet can reportedly reach 500 km. Its warhead is smaller but still powerful, and designed to separate in the early midcourse phase, making it more difficult to detect, track, and intercept than unibody missiles like the Fateh-110, or those with warheads that separate in the terminal phase.

== Specifications ==
In 2022, Iran Watch wrote that the circular error probable (CEP) was 30m.

This ballistic missile possesses a solid rocket motor made of carbon fiber composites, it makes the motor casing able to bear pressures up to one hundred bars.

== Unveiling ==
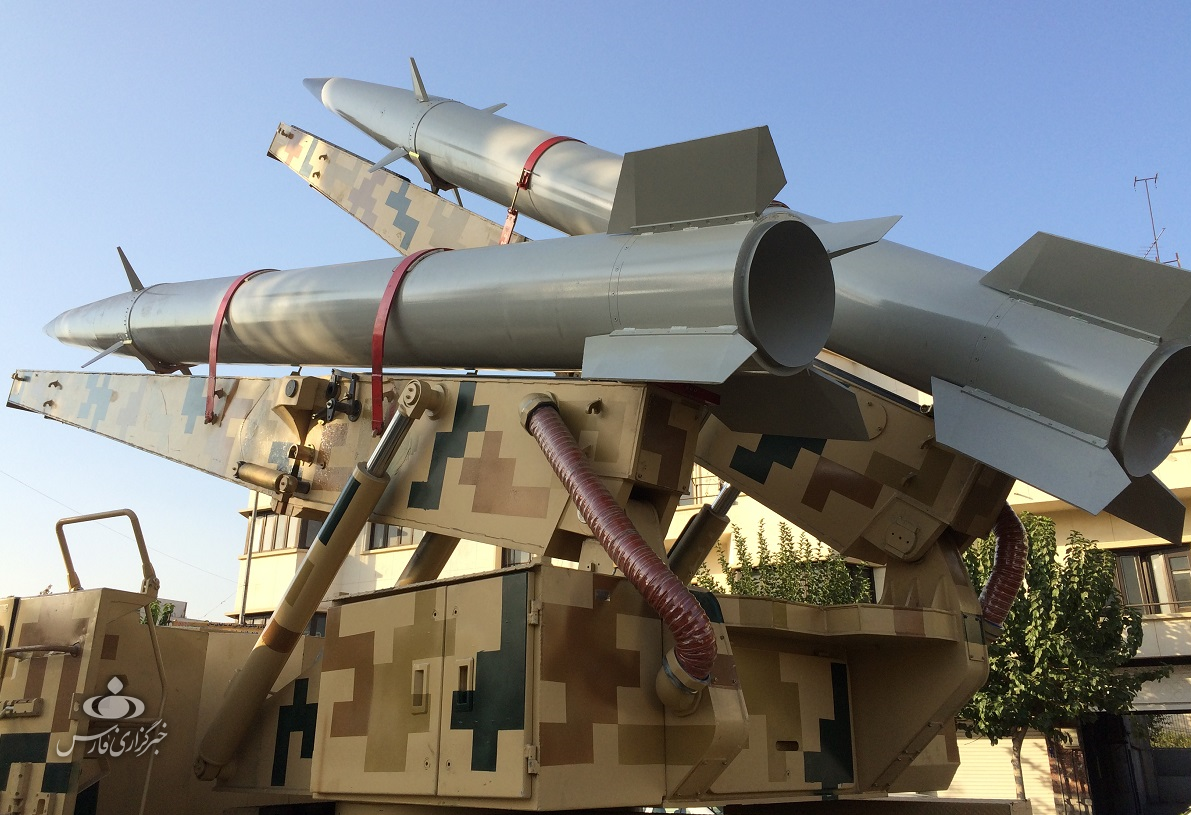
Raad-500

Raad-500 missile was unveiled on 9 February 2020 in Tehran by the attendance of IRGC's Chief Commander Major General Hossein Salami, and likewise Brigadier General Amir Ali Hajizadeh, commander of Aerospace Force of the Islamic Revolutionary Guard Corps.

Raad-500 and Zolfaghar missiles were exhibited by Iran at a military exposition in Moscow in August 2023.

== See also ==
- Ballistic missile program of Iran
- Khorramshahr (missile) – (Iran)
- Dezful (missile) – (Iran)
- Fateh-110 – (Iran)
- List of military equipment manufactured in Iran
- Iran Electronics Industries
- Science and technology in Iran
