= Majid Mousavi =

Iranian military officer

Seyyed Sardar Majid Mousavi
- مجید موسوی
- Mousavi in 2025

8th Commander of Islamic Revolutionary Guard Corps Aerospace Force
- Incumbent
- Assumed office 13 June 2025
- President: Masoud Pezeshkian
- Supreme Leader: Ali Khamenei; Mojtaba Khamenei
- Preceded by: Amir Ali Hajizadeh

Deputy Commander of Islamic Revolutionary Guard Corps Aerospace Force
- In office 4 October 2009 – 13 June 2025
- President: Mahmoud Ahmadinejad; Hassan Rouhani; Ebrahim Raisi; Mohammad Mokhber (acting); Masoud Pezeshkian
- Supreme Leader: Ali Khamenei

Personal details
- Born: 17 February 1965 (age 61) Tehran, Pahlavi Iran
- Nickname: Majid (Persian: مجيد)

Military service
- Allegiance: Iran
- Branch/service: IRGC
- Years of service: 1980s–present
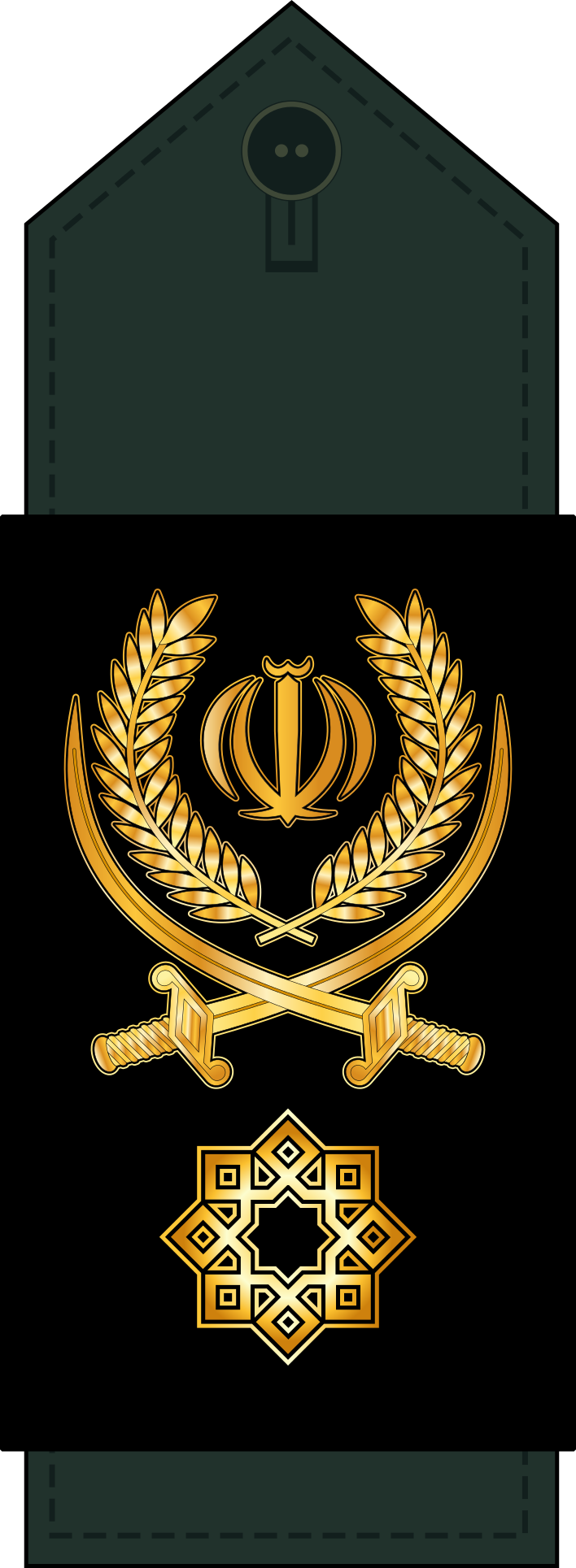
- Rank: Brigadier General
- Unit: Aerospace Force
- Battles/wars: Iran–Iraq War; Syrian civil war; Iranian intervention in the Syria; Operation Night of Power; Operation Strike of Muharram; War in Iraq (2013–2017); Iranian intervention in Iraq; Iran–PJAK conflict; Western Iran clashes; 2018 Koy Sanjaq missile strike; 2019–2021 Persian Gulf crisis; Shoot-down of an American drone; Operation Martyr Soleimani; 2024 Iran–Israel conflict; April 2024 Iranian strikes on Israel; October 2024 Iranian strikes on Israel; Twelve-Day War; 2026 Iran war

Sayyid Hossein Mousavi Eftekhari (Persian: سید حسین موسوی افتخاری, born 17 February 1965) is an Iranian military commander serving as the commander of the IRGC Aerospace Force since 13 June 2025.

== Career ==
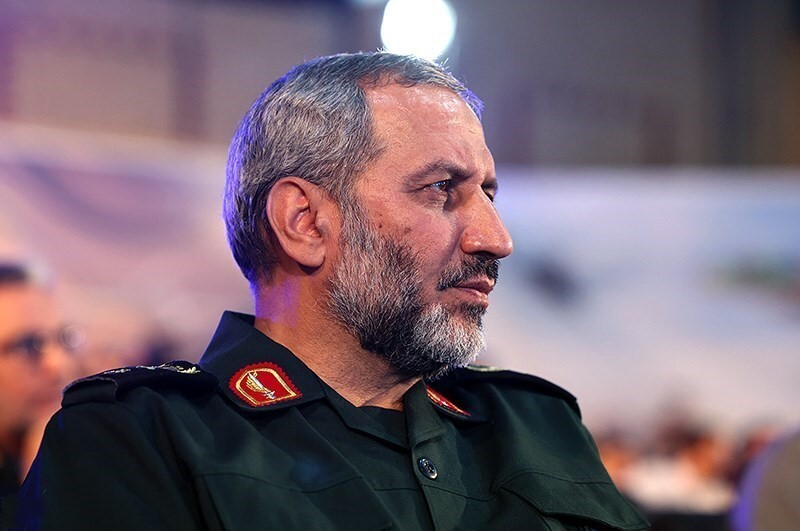
Mousavi in 2023

On 14 June 2025, Iran's Supreme Leader, Ali Khamenei, appointed Mousavi commander of the IRGC Aerospace Force, following the assassination of the previous commander, Amir Ali Hajizadeh, in an Israeli airstrike on 13 June 2025. Mousavi served as deputy commander of the IRGC Aerospace Force from 2009 until his appointment as commander.

== Sanctions ==
On 18 December 2024, the United States Department of State announced in a statement that the United States had sanctioned Mousavi, then deputy commander of the IRGC Aerospace Force, along with two Iran-based entities, for their role in supporting Iran's ballistic missile and drone programs.
