= Fateh-110 =

Iranian tactical short-range ballistic missile

Fateh 110
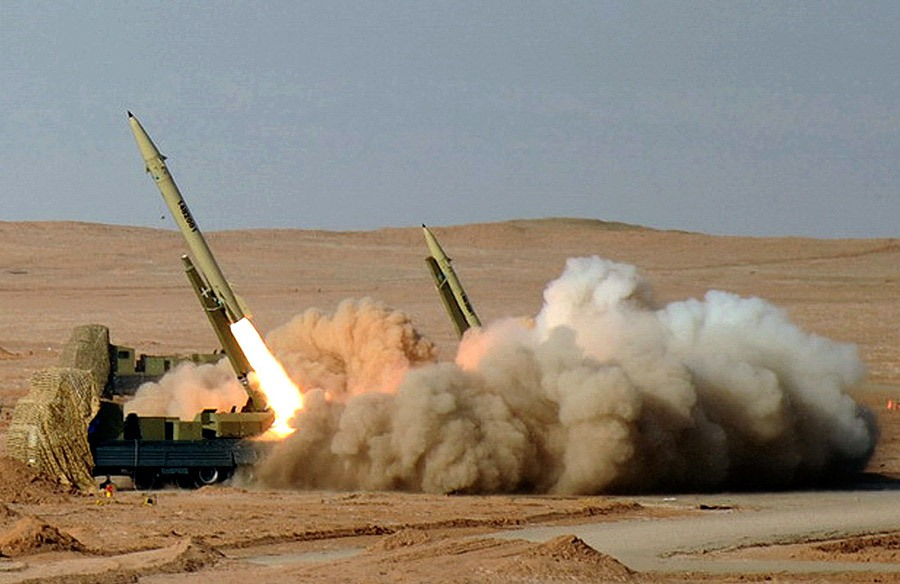
- Fateh-110s in Iran's "Great Prophet-7" military exercise, 2012
- Type: Tactical SRBM
- Place of origin: Iran

Service history
- In service: 2002–present
- Used by: See Operators
- Wars: Syrian civil war; 2026 Iran War

Production history
- Manufacturer: Iran

Specifications
- Mass: 3,500 kg
- Length: 8.90 m
- Diameter: 0.60 m
- Warhead: high explosive or submunition
- Warhead weight: 500 kg
- Engine: Single stage, solid fuel rocket
- Operational range: 300 km
- Maximum speed: Mach 4
- Guidance system: Inertial & electro-optical terminal (according to Iranian state media); GNSS (according to Western analysts)
- Launch platform: Mobile launcher

The Fateh-110 (Persian: فاتح-۱۱۰ "conqueror") is an Iranian solid-fueled surface-to-surface ballistic missile produced by Iran's Aerospace Industries Organization since 2002 as part of Iran's ballistic missile program. It is a single-stage missile, fired from a road-mobile launcher and can carry a high-explosive warhead of up to 500 kg. Four different versions, the Fateh-110A, 110B, 110D-1 and Fateh-E Mobin were developed with varying accuracy. The latest version (Fateh-E Mobin), first shown to the public in August 2018 reportedly has a range of 300 km and is reportedly more accurate than previous versions.

The Fateh-110 was reportedly developed from Iran's Zelzal-2 unguided artillery rocket. A version of the Fateh-110 is also license-built in Syria as the M-600. The missile has been used in the Syrian Civil War by Iran and Syria, as well as in the 2026 Iran war by Iran. Its presence in Syria was cited as a reason for the US transferring two Patriot missile defense systems to Turkey in 2012. The Fateh-110 was also among the ballistic missiles Iran supplied Russia with during the Russo-Ukrainian war.

== Development ==
After the Iran–Iraq War, Iran found out that it needed a more accurate short-range missile, as its Zelzal and Naze'at rockets were unguided and very inaccurate. Thus, 200 Chinese CSS-8 short-range missiles were bought in 1989, but because of their short range, relatively light warhead, and bulky structure, these missiles were not fit for use by the Iranian military, so a project was assigned to Shahid Bagheri Industries to design and produce a guided short-range missile.

Development began in 1995 and Zelzal 2 was chosen for the basis of the missile. Syria also reportedly joined the program and produced its own version called M-600. In 2006, the US Department of the Treasury accused Chinese commercial organization Great Wall Industry and its partners of playing a lead role in the development of the Fateh missile system, as Iran had no previous experience with solid fueled ballistic missiles. The first tests, which occurred in 2002, were successful, and the missile was put into production.

== Design ==
The Fateh-110 has three sets of fins. Four are at near the exhaust, four other triangular shaped fins are just above them, and four small fins are installed near the nosecone. Of the three sets of fins on the missile, only the front ones are movable.

=== Transport ===
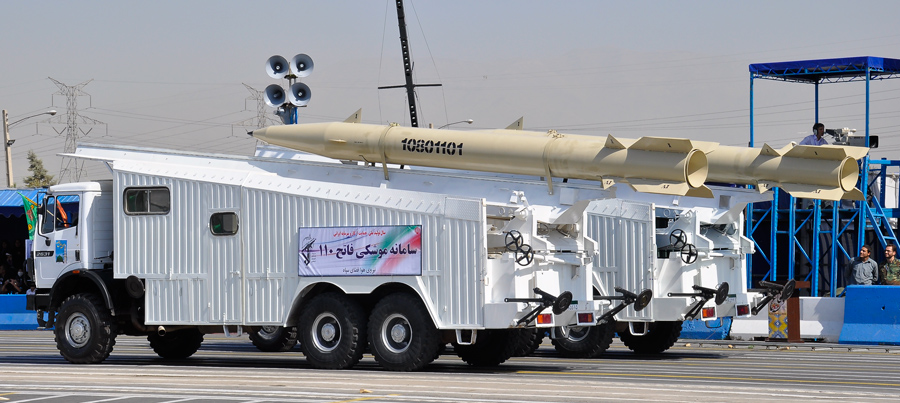
Fateh-110 on single rack TELs

The Fateh-110 is road-mobile. The second TEL is also used by newer versions of Zelzal rockets and again uses the Mercedes-Benz platform. The third one is able to carry two missiles instead of one.

== Generations ==
=== First generation ===
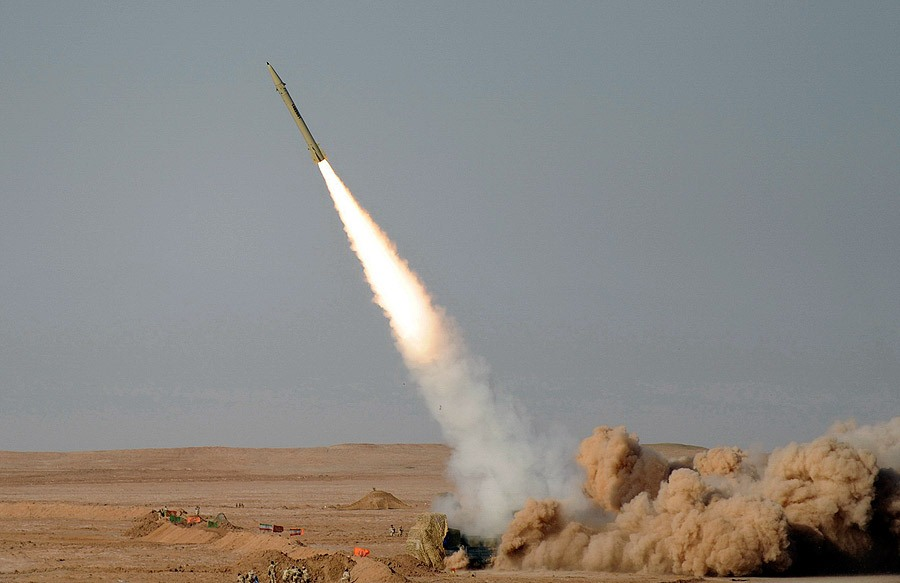
Fateh-110 in flight, 2012

The first generation of the Fateh-110 had a range of 200 km with a CEP of 600 meters. It was flight-tested in September 2002, began mass production shortly thereafter and entered service.

=== Second generation ===
In September 2004, the second generation Fateh-110B was unveiled, with the range improved to 250 km and the same accuracy of its predecessor. This version appears to be offered for export.

=== Third generation ===
In 2010, the third generation Fateh-110 was tested by Iran. Iranian defense minister Ahmad Vahidi stated that accuracy, range, reaction time, and storage capability in different parts of the country are increased. After that, Iranian TV provided footage of the test and the impact. The missile was later delivered to IRGC. The range of the missile was stated as 300 km.

=== Fourth generation ===
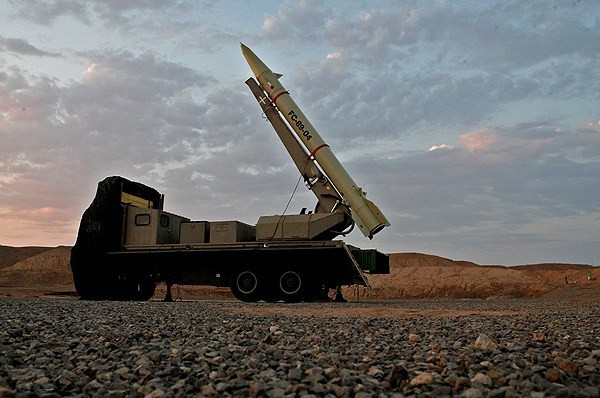
The fourth generation Fateh-110

In August 2012, Iranian state media reported a successful test-firing of its fourth generation Fateh-110. Iranian media reported that its accuracy had been improved.

== Variants ==
=== M-600 ===
A Syrian version of the system, called the M-600, or "Tishreen", is produced in Syria at the SSRC centers. In 2016, the Israeli Military Intelligence reported that Syria had resumed production of the M-600 ballistic missiles, which was halted after 2012. The Syrian M-600 is reportedly based on the second generation Fateh-110 (Fateh-110B). In May 2010, Israeli officials announced that Syria had transferred M-600 launchers and missiles to arm the Lebanese paramilitary group known as Hezbollah.

=== Anti-ship ballistic missile variants ===
In 2014, the Islamic Revolutionary Guard Corps announced two variants of the Fateh-110, which they called the Hormuz-1 and Hormuz-2. The Hormuz-1 was reportedly an anti-radiation missile, and the Hormuz-2 being an anti-ship missile. Analysis by Anthony Cordesman with the Center for Strategic and International Studies suggests that the Hormuz-2 is "essentially the same as the Hormuz-1".

In September 2020, the IRGC announced a new naval variant of the Zolfaghar missile, designated Zolfaghar Basir.

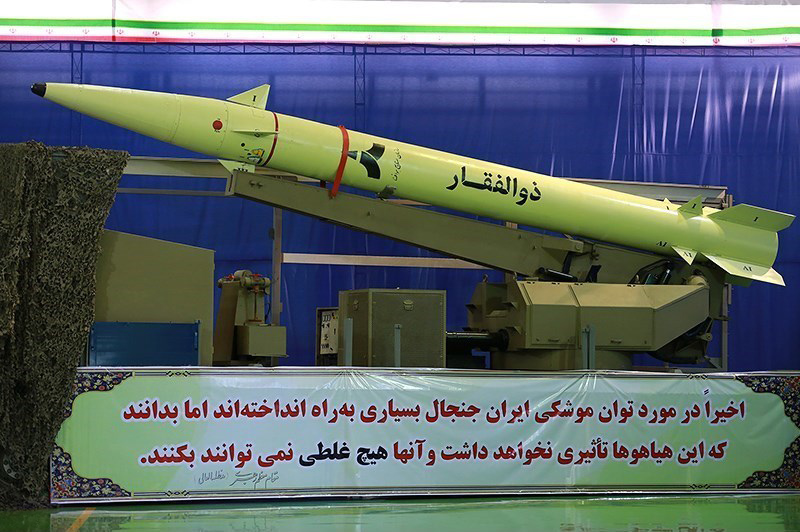
A Zolfaghar missile, 2016

=== Zolfaghar ===
The Zolfaghar is an Iranian tactical ballistic missile believed to be based on the Fateh-110 family and the first ballistic missile of any sort openly used by Iran in a foreign conflict. The missile's claimed range of 700km is considered largely true based on the 2017 Deir ez-Zor missile strike; this apparently results from replacing the metal body of the Fateh-110 with composite, saving substantial weight. However, doubts have been raised about its reliability and accuracy, and Jane's assesses that the Zolfaghar's performance is poor.

The Zolfaghar (and possibly other members of the Fateh-110 family) is believed to use commercial GNSS systems to improve accuracy.

=== Fateh Mobin ===
The Fateh Mobin is an Iranian single-stage solid propelled Terminal Infrared homing dual surface-to-surface and anti-ship short-range ballistic missile. It was first unveiled on a military parade in Tehran on 13 August 2018. It is an upgraded version of the Fateh-110 with better guidance. The Iranians plan on using its guidance systems on the Zolfaghar (missile) which some sources suggest does have a poor guidance system.

Characteristics In the words of Iranian defense minister Amir Hatami the missile is purely indigenous, low-observable and precision guided. The missile is thought to be a variant of the Fateh-110 with only a better guidance system and same range of 200–300 km. The missile probably has Terminal guidance through Imaging Infrared which explains its nose cone. A missile with such guidance itself is radar-evasive. The missile has a length of just 9 m which means that it can be loaded in sea containers to be launched from sea platforms.

== Table ==
Variant	Range (km)	Warhead weight (kg)	Speed (Mach)	Notes
Fateh-110 first generation	200	650	3.5	First variant.
Fateh-110 second generation	250	450	3.7	Announced in 2004. Also known as Fateh A-110 and Fateh-110A
Fateh-110 third generation	300	650	3	Announced in 2010. Reports say that accuracy is also increased. This variant is not named and is referred to by a variety of shorthand notations, such as "Fateh-110 block 3" or "Fateh-110 Mod 3."
Fateh-110 fourth generation	300	650	3	Addition of a new guidance system with "100% precision". Shown in 2012. Also known as "Fateh-110-D1"
Khalij Fars	300	650	3	Anti-ship ballistic missile based on Fateh-110. Unveiled in 2011.
Hormoz-1	300	450–600	4–5	Anti-ship / anti-radar (ARM) ballistic missile.
Hormoz-2	300	450–600	4–5	Anti-ship / anti-radar (ARM) ballistic missile in May- 2014.
M-600 or Tishreen	250	450	3.7	Syrian variant produced by SSRC.
Fateh-313	500	500	5	Successor to Fateh-110 versions.
Raad-500	500		8	utilizes a composite engine zohair
Zolfaghar	750	579	7.5	newest version with submunitions warhead unveiled in 2016.
Dezful	1000	579–650	7	Upgrade of older Zolfaghar missile. CEP of 5 meters

== Operational history ==
=== Iran ===
In 2017, Iran was assessed as having less than 100 launchers for all Fateh-110 variants.

Iran used the Fateh-110B against Kurdish dissidents in Iraq in 2018. In that attack, an estimated 7 Fateh-110s were used. It is believed that during the 8 January 2020 missile attack of the US military bases in Iraq, Iran used the Fateh-110 missile. Iran Watch reports that Fateh-313 missiles specifically were used.

Fateh-110 missiles are believed to have been used in attacks on "Mossad agents" in Iraqi Kurdistan on 3 March 2022 and 16 January 2024. An estimated >9 Fateh-family missiles, likely Fateh-110s, were used in the January 2024 attack.

Fateh-110 and Zolfaghar missiles are believed to undergo final assembly in the Kuh-e Barjamali site, which is part of Iran's Khojir Aerospace Complex southeast of Tehran. The site was bombed by the US on 7 March 2026.

On 30 May 2026, Bloomberg News reported, citing a person familiar with the incident that debris from a downed Fateh-110 missile fell on Ali Al Salem Air Base in Kuwait during the 2026 Iran war, slightly injuring roughly five American soldiers and contractors, destroying one US MQ-9 Reaper drone, and causing serious damage to at least one more.

=== Syria ===
On 3 and 5 May 2013, Israel said it had hit a shipment of Fateh-110 in Syria that were "destined for Hezbollah". Israel said it would not tolerate "game changing weapons" falling into the hands of Hezbollah. On 18 May Israeli media claimed that the Syrian army had aimed a battery of Tishreen missiles, Syria's version of Iran's Fateh-110, at Tel Aviv according to reconnaissance satellites. These missiles are believed to see possible use as a deterrent against further Israeli airstrikes on Syrian targets.

According to two unnamed U.S. military officials, the Syrian Army fired at least two Fateh A-110 missiles in late December 2012. The firing of these missiles appeared to be an effort to more precisely target Syrian rebels.

In late November 2014, Iranian and Lebanese sources confirmed that Hezbollah had received Iranian Fateh-110 ballistic missiles and inducted them into their missile arsenal. With a 250–350 km (160–220 mi) range, Fateh-110 missiles fired from Lebanon could hit targets anywhere in Israel up to the northern Negev. Israel has regarded deliveries of such missiles as justification for preemptive response, as the previous year it attacked missile shipments, transport convoys, and storage sites in Syria and Lebanon to prevent these and other missile types from being acquired by Hezbollah.

=== Iraq ===
On 13 March 2022, 12 Fateh-110 missiles were used in the Erbil missile strikes. On 15 January 2024, Fateh-110 missiles were reportedly launched during the Erbil attack.

=== Lebanon ===
Hezbollah reportedly fired a single Fateh-110 missile at a target in central Israel on 6 November 2024. A Fateh-110 may have been used by Hezbollah on 15 March 2026 in a strike on central Israel, but other missiles or long range rockets cannot be ruled out. One may have been used in an attack on southern Israel on 19 March 2026 as well.

== Operators ==
=== State-operators ===
- Iran
- Ba'athist Syria
- Russia – An intelligence assessment shared in October 2022 with Ukrainian and U.S. officials contended that Iran's armaments industry was preparing a first shipment of Fateh-110 and Zolfaghar missiles to Russia. According to some secret evidences, Iranian military companies in Yazd province dispatched more than 200 missiles to Russian army. The sale was confirmed by the Iranian side later in October. However, as of May 2023, Russia had not yet acquired Fateh or Zolfaghar missiles. According to Reuters, the missiles were transferred in January 2024.

=== Non-state operators ===
- Hezbollah – In 2014, the IRGC confirmed that Iran had delivered Fateh 110 missiles to Hezbollah. Israel had previously claimed that Syria was transferring M-600 missiles to the armed group.

== See also ==
- Islamic Republic of Iran Armed Forces
- Defense industry of Iran
- List of military equipment manufactured in Iran
- Islamic Revolutionary Guard Corps Aerospace Force
- Zelzal-2
- Zelzal-3
- Fateh-313
- Raad-500 (missile)
- Fajr-5
- Science and technology in Iran
- Fath-360
