= Dezful (missile) =

Type of medium range ballistic missile

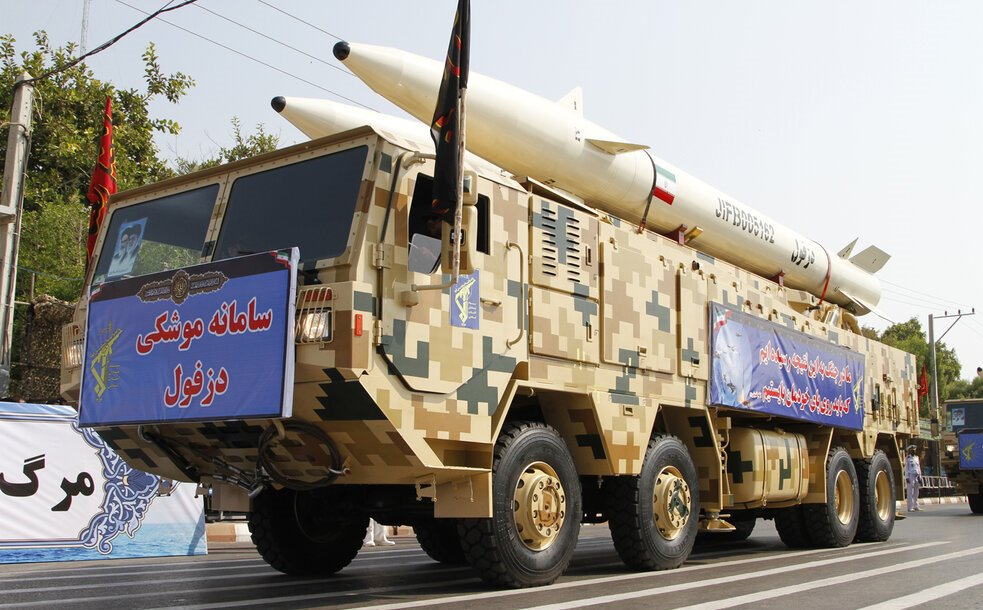
- Type: Tactical MRBM

Specifications
- Diameter: 0.68

Dezful (Persian: دزفول) is an Iranian single-stage, solid-fueled medium range ballistic missile (MRBM). It was unveiled in February 2019 in an underground missile factory. The Iranian armed forces said that the missile has a range of 1,000 kilometers (620 miles). The range has not been independently confirmed. Based on the missile's performance in Iran's Great Prophet 17 military exercise in 2021, Iran Watch estimated a CEP (circular error of probability) of 10-30 meters. The missile can attain the speed of Mach 7 (8,643 km/h). The Dezful is an upgrade of the older 700 km Zolfaghar model and is classified as part of the Fateh family of missiles. Iranian sources describe the Dezful missile as having a smaller size and weight than the Zolfaghar missile.

According to Jane's, the warhead weight was not disclosed, while Fars News reported a 450 kg warhead weight.

== See also ==
- Fateh-110
- Zolfaghar (missile)
- Haj Qasem (missile)
- List of military equipment manufactured in Iran
- Science and technology in Iran
- Raad-500 (missile)
- Khorramshahr (missile)
