= 2018 Marivan border crossing attack =

Attack by the Kurdistan Free Life Party against Iran

Marivan border crossing attack 2018
- Marivan (Iran)
- Type: border crossing attack
- Location: Marivan, Kurdistan province, Iran
- Planned by: Kurdistan Free Life Party
- Date: 21 July 2018
- Casualties: 10 soldiers of IRGC killed 8 soldiers of IRGC injured

The Marivan border crossing attack was an attack by Kurdistani forces against an Iranian border crossing. It occurred on July 21, 2018, conducted by PJAK forces. The attack took place near the village of Dari, from the city of Marivan, Kurdistan. Ten Iranian Revolutionary Guard Corps soldiers were killed and eight were wounded.

== Attack ==
On Saturday, July 21, 2018, at around 2:30 am, a squad of armed PJAK attacked the border guard station of Hamza Sayyid al-Shohada. According to the commander of the Marivan station, the attack occurred in a vulnerable part of the station, leading to the explosion of the station's ammunition dump and killing 10 IRGC soldiers and one soldier from Basij.

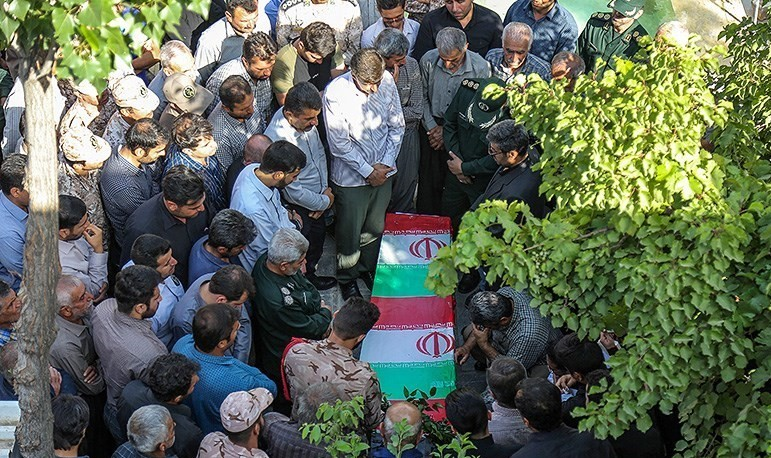
The killed soldier of IRGC in the attack

== Reaction ==
PJAK claimed responsibility for the attack.

== See also ==
- 2018 Iraqi Kurdistan missile strike
- 2017 Deir ez-Zor missile strike
