= Operation Strike of Muharram =

2018 Iranian drone strike operation against ISIS

- Part of the reactions to the Ahvaz military parade attack and the Deir ez-Zor Governorate campaign of the Syrian civil war
- Type: Missile and drone strike
- Location: Hajin, Eastern Euphrates, Syria; 34°41′22″N 40°49′51″E
- Target: Islamic State of Iraq and the Levant
- Date: 1 October 2018; 2 a.m. local time (UTC+03:30)
- Executed by: Islamic Revolutionary Guard Corps: IRGC Aerospace Force
- Location of the ISIL base hit by missiles

On 1 October 2018, under the code name Operation Strike of Muharram (Persian: ضربت محرم, romanized: Zarbat-e-Moharram), Iran's Islamic Revolutionary Guard Corps (IRGC) conducted missile and drone strikes against the Islamic State of Iraq and the Levant based east of the Euphrates river in Syria in retaliation to the Ahvaz military parade attack the previous week.

== Attacks ==
The attack was carried out on 1 October 2018 at 2 a.m. local time. It was coordinated with Syria and Russia, according to a field commander in the region. The Islamic Revolutionary Guards Corps declared that its Aerospace Force has launched multiple missiles against an Islamic State of Iraq and the Levant headquarters but did not specify the number. The Quds Force was also involved in this operation by providing intelligence.

=== Missile strikes ===
Fars News Agency reported that a total of six ballistic missiles were fired, of Zolfaghar and Qiam types. The IRGC did not reveal from where they had fired the missiles, though disclosing that they flew 570 kilometers. A video of launching missiles was aired by the state television of Iranian, with the reporter saying that the launchers were located somewhere in the Kermanshah Province. The imagery shown also suggested the missiles flew over Iraq near Tikrit. At least one missile was adorned with the slogans "death to America," "death to Israel" and "death to al Saud". An American defense official told CNN that through satellite surveillance, they were closely watching mobile missile launchers that were moved to fire the missiles that landed three miles away from U.S. military.

Mobile videos posted on social media showed one of the missiles falling on the ground shortly after launch. Houshang Bazvand, governor of Kermanshah Province, denied that a missile struck the ground.

=== Drone strikes ===
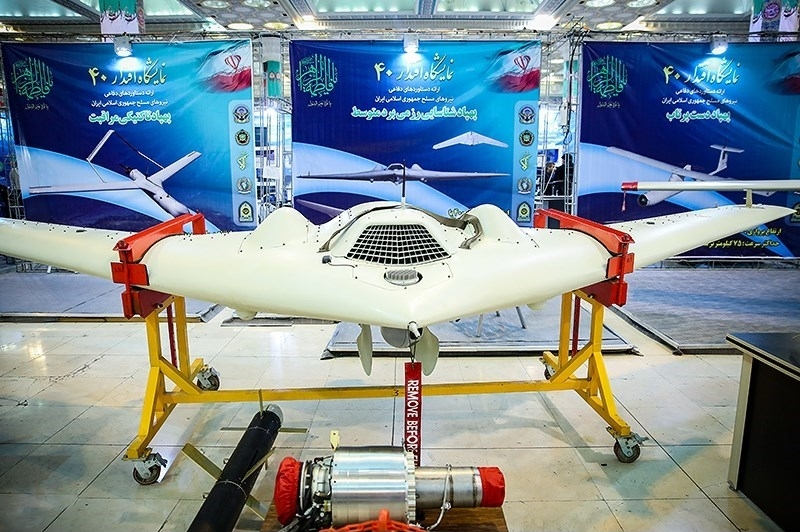
Saegheh, the drone allegedly used in the operation

A field commander of an Iranian-backed group in the area who spoke to The New York Times on the condition of anonymity, said shortly after the missiles struck, Iranian drones fired some rockets at the target. A Fars News Agency report also said seven drones were launched to hit the position. According to Farzin Nadimi of The Washington Institute, Saegheh UAVs (a smaller version of Simorgh), which carry Sadid electro-optically guided bombs, were used in the attack. He also mentions that the UAVs may have taken off from Shahid Karimi base located near Kashan, where it is known that they are in service and the target would be within range.

=== Casualties ===
Following the attack, the IRGC issued an official statement stating that "many terrorists" were killed and injured. Brigadier General Amir Ali Hajizadeh, commander of the IRGC's Aerospace Force, told Iranian media "[b]ased on the information we have received, around 40 top leaders of Daesh were killed in this attack".

The Syrian Observatory for Human Rights, a UK-based organization, confirmed that the headquarters of ISIL in the area was hit but announced it was unaware of the casualties.

== Reactions ==
- Iraq: Hashim Almosawa, spokesperson for the al-Nujaba Brigade of the Popular Mobilization Forces praised the attack, stating "Iran could have launched the rockets from Syria, but they have sent a strong and accurate message to the terrorists and those who support them that our rockets could hit any one of you", adding that "Iran has the right to retaliate and defend itself".
- Syria: Syrian government made no immediate reaction to the attack.
- United States: Cmdr. Sean Robertson, spokesperson for the Department of Defense said in a statement that Iran did not notify the United States, calling the operation "reckless, unsafe and escalatory". He added "[t]he United States now has to think about putting air defense assets in Iraq to protect against rogue Iranian missiles that are being launched across Iraq to supposedly target terrorist groups".

== Analyses ==
Talal Atrissi, a researcher at Al Maaref University, said that the attack had two messages: threats made by Iran will be carried out, and the sanctions won't prevent Iran from defending itself.

Clément Therme of the International Institute for Strategic Studies maintains that the operation was a show of force with domestic use.

Ibrahim al-Marashi, associate professor of California State University San Marcos, opines that the attack was intended to send "diplomatic signals to players both in the region and internationally". Sanam Vakil, an adjunct professor at The Johns Hopkins University SAIS Europe, also interpreted the operation similarly, stating Iran "doesn't respond kind-for-kind, but a bit like whack-a-mole in another theater. It wouldn’t respond directly to Saudi Arabia or directly the United States, but the messaging goes out to U.S. or Gulf opponents".

Ali Fathollah-Nejad, visiting fellow at the Brookings Doha Center and an associate with the Iran Project at Harvard University, commented that Iran has used the opportunity to test its missiles. Farzin Nadimi of The Washington Institute wrote that "reports suggest the Qiam missiles used in the latest attack were an improved version, as first shown on Iranian TV days ago, with “maneuverable separating reentry vehicle and warhead”".

== See also ==
- 2017 Deir ez-Zor missile strike
- 2018 Iraqi Kurdistan missile strike
- Operation Martyr Soleimani
