= Fath 360 =

Iranian tactical ballistic missile

Fath-360
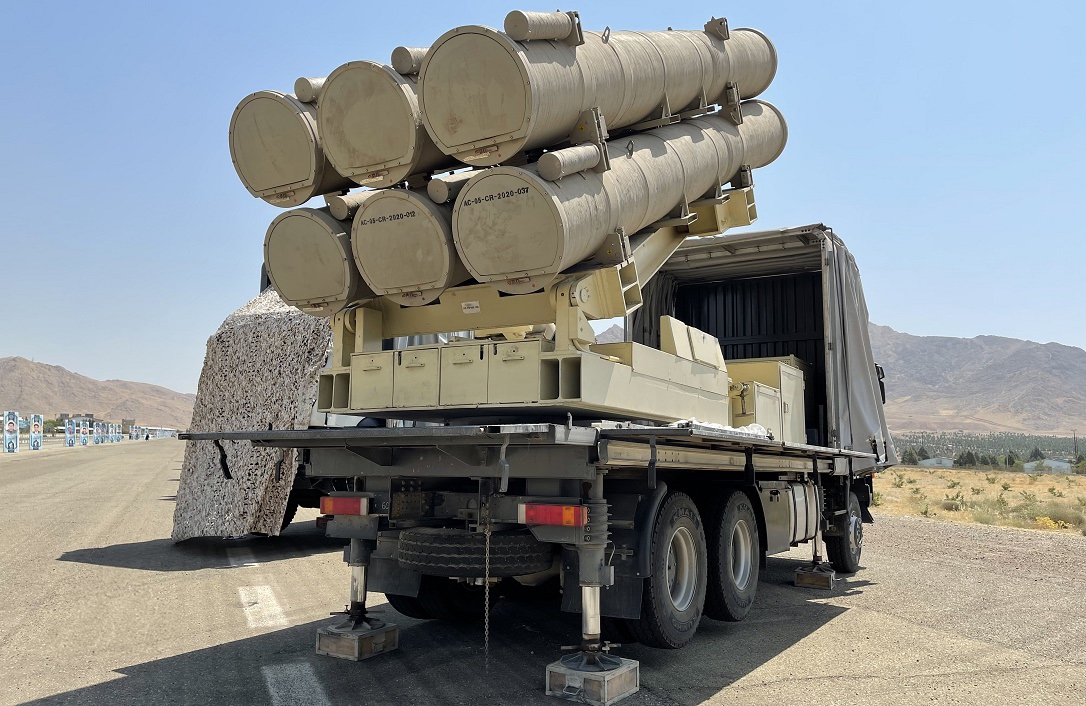
- Type: Tactical ballistic missile
- Place of origin: Iran

Service history
- Used by: See operators

Production history
- No. built: Unknown
- Variants: Fath-360L

Specifications
- Mass: 787 kg (1,735 lb) (total weight); 150 kg (330 lb) (warhead)
- Length: 5,175 mm (203.7 in) (Missile)
- Diameter: 368 mm (14.5 in)
- Effective firing range: 30–120 km (19–75 mi); Fath-360L: 180 km (110 mi); Fath-450: 250 km (160 mi)
- Warhead: High-explosive
- Warhead weight: 150 kg (330 lb); 225 kg (496 lb) Fath-450
- Maximum speed: Mach 3 (At Launch); Mach 4 (On Impact); Mach 5 (Fath-450)
- Guidance system: GNSS, INS
- Accuracy: Less than 30 m (98 ft)

Fath-360 (Persian: فتح-۳۶۰), also known as BM-120, is an Iranian short-range satellite-guided tactical ballistic missile announced on the Islamic Republic of Iran Army Day, April 18, 2022. They are built by the Aerospace Industries Organization (AIO). The Fath-360 is reportedly among the ballistic missiles Iran provided Russia during its invasion of Ukraine.

== History ==
On August 10, 2024, Reuters claimed that Russian soldiers were visiting Iran to train on the Fath 360, following up on a previous contract allegedly signed on December 13th between the two countries. It was reported that Russia received the missiles on September 4, 2024.

== Design ==
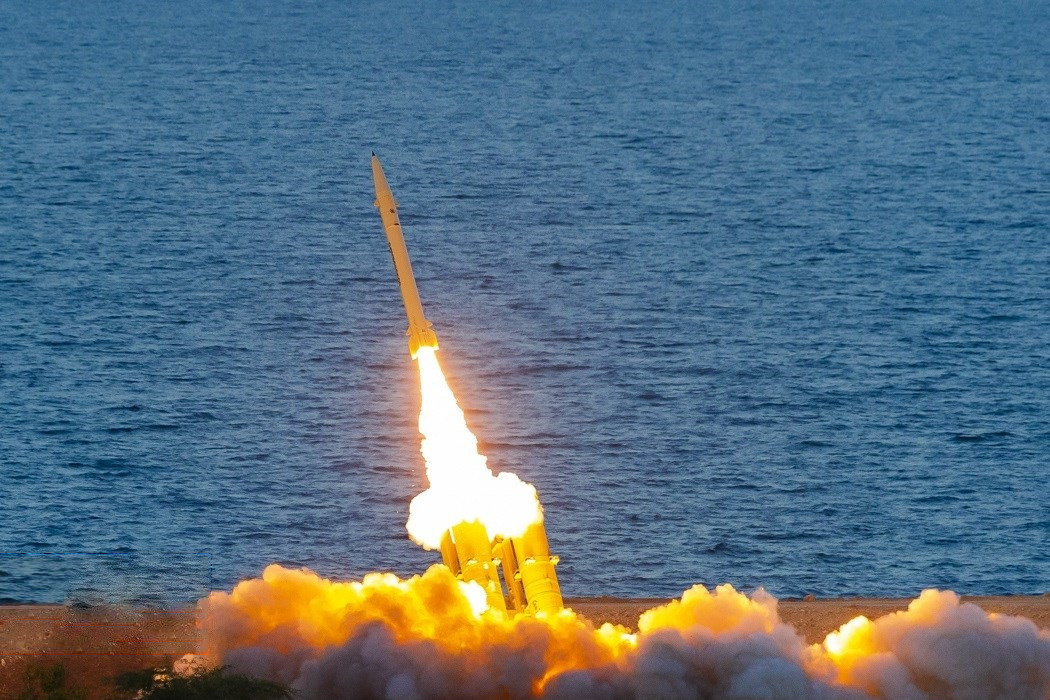
Fath-360 firing during a military exercise.

It is believed that Fath 360 is a shorter version of Fateh family of SRBMs. Its light weight and small dimensions allow several of these missiles to be put on a truck-based launcher.

With 30 to 120 km (19 to 75 mi) of range, each can carry a 150 kg (330 lb) warhead and be launched with the speed of Mach 3 (1020 m/s). Then they connect to satellites for rapid homing and hit their targets with the speed of Mach 4 (1361 m/s).

=== Missile ===
The Fath 360 was first shown under the name of Fath in a military exhibition on August 21, 2020. As a family of Fateh SRBMs, it is almost half the size of a Fateh-110. But it has the same configuration of fins. Four at the end of it near the exhaust, four other triangular shaped fins just above them and four small ones in front of missile near the nosecone. A new variant called Fath-360L was showcased and has a range of 180km.

=== Launcher ===
The missile is launched through a round launch container on a truck-based TEL. The Fath-360 launcher comes with two, three, four or six-round launch containers each carrying one missile. with these characteristics it can act like a GMLRS.

=== Guidance ===
Fath 360 uses GNSS guidance and is believed to be using GLONASS satellite navigation system as its guidance. The missile is also believed to be using INS as a secondary guidance system.

== Operators ==
- Iran
  - Iranian Armed Forces
    - Artesh (Army)
      - Ground Forces
    - IRGC (Sepah)
      - Ground Forces
- Russia
  - Russian Armed Forces

== Operational history ==
Fath-360 was first test fired during the Eghtedar 1401 military drills at Nasrabad, Isfahan.

Reports also say that Fath-360 has been used to attack the positions of KDPI in Northern Iraq on September 28, 2022.^{See 2022 Koya bombings.}

In September 2024, Ukrainian intelligence claimed that 200 missiles were delivered to Russia. Sources from European intelligence told Reuters in August 2024 that Russian personnel are being trained in Iran to operate Fath-360 missiles.

Fath 360 missiles were used in war games in late February 2026, just before the 2026 Iran War started.

Fath-360 missiles are believed to undergo final assembly in the Kuh-e Barjamali site, which is part of Iran's Khojir Aerospace Complex southeast of Tehran. The site was bombed by the US on 7 March 2026.
