= Gary Milhollin =

Gary Milhollin is the founder of the Wisconsin Project on Nuclear Arms Control, a non-profit organization dedicated to stemming the spread of nuclear and other weapons of mass destruction. He served as executive director of the Wisconsin Project for twenty-five years. Milhollin and the Wisconsin Project are best known for digging up the details of dangerous nuclear deals and publishing them in the media. Their purpose has been to discourage such deals through public embarrassment.

== Career ==
Milhollin's work has been covered by a number of media profiles. He has been characterized as an "arms trade sleuth," a "nuke tracker," a "self-appointed watchdog," a "crusader," and a "private citizen turned private eye." He has also been criticized for taking a "blunt instrument approach" and for holding "hawkish views on U.S. foreign policy."

One of Milhollin's earliest achievements came in 1986, when he revealed that Norway, because of a secret export of heavy water to Israel, had the right to inspect Israel's Dimona reactor, where the heavy water had been used to produce plutonium, a nuclear weapon fuel. Milhollin's study on this secret export, together with his op-eds in the Norwegian and American press, forced Israel to return half of the heavy water to Norway and brought Norway to abandon its nuclear export business.

In the 1990s Milhollin and the Wisconsin Project continued to advocate for stronger controls on dangerous exports. In July 1990, Milhollin and the Project revealed in The Washington Post that the Western countries were dropping export controls on items that Iraq was using to build nuclear weapons and missiles. The revelations triggered steps by the United States and its allies to recontrol many of the items.

Similar revelations continued throughout the 1990s. In 1995, an article in The New York Times revealed that China was the source of poison gas ingredients being smuggled to Iran and that the United States planned to free for export supercomputers that the Pentagon was using to develop the next generation of American weapons. In 1996, another article in The New York Times warned that the United States was about to allow the export of American supercomputers that Russia would use to design nuclear warheads—a media revelation that blocked the sale. In 1997, Milhollin published the fact that a Russian nuclear weapon laboratory had managed to import American supercomputers without the required export license which led Congress to strengthen controls on supercomputer exports. And in 1998, after India and Pakistan tested nuclear weapons in May of that year, the U.S. government used data that Milhollin and the Project had compiled to sanction 63 organizations linked to those countries' nuclear and missile programs.

In 2000, Milhollin and the Wisconsin Project launched a program to improve export controls in the former Soviet Union and Eastern Europe. With sponsorship from the Departments of State and Defense, Milhollin and the Wisconsin Project have given export control training to several hundred officials from some 30 countries.

In 2006, when a company from Dubai sought permission to manage an American port, Milhollin gave Congress information showing that Dubai and other ports in the United Arab Emirates had long been transshipment points for the nuclear black market The information helped block the company's application. In 2007, Milhollin and the Project supplied information to the United Nations, the United States and the European Union that led to a freeze on the assets of several Iranian organizations linked to nuclear and missile work. In 2009, Milhollin helped the New York County District Attorney's Office investigate Chinese shipments of nuclear and missile items to Iran. He testified before a grand jury in New York City that later indicted the Chinese company that made the sales. His most recent publications were in 2013, when he supplied two commentaries to Bloomberg View. In one he warned against making a half-deal with Iran that could produce the same result as in North Korea, and in the other he argued that Iran was playing a long nuclear game that the United States was not successfully countering.

The Wisconsin Project on Nuclear Arms Control, which Milhollin founded in 1986, publishes the Iran Watch web site, an online clearinghouse for articles and analysis about Iran's nuclear and missile programs. It also publishes the Risk Report, a subscription database that governments and private companies use to screen business transactions and verify the legitimacy of foreign buyers. Previously, the Wisconsin Project published Iraq Watch, a web site that tracked Saddam Hussein's nuclear, chemical and missile programs.

=== Teaching ===
Milhollin served on the faculty at the University of Wisconsin Law School from 1976 to 1998, where is now an emeritus professor. He has written articles for publications such as The New York Times, Wall Street Journal, Washington Post, The New Yorker, Foreign Policy, and Commentary, has testified frequently before Congressional committees, and has been quoted widely in the international press. His articles and testimony are concerned with topics such as the control of dangerous exports, U.S. policy toward Iran, and Chinese weapon transfers. A list of his publications and testimony can be found on the Wisconsin Project website.

While in his teaching position, Milhollin gave courses on nuclear arms proliferation at the University of Wisconsin and as a visiting professor at Princeton University. For over a decade he was also an Administrative Judge, part-time, at the U.S. Nuclear Regulatory Commission, where he presided over hearings following the accident at Three Mile Island. Before entering teaching, he practiced international corporate law in New York and Paris.

Milhollin was born in Indiana, where he received a degree in mechanical engineering from Purdue University. He received his J.D. from Georgetown University in 1965.
