= Kheibar (missile) =

Kheibar (Khorramshahr 4)
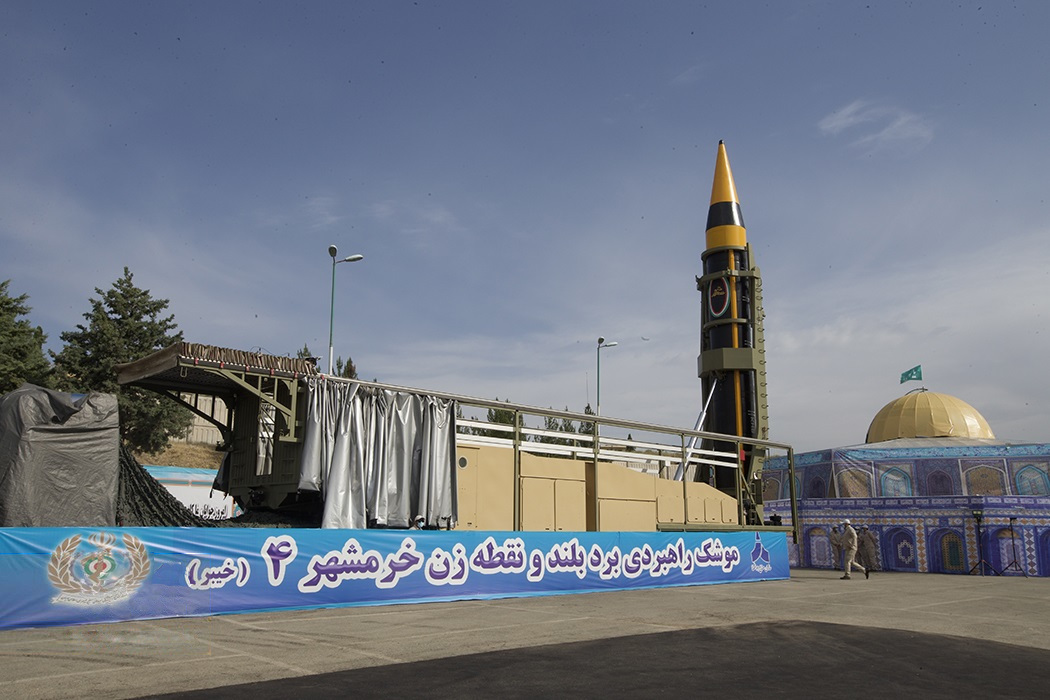
- Kheibar missile unveiling by Iran's defense minister
- Type: Tactical MRBM
- Place of origin: Iran

Service history
- In service: 2023–present
- Used by: Iran

Production history
- Manufacturer: Iran

Specifications
- Warhead: 1,500–1,800 kg
- Engine: liquid fuel rocket
- Operational range: 2,000 km (estimated up to 4,000 km)
- Accuracy: 10–30 m CEP

The Kheibar (Persian: خیبر), also known as Khorramshahr-4, is an Iranian medium-range ballistic missile from the fourth generation of the Khorramshahr missile family manufactured by the Ministry of Defense of the Islamic Republic of Iran. This missile was unveiled on Thursday, June 4, 2023, in the presence of Mohammad Reza Ashtiani, Minister of Defense of the Islamic Republic. The Khoramshahr ballistic missile offers a range of 2,000 km and can carry a 1,500-kilogram warhead.

== Development ==
The missile was unveiled by the Iran's Defense Minister Mohammad-Reza Gharaei Ashtiani on 25 May 2023 coinciding with the anniversary of the liberation of Khorramshahr.

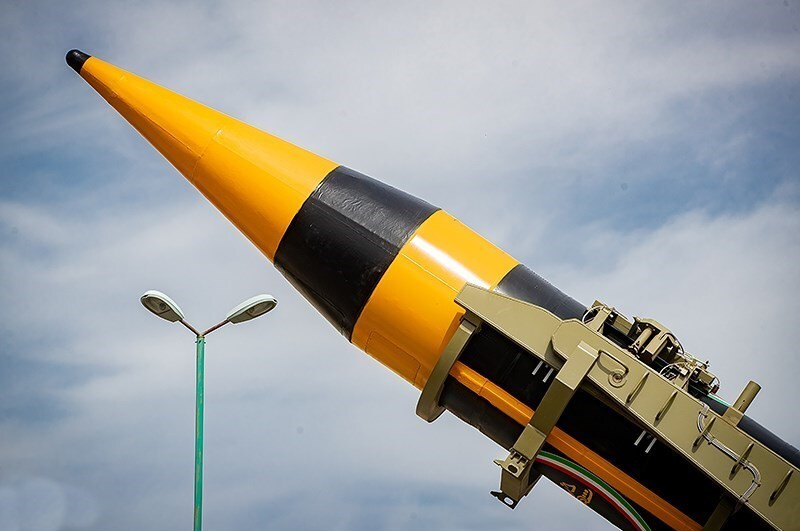
Kheibar has a range of 2,000 kilometres and can carry a 1,500 kilogram warhead.

The missile was officially deployed in early February 2026.

== Naming ==
The Khorramshahr-4 is named after Khorramshahr, an Iranian city that was the scene of heavy fighting - known as the Battle of Khorramshahr - during the Iran–Iraq War in the 1980s. The missile is also called Khaybar, after a mostly Jewish fortress conquered by Muslims in the 7th century during the Battle of Khaybar in Arabia.

== Operational history ==
The missile was tested in 2023.

IRGC announced the firing of Kheibar missiles in the tenth wave of Operation True Promise 4 during the US-Israeli war with Iran. According to Iran, the 22nd wave of "Operation True Promise" began with the mass firing of Kheiber and Fattah missiles with the code "O Hussein bin Ali (AS)".

On 19 June 2025 Iran reportedly launched at Israel a Khorramshar-4 ballistic missile with a cluster munition warhead.

CNN Turk, while showcasing the new version of the Khorramshahr 4 missile, stated that this missile and other missiles possessed by Iran could cause serious damage to American warships.
