= Fateh-313 =

Iranian tactical short-range ballistic missile

Fateh 313
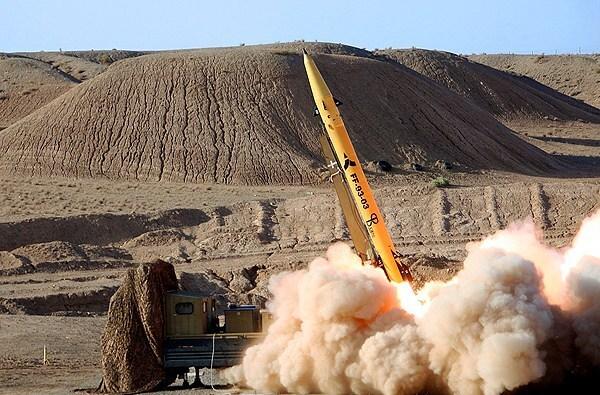
- Type: Tactical SRBM

Service history
- Used by: See § Operators
- Wars: Operation Martyr Soleimani

Production history
- Manufacturer: Iran

Specifications
- Mass: 3,245 kg
- Length: 8,756 mm
- Diameter: 612 mm
- Warhead weight: 380 kg
- Engine: single-stage solid rocket motor
- Operational range: 300-500 km
- Guidance system: Inertial & electro-optical terminal
- Launch platform: mobile launcher

Fateh-313 (Persian: فاتح-313, "Conqueror-313"), an Iranian solid-fuel short-range ballistic missile, was unveiled on 21 August 2015. It is almost identical to the previous generation, the Fateh-110, but reportedly utilizes a new composite fuel and body. Iran’s Defense Ministry plans to mass produce the missile.

== Design ==
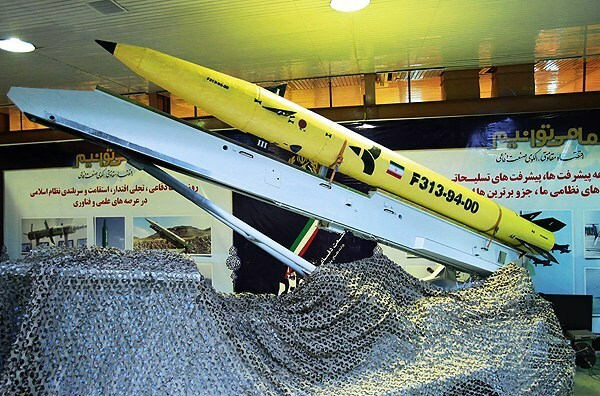
Fateh-313 Missile

The Fateh-313 missile is 8756mm in length and 612mm in diameter. It reportedly utilizes a new composite fuel and body, which may have increased the range to 450–500 km, from the Fateh-110's 300 km.

Based on battle damage analysis of the January 2020 attack on American military bases, Iran Watch estimates that the circular error probable is 10-30m. The Economist reported a CEP of 10m for some of the missiles involved in the attack; Qiam 1 missiles were also used.

== History ==
Fateh-313 missiles were launched by the Iranians against US positions in Iraq in January 2020 in retaliation for the assassination of Qassem Soleimani.

The Islamic Resistance in Iraq, an informal network of Iranian-backed Shia Islamist factions, claims to operate a missile called the Aqsa-1, which per Institute for Study of War bears visual similarities to the Fateh-313.

== Operators ==
- Iran
- Ba'athist Syria
- Houthis - as "Asef" anti-ship ballistic missile

== See also ==
- Ballistic missile program of Iran
- Iranian military industry
- Iranian underground missile bases
- Science and technology in Iran
