= Fattah-1 =

Iranian medium-range ballistic missile

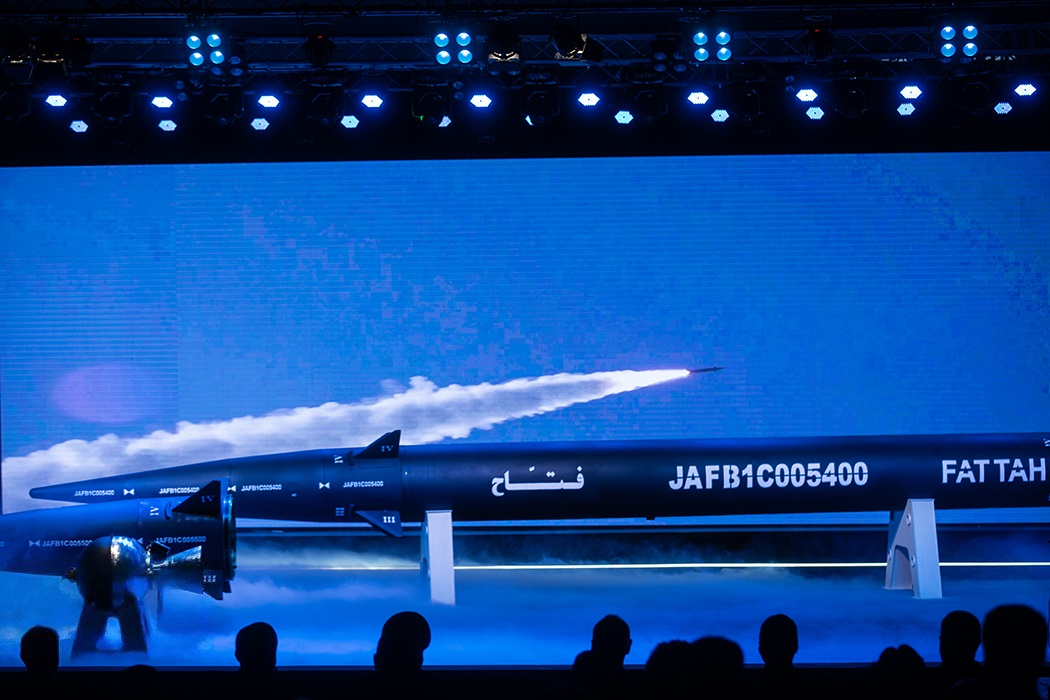
- Fattah-1's presentation, 2023
- Type: Medium-range ballistic missile
- Place of origin: Iran

Service history
- Used by: Iran
- Wars: List: October 2024 Iranian strikes on Israel; Twelve-Day War; 2026 Iran war

Production history
- Designer: IRGC engineers
- Manufacturer: AIO
- Produced: 2022

Specifications
- Warhead: Conventional; Nuclear (allegedly)
- Warhead weight: 350–450 kg (770–990 lb)
- Propellant: Stage 1:Solid fuel engine Stage 2: Liquid fuel engine
- Operational range: 1,400 km (870 mi)
- Maximum speed: Mach 13-15

Fattah-1 (Persian: فتاح, lit. 'conqueror') is an Iranian medium-range ballistic missile developed by the Islamic Revolutionary Guard Corps and unveiled in June 2023. Iran has described the missile as "hypersonic", a description which has been noted as "dubious" by several media outlets including Calcalist, the Times of Israel and The War Zone; and by analyst Fabian Hinz as "obscur[ing] more than it illuminates." According to Iran, its high maneuverability and speed helps it to evade missile defense systems. In November 2023, Iran unveiled a newer version of the missile, Fattah-2.

== Description ==
According to Iran, it can maneuver in and out of the atmosphere, and is capable of bypassing missile defenses. Iran describes it as a hypersonic missile. However, according to Fabian Hinz, research fellow for Defense and Military Analysis at the International Institute for Strategic Studies, Fattah does not fall under the general classification of hypersonic weapons, but is rather a medium-range ballistic missile (MRBM) that has a “second stage [that] incorporates the warhead, aerodynamic controls and a small solid-propellant motor with a moveable nozzle for thrust vector control (TVC) that resembles a maneuverable reentry vehicle (MaRV)" rather than a hypersonic glide vehicle, meaning it can only maneuver for a short part of the flight in the terminal phase. Hinz noted that “Iran attempted to overcome this limitation by mating a small TVC rocket motor to a MaRV, enabling exo-atmospheric maneuvering."

Arash Marzbanmehr, a pro-IRGC military analyst, has defined Fattah and Kheibar Shekan missiles as near-hypersonic or quasi-hypersonic missiles.

== History ==
On 10 November 2022, during the 11th anniversary of the death of Hassan Tehrani Moghaddam, known as the "father of Iranian missiles", Iran announced it has built an advanced hypersonic ballistic missile calling it a "major generational leap". Brigadier General Amir Ali Hajizadeh, IRGC Aerospace Force commander, said the missile has a high velocity and can maneuver below and above the Earth's atmosphere. He said "it can breach all the systems of anti-missile defence" and added that he believed it would take decades before a system capable of intercepting it is developed. The missile was unveiled in a ceremony on 6 June 2023.

Iran may have used Fattah-1 missiles in its strikes against Israel on 1 October 2024, according to an analysis by The New York Times. According to Dr. Jeffrey Lewis, researchers from the James Martin Center for Nonproliferation Studies (CNS) have identified Fattah-1 debris from both the 1 October strikes as well as the April 2024 Iranian strikes against Israel.

On 18 June 2025, Iran claimed it had launched several Fattah-1 missiles at Israel in a renewed round of overnight strikes during the Twelve-Day War.

According to Iran, the 22nd wave of "Operation True Promise" during the 2026 Iran war began with the mass firing of Kheiber and Fattah missiles with the code "O Hussein bin Ali (AS)".

== Gallery ==
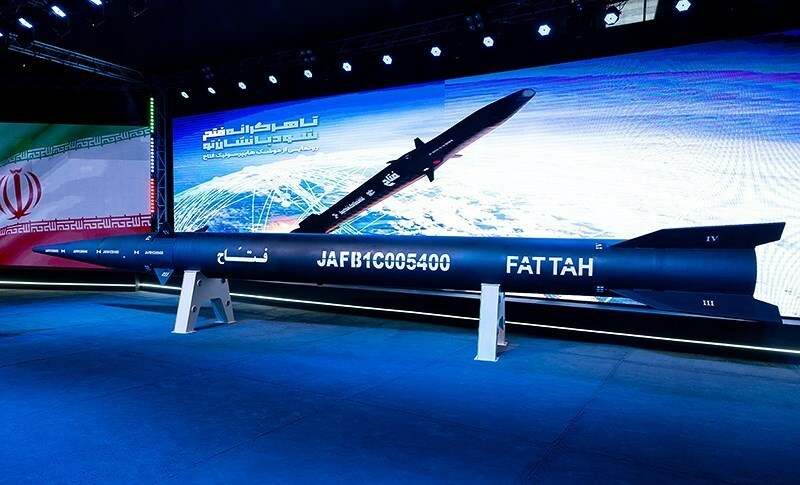
Fattah in unveiling ceremony on 6 June 2023

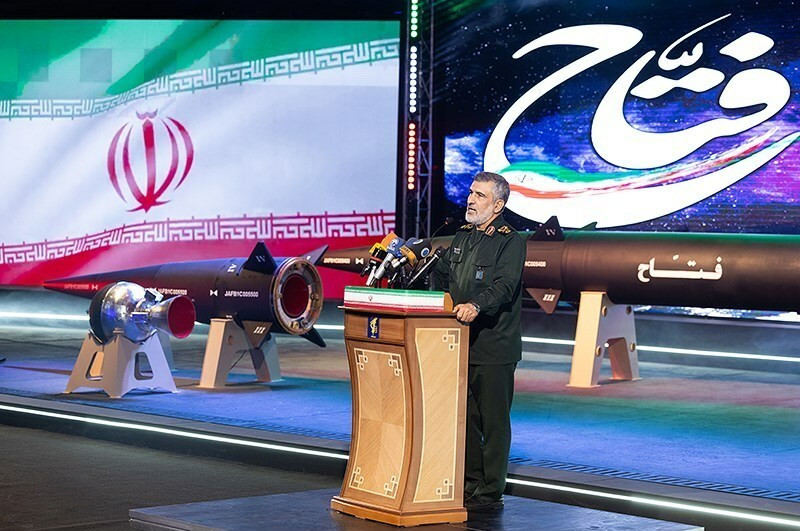
Brigadier General Amir Ali Hajizadeh in unveiling ceremony

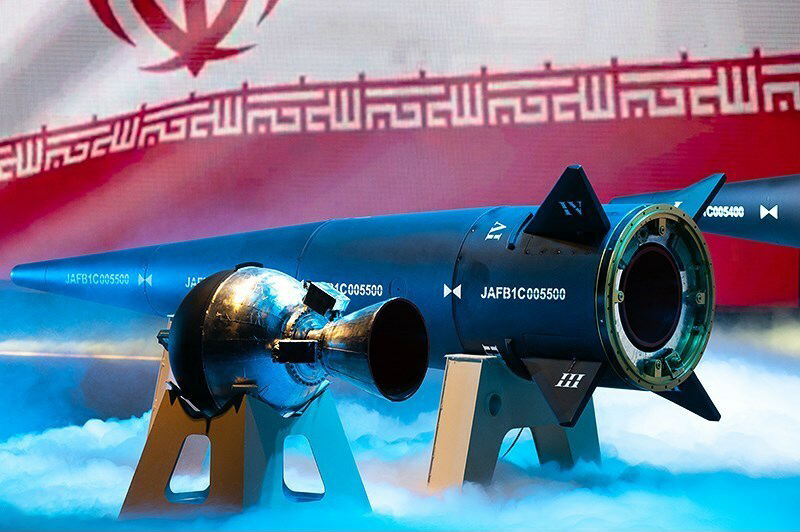
Final Stage with Rocket Motor
