= 2018 Koy Sanjaq missile strike =

Koy Sanjaq missile strike
- Part of Western Iran clashes (2016–2023)
- Type: Missile strike
- Location: Koy Sanjaq, Kurdistan Region, Iraq; 36.0644°N 44.6036°E
- Target: Headquarters of Democratic Party of Iranian Kurdistan and Kurdistan Democratic Party
- Date: 8 September 2018
- Executed by: Islamic Revolutionary Guard Corps: Aerospace Force
- Casualties: 18 killed 50 injured
- Location of the KDPI and HDK base

On 8 September 2018, Iran's Islamic Revolutionary Guards Corps (IRGC) launched seven Fateh-110 missiles at the headquarters of two Iranian Kurdish opposition parties in Koy Sanjaq, located in Iraq's semi-autonomous Kurdish region. Initial reports from Iranian news agencies listed 11 killed people. Later reports indicated 18 people were killed.

== Background ==
In the months preceding the attack, some attacks were carried out by Iraqi Kurdish rebels on the borders of the Islamic Republic of Iran in order to carry out acts of sabotage in the provinces such as West Azerbaijan province, Kermanshah and Kurdistan. Therefore, the Islamic Revolutionary Guard Corps fought against them at the Kamyaran border the previous week.

According to the IRGC, the target of the missile strike was described as intending to bring an end to "terrorist and aggressive actions against Iran". The attack took place after ignoring serious warnings by officials of the Kurdistan Regional Government about Iran's determination to dismantle their bases.

== Casualties ==
According to initial reports the missile strike led to the death of 12 people and 50 others injured, party officials stated. Later reporting indicated the death toll had risen to 18, six of whom were members of the central committee of HDK. Rahman Piroti was among them. Also, leaders of HDK, Mustafa Mouloudi and Khalid Azizi were wounded.

== Reaction ==
On 15 September 2018, the rebel group tried to attack Iran embassy in France. They burned Iran's flag in front of the embassy and broke the windows with stones. The Rebel group was identified as Kurdish activists, according to Reuters.

On 17 September 2018, 10 members of the anarchist group Rouvikonas riding motorbikes hurled bottles of paint at the outer walls of the Iranian Embassy in Athens.

== See also ==
- 2018 Marivan border crossing attack
- 2017 Deir ez-Zor missile strike
