= Khorramshahr (missile) =

Iranian medium-range ballistic missile

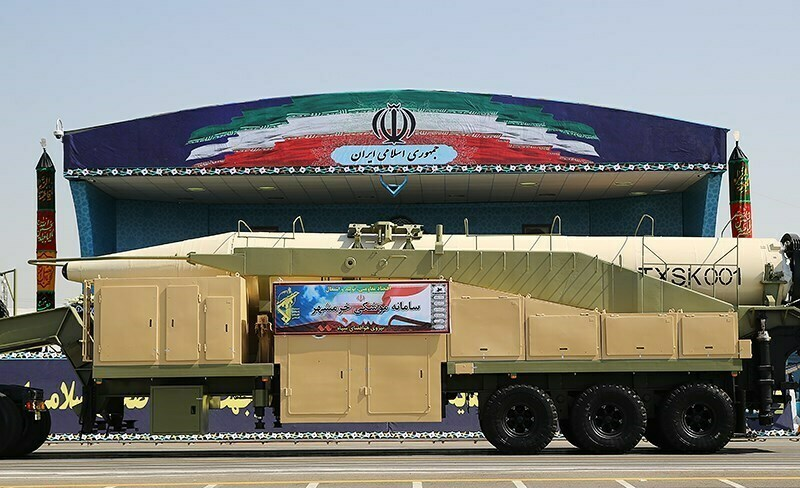
- Type: MRBM or IRBM
- Place of origin: Iran

Production history
- Manufacturer: Defense industry of Iran

Specifications
- Mass: 19.5 tons
- Length: 13 m
- Diameter: 1.5 m
- Engine: liquid fuel rocket
- Operational range: 2,000 km with a 1,800 kg warhead
- Maximum speed: Mach 8–16
- Launch platform: mobile

The Khorramshahr (Persian: خرمشهر) is an Iranian liquid-fueled medium-range ballistic missile or intermediate-range ballistic missile that was first tested in January 2017. It can carry a 1,800 kg warhead, is 13 m in length, and is named after the city of Khorramshahr.

The missile's range is disputed. Iranian state media reports a range of up to 2,000 km. Western sources report that the range is or could be more than 2,000 km, possibly 2,500 or 3,000 km. These longer ranges would classify it as an intermediate-range ballistic missile. The missile has three known variants (Khorramshahr-1, Khorramshahr-2, and Khorramshahr-4), each possibly with their own specifications.

== Overview ==
Jane's Defence Weekly and Center for Strategic and International Studies stated that it is the Iranian version of North Korea's Hwasong-10. North Korea sold a version of this missile to Iran under the designation BM-25. The number 25 represents the missile's range of 2,500 km. Iran said it has decreased the missile size over the initial version, reducing the propellant mass and range. Such a range covers targets in Israel, Egypt and Saudi Arabia, and NATO members Romania, Bulgaria and Greece, if fired from Western Iran.

The IRGC Commander of the Aerospace Division, Brigadier General Amir Ali Hajizadeh, stated that the Iranian variant "has become smaller in size and more tactical", which may explain the missile's decreased range. A second theory asserts that Iranian officials do not want to raise concern in Europe about their missile program, and are purposely underestimating the range. Iran said in 2017 that Supreme Leader Ayatollah Khamenei had limited the range of ballistic missiles to 2,000 km. The IISS's Michael Elleman said that Iran could likely go beyond the original range of 2,000 kilometers with its Khorramshahr ballistic missile, though the range in testing was limited by adding a heavy warhead.

Due to the heavy payload, it has the potential to carry nuclear warheads. It is uncertain whether it can carry multiple nuclear warheads due to its size.

The gas output from these rockets, range, warheads, and rocket launchers are different. In the Khorramshahr missile, there is some small separated gas output from the big one in the center to control the missile without wings. The gas output model of the Khorramshahr missile is more like the Hwasong-12.

Brigadier General Amir Ali Hajizadeh, the commander of Aerospace Force of the IRGC, said that Khorramshahr is a missile with a multiple-warhead capability.

In 2019, the United Kingdom, France, and Germany claimed that Iran had a version of the khorramshahr with a smaller 750 kg warhead/nose cone, and that their modeling puts this version of the missile at approximately 3,000 km range.

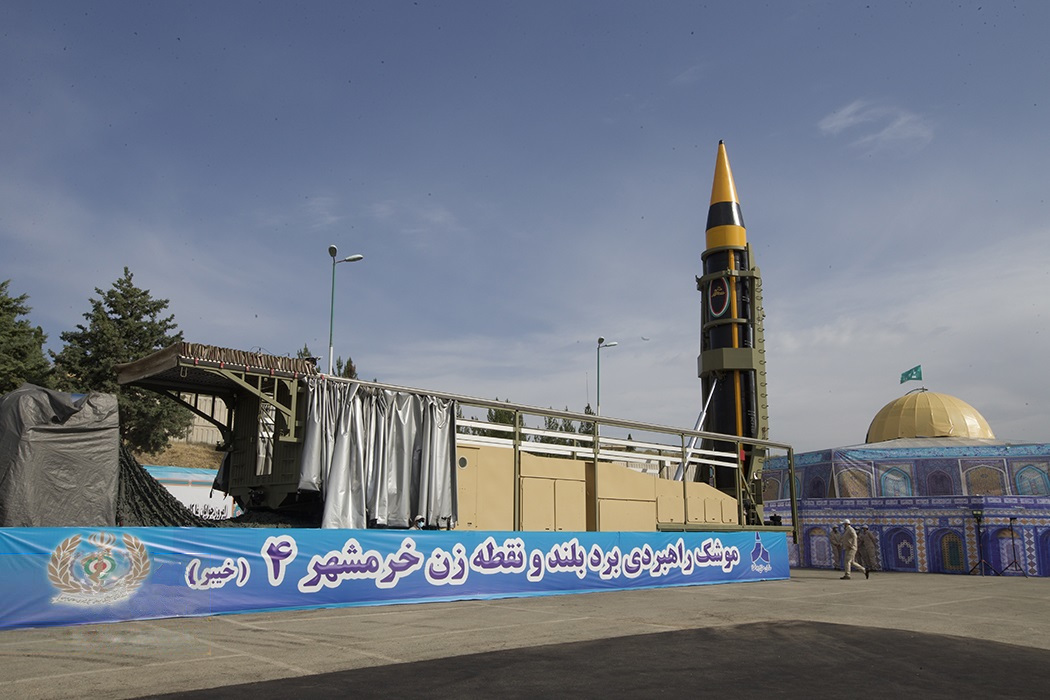
A Khorramshahr-4 ballistic missile

The Khorramshahr-4 was unveiled on 25 May 2023. The new variant is reported to have a range of 2,000 km with a 1,500 kg warhead. It has a more advanced engine that uses hypergolic fuel, which can be stored in tanks for years, shortening the launch preparation time to 12 minutes. The new propellant requires smaller tanks, reducing the motor section to about 13 m, with the warhead adding about 4 m to the missile's length. It has an airframe made of a stronger composite material, and a mid-phase navigation system that enables it to correct its course when outside of the atmosphere, so it is not reliant on terminal guidance that can be disrupted by electronic warfare systems. The wikipedia article for the Khorramshahr-4 is at Kheibar (missile).

== History ==
In September 2016, Iran announced that they would start production of the missile. The missile was first tested in January 2017 and unveiled in September 2017. The Khorramshahr's first test-firing on 29 January 2017 was unsuccessful, with the missile exploding prematurely. Fox News reports that the missile exploded after flying about 600 miles (~950 km), while Reuters reports that the missile exploded after 630 miles (1,010 km). Iran reported that they test fired a Khorramshahr missile on 22 September 2017, but the US disputed the claim, saying that Iran never fired a ballistic missile and that the footage was reused from the failed January 2017 test. CNN, quoting anonymous American sources, reported that US radars and sensors "picked up no indication" of a ballistic missile launch in the days surrounding the reported test. Washington Institute for Near East Policy and Foundation for Defense of Democracies report that there was a secret, earlier, and also unsuccessful test of the Khorramshahr missile on July 11, 2016. Most other sources report that the July 2016 test was a North Korean Hwasong-10 missile.

A "Khorramshahr variant" was test launched in December 2018, according to Israel.The Khorramshahr was tested again as of August 2020, with a small re-entry vehicle (RV) that extends its range and possibly its accuracy. In June 2025, the Israeli Air Force destroyed Khorramshahr missiles in their warehouse at Iran's Imam Hussein missile base in Yazd Province central Iran. In January 2026, Iran Watch assessed the Khorramshahr's status as "possibly deployed." Iran test-fired Khorramshahr missiles on February 5 and February 8 2026, just before the 2026 war, likely as a demonstration of capabilities against the US.

Iran launched Khorramshahr-4 missiles at Tel Aviv during the 2026 Iran war. The IRGC said that in the 19th phase of the operation, the missiles were launched toward central Tel Aviv, Ben Gurion Airport, and an Israeli air base, and there were reports of fires and damage in multiple locations.

== See also ==
- Military of Iran
- Iranian military industry
- List of military equipment manufactured in Iran
- Iran's missile forces
- Shahab-3
- Sejjil
- Equipment of the Iranian Army
- Science and technology in Iran
