= Dari, Iran =

Dari دري
- Village
- Location within Iran
- Coordinates: 35°27′30″N 46°20′30″E
- Country: Iran
- Province: Kurdistan
- County: Marivan
- Bakhsh: Central
- Rural District: Sarkal

Population (2006)
  - Total: 770
- Time zone: UTC+3:30 (IRST)
  - Summer (DST): UTC+4:30 (IRDT)

Dari (Persian: دري, also Romanized as Darī; also known as Darreh) is a village in Sarkal Rural District, in the Central District of Marivan County, Kurdistan Province, Iran. At the 2006 census, its population was 770, in 176 families. The village is populated by Kurds.
