= Zolfaghar (missile) =

Iranian short range ballistic missile

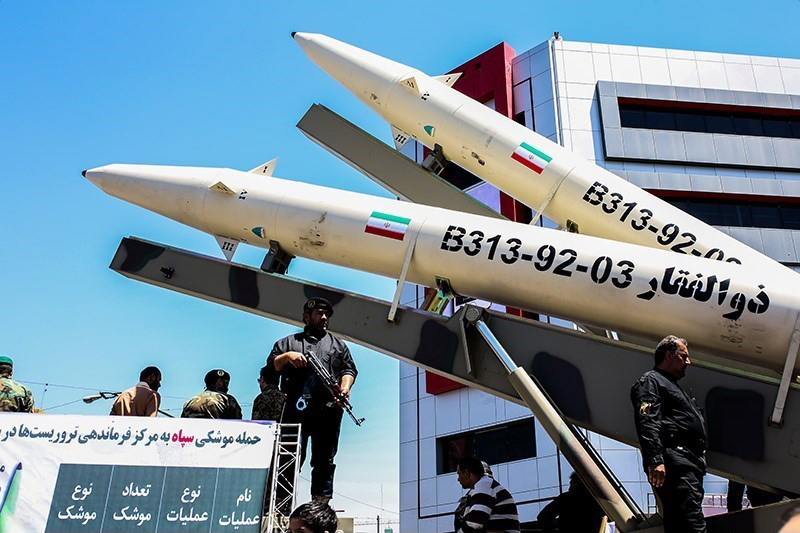
- Zolfaghar
- Type: SRBM
- Place of origin: Iran

Service history
- In service: 2017–present

Production history
- Manufacturer: IRGC AF
- Variants: Zolfaqar Basir

Specifications
- Length: 10.3 m (34 ft)
- Diameter: 0.68 m (2.2 ft)
- Propellant: Single-stage Solid-propelled
- Operational range: 700 km (430 mi)
- Guidance system: INS, GPS
- Accuracy: 100 m (330 ft) CEP estimated

The Zolfaghar (Persian: ذوالفقار) missile is an Iranian road-mobile, single-stage, solid-propelled short-range ballistic missile. The Zolfaghar missile is part of the Fateh-110 SRBM family and is possibly derived from the Fateh-313 missile in particular. It was unveiled in 2016 and entered service in 2017. It was first used in the 2017 Deir ez-Zor missile strike and was therefore the first ballistic missile fired by Iran in anger in 30 years. It is named after Zulfiqar, the sword of Ali ibn Abi Talib.

== Design ==
According to Iranian sources, the Zolfaghar missile has a length of 10.3 m (34 ft), a diameter of 0.68 m (2.2 ft), and a launch weight of 4,615 kg (10,174 lb) with a 590 kg (1,300 lb) warhead. The warhead is designed to separate in the missile's midcourse phase, making it more difficult to detect, track, and intercept than unibody missiles like the 9K720 Iskander. Another source claims a warhead weight of 579 kilograms.

The Zolfaghar's body is made using filament-wound fiber as opposed to the metal bodies of earlier Fateh-family missiles, which reduces its weight and improves range. The missile has a claimed range of 700 km, which is significantly more than earlier Fateh-family missiles. According to Janes, the range is considered largely proven based on the 2017 Deir ez-Zor missile strike, where Zolfaghar missiles were used to strike targets from 600 km away.

The Zolfaghar (and possibly other members of the Fateh-110 family) are believed to use commercial GNSS systems to improve accuracy. According to Mehr News, the missile is designed and manufactered by Iran's state-owned Aerospace Industries Organization.

According to a 2019 letter sent by UK, Germany, and France to the UN, Iran has demonstrated manoeuvring re-entry vehicle (MERV) technology on its Zolfaghar missile.

According to Iranian media sources, a naval variant called the "Zolfaqar Basir" has also been developed, which the IRGC claims has a range of more than 700 km (430 mi).

In February 2019 Iran unveiled a new longer range version of the Zolfaghar missile called the Dezful missile with a range of 1,000 km (620 mi); this range would classify it as an MRBM.

== History ==
It was first unveiled during a military parade aboard a vehicle decorated with an anti-Zionist banner on 25 September 2016 after which Defense Minister Hossein Dehqan claimed that the missile had a range of 700 km (430 mi). Some sources noted the irony of the anti-Zionist banner since, with a claimed range of 700km, the missile could not strike any part of Israel from any location in Iran. The Iranian Ministry of Defense would later on release a video of its testing.

On 17 June 2017 Iran launched six Zolfaghar missiles into Syria towards the Deir ez-Zor region on ISIS targets as a response to the attack in Tehran on 8 June 2017. Sources sharply disagree about the accuracy and reliability of the Zolfaghar missiles used in this strike.

Zolfaghar missiles were also used along with Qiam missiles in a strike on Islamic State in Kermanshah, Syria on 1 October 2018.

On 7 March 2021, Yemeni Houthi attacked different locations in Saudi Arabia with ballistic missiles and armed drones with a Zolfaghar ballistic missile along with several Samad-3 loitering munitions targeted the Aramco oil facilities at Ras Tanura.

Fateh-110 and Zolfaghar missiles are believed to undergo final assembly in the Kuh-e Barjamali site, which is part of Iran's Khojir Aerospace Complex southeast of Tehran. The site was bombed by the US on 7 March 2026.

== Operators ==
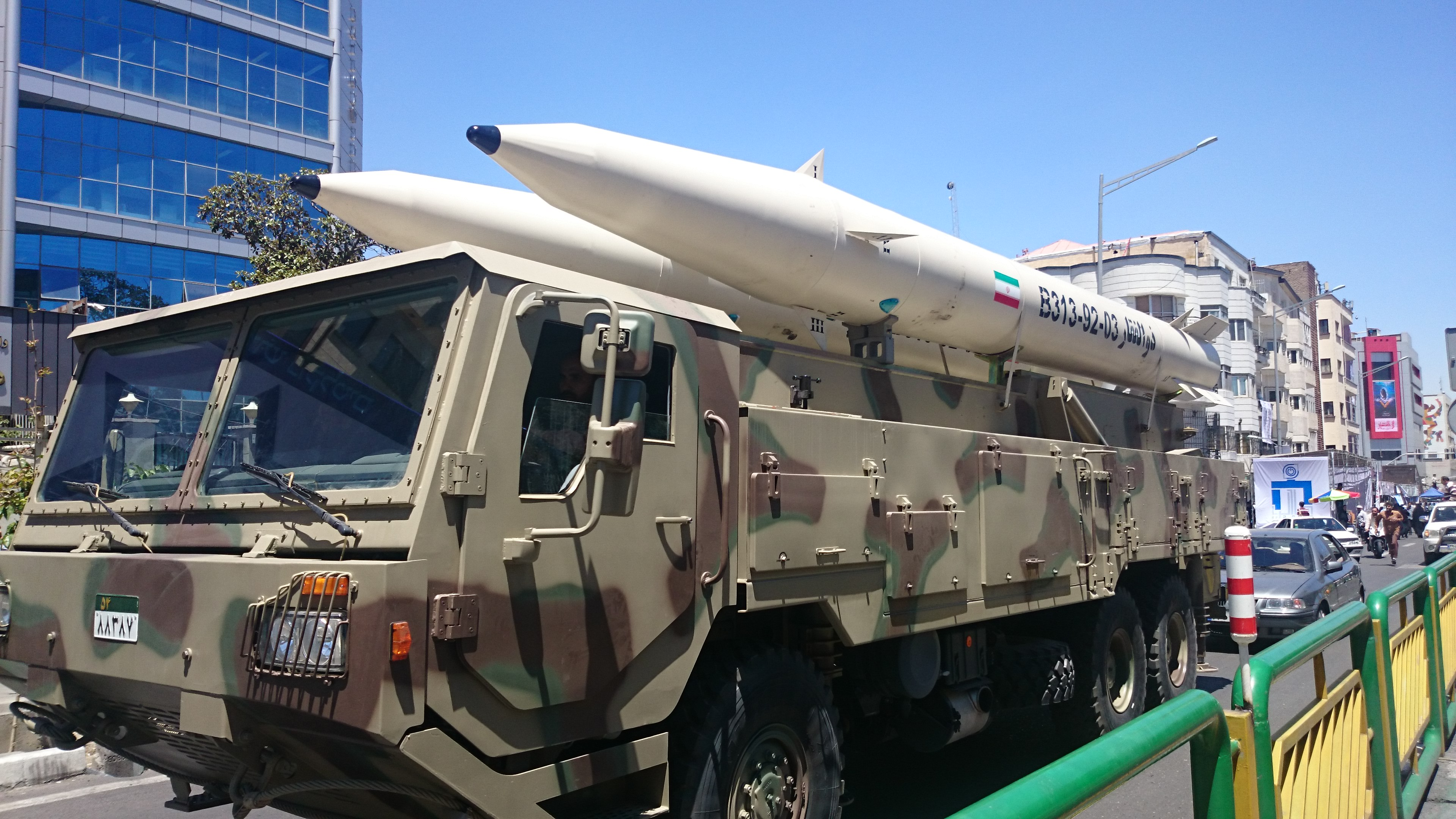
Zolfaqar missiles on a Truck

=== State-operators ===
- Iran

=== Reported future operators ===
- Russia – An intelligence assessment shared in October 2022 with Ukrainian and U.S. officials contended that Iran's armaments industry was preparing a first shipment of Fateh-110 and Zolfaghar missiles to Russia. Western media reported the sale was confirmed by the Iranian side later in October. Iran rejected the Western "media hype" over the delivery of Iranian missiles to Russia. The foreign minister said that "what they have said about the missiles is completely wrong." As of April 2024 no missile sales have occurred.

== See also ==
- Ballistic missile program of Iran
- Fateh-110
- Fateh-313
- Dezful (missile)
- List of military equipment manufactured in Iran
- Science and technology in Iran
