= Operation Martyr Soleimani =

2020 Iranian military operation in Iraq

- Part of the aftermath of the assassination of Qasem Soleimani
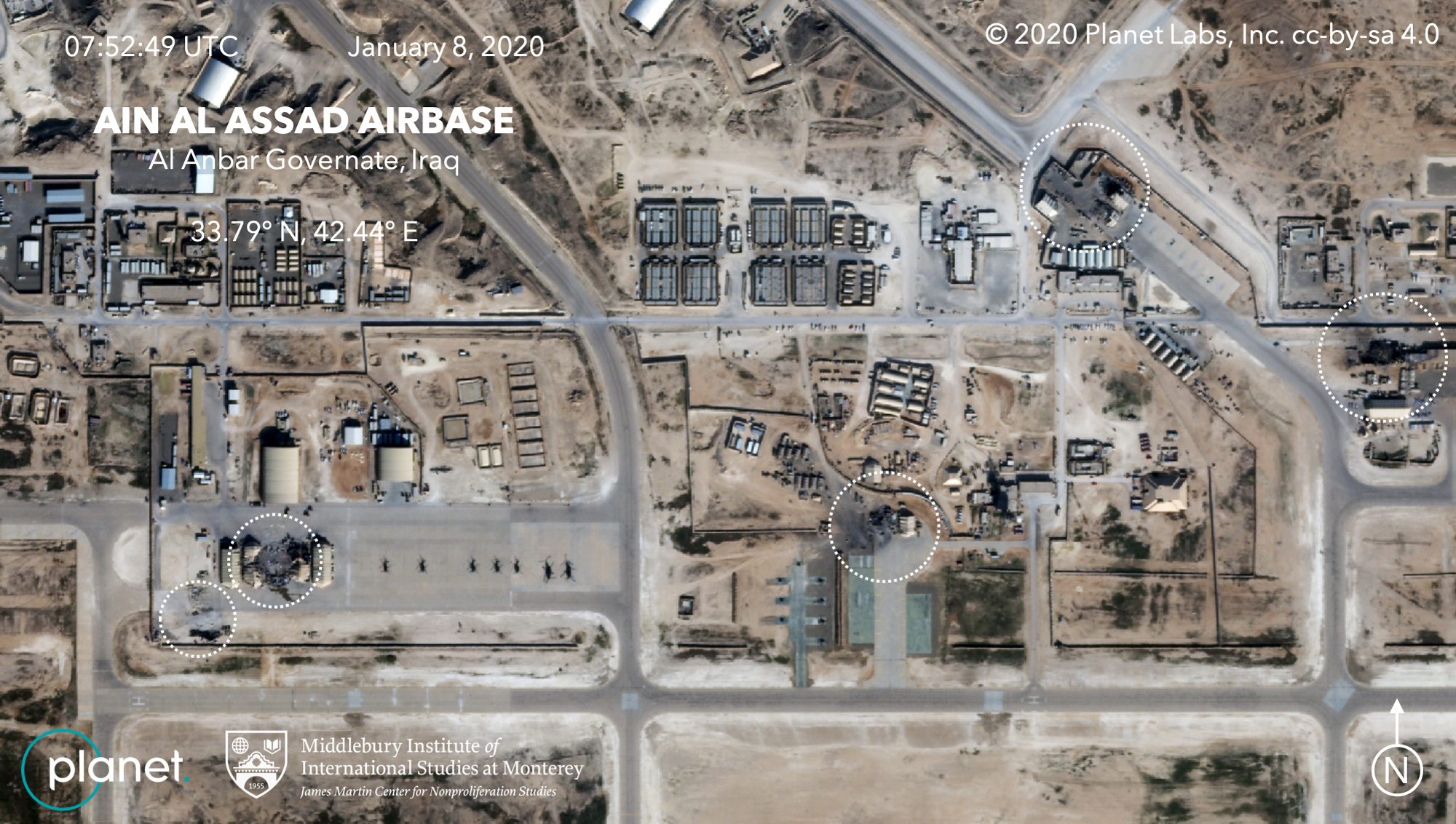
- Damage (circled) to at least five structures at Ayn al-Asad airbase in a series of missile attacks by Iran
- Operational scope: Military strike targeting multiple sites
- Locations: Al-Asad Airbase, Al Anbar Governorate, Iraq; 33°48′N 42°26′E; Erbil International Airport, Erbil, Iraq; 36.2375°N 43.963056°E
- Planned by: Iran
- Commanded by: Majid Mousavi
- Target: Al-Asad Airbase; Erbil Airbase
- Date: 8 January 2020, from about 1:30 a.m. to 4:00 a.m. (UTC+03:00)
- Executed by: Islamic Revolutionary Guard Corps: Islamic Revolutionary Guard Corps Aerospace Force
- Outcome: 11 Qiam 1 missiles hit Al-Asad Airbase
- Casualties: (United States) 110 U.S. military personnel wounded (mild traumatic brain injuries)
- Location of the targets hit

On 8 January 2020, Iran's Islamic Revolutionary Guard Corps (IRGC) conducted Operation Martyr Soleimani (Persian: عملیات شهید سلیمانی), launching over 12 ballistic missiles against the United States Armed Forces at al-Asad Airbase in Al Anbar Governorate, Iraq, as well as another airbase in Erbil, in response to the assassination of Major General Qasem Soleimani by a U.S. drone strike.

The strike was the largest ballistic missile attack ever against U.S. forces abroad. Initially, the U.S. was not willing to concede the seriousness of the attack. While it initially assessed that none of its service members were injured or killed, the U.S. Department of Defense ultimately said that 110 service members had been diagnosed and treated for traumatic brain injuries (mainly concussions) from the attack. Some of them were later awarded the Purple Heart.

Iran reportedly informed the Iraqi government of an imminent attack shortly beforehand. The United States secretary of state Mike Pompeo said the attack was intended to kill, however some analysts suggested the strike was deliberately designed to avoid causing any fatalities in order to dissuade an armed American response. The U.S. said it was able to avoid fatalities because the United States Space Force provided early warning.

In the months following the attack, the U.S. deployed Patriot and other missile defense systems to some of their Iraqi bases. Additionally, the high alert of Iranian forces after the attack may have caused the Ukraine International Airlines Flight 752 shootdown.

== Background ==
According to the U.S. Defense Intelligence Agency, in 2021 Iran had "the largest and most diverse ballistic arsenal in the Middle East, and a substantial inventory of close-range ballistic missiles, short-range ballistic missiles, and medium-range ballistic missiles that can strike targets throughout the region up to 2,000 kilometers (1243 miles) from Iran's borders".

In the lead up to the attacks, Iranian officials had said Iran would retaliate against U.S. forces for the killing of General Qasem Soleimani in Baghdad on 3 January 2020. U.S. president Donald Trump warned that any retaliation would result in the targeting of 52 significant Iranian sites, including cultural ones, by U.S. forces. Reportedly, following the Baghdad strike, U.S. intelligence agencies detected Iran's heightened readiness but it was unclear at the time if they were defensive measures or an indication of a future attack on U.S. forces.

Al-Asad Airbase, located in Al Anbar Governorate, western Iraq, hosted between 1,500 and 2,000 U.S. troops. On 3 December 2019, an Iraqi military statement said five rockets had landed on al-Asad airbase, with no injuries. Later, a "security source" inside al-Asad airbase and a "local official at a nearby town" told Reuters that reports that the airbase was under attack at that time were false. These reports on Twitter temporarily caused a rally of U.S. and Brent crude oil futures.

On 4 January 2020, two rockets hit the Balad Air Base located near Baghdad. Two mortars also hit Baghdad's Green Zone. These attacks resulted in no casualties or damage.

=== Thirteen revenge scenarios ===
The Thirteen revenge scenarios document was written by Iran's Supreme National Security Council in the wake of the death of Quds force commander Qasem Soleimani by US airstrike on 3 January 2020. It was announced by Secretary Ali Shamkhani on 7 January 2020 as a form a tribute to a departed comrade-in-arms whose final funeral was in his birthplace Kerman. Shamkhani warned that the scenarios would "bring a historic nightmare for America."

The document was created as a result of the threat by Ayatollah Khamenei of "hard revenge" loosed mayhem in the political corridors of Iran. In fact, The New York Times reported on 6 January that Khamenei "personally weighed in on how Iran should respond - insisting Iran directly retaliate for the killing". At least 13 scenarios for revenge have been discussed in SNSC meetings. Said Shamkhani to the Fars News Agency:

If all Council members agree even on the weakest scenario, it will bring a historic nightmare for America... [It will] not be just one single operation... The U.S. knows they are vulnerable to Iran's reaction. That's why a number of their patrols have reduced and forces are mainly concentrated at bases... The response is likely to be triggered by medium-range and long-range missiles... If the forces want to take shelter in the bases, we will destroy the bases in addition to the forces... If American forces do not leave our region on their foot and vertically, we will do something that their dead bodies go horizontally.

Shamkhani was aware of 19 US military bases "in the region", including 11 bases located east or west of the Iranian border, and eight north or south of the Iranian border.

== Attacks ==
On 8 January 2020, shortly after midnight, Iraqi prime minister Adil Abdul-Mahdi reportedly received a message from Iran indicating that the response to General Soleimani's death had "started or was about to start". Exact locations were not disclosed, but U.S. officials later confirmed their troops had adequate advanced warning of the attack and had taken shelter. Amir Ali Hajizadeh, the commander of the Islamic Revolutionary Guard Corps Aerospace Force, later clarified that half an hour before the missiles were fired, Iran informed the Iraqi Prime Minister that they would strike a base in Iraq without saying which base was the target. Hajizadeh said the Iranians gave forewarning to the Iraqi government out of "respect".

Sometime between 1:20 a.m. and 1:35 a.m. local, Iran began launching multiple ballistic missiles at select Iraqi bases hosting U.S. forces. According to Iranian media, the attack began around the same time of day Soleimani was killed five days prior, and just a few hours before his burial. The code used to launch the missiles was reportedly "Oh Zahra", referring to the daughter of the Islamic prophet Muhammad. According to U.S. troops at Al-Asad, the first missiles landed at 1:34 a.m. and were followed by three more volleys, spaced out by more than 15 minutes each. The attack lasted roughly three hours and was over by 4:00 a.m.

The Islamic Revolutionary Guard Corps (IRGC) took responsibility for the attack against the al-Asad Airbase about half an hour after the attack began and announced that it was carried out in response to the killing of Soleimani. The IRGC added that if the U.S. retaliated, they would respond in kind. It also declared that the attack was intended as a warning that applied to any regional actor that provides basing for U.S. military personnel. The Fars News Agency subsequently released video of the missile launches.

The Pentagon confirmed that both the al-Asad airbase and an airbase in Erbil, built by the South Korean Zaytun Division in 2004 during the Iraq War, were hit by Iranian surface-to-surface missiles. According to a U.S. military spokesman for United States Central Command (CENTCOM), the attacks unfolded in two waves, each about an hour apart. Marine General Kenneth McKenzie, commander of Central Command, monitored the attack from his headquarters in Tampa, Florida and communicated with Secretary of Defense Mark Esper and President Donald Trump.

U.S. drone footage of the Al Asad Airbase missile barrage

The exact number of missiles launched is disputed. A spokesman for U.S. Central Command said fifteen missiles were fired; ten hit the Al-Asad airbase, one hit the Erbil base, and four failed to reach their targets. U.S. defense secretary Mark Esper later gave a similar estimate, saying 16 short-range missiles had been launched from three locations within Iran, with 11 striking al-Asad (instead of the prior estimate of 10). Kurdish security officials told CNN that at least two targeted Erbil: one hit Erbil International Airport and did not explode, the other landed about 20 miles west of Erbil. According to the Iraqi military, 22 missiles were fired between 1:45 a.m. and 2:15 a.m. local, 17 toward Al-Asad base and 5 at Erbil. In an initial report, the Iranian Students News Agency (ISNA) said Iran launched "tens" of missiles. The day after the strike, IRGC aerospace commander Amir Hajizadeh stated that they fired a total of 13 missiles and that they targeted the Al-Asad airbase.

Tasnim News Agency reported that the IRGC used Fateh-313 and Qiam ballistic missiles in the attack and wrote that U.S. forces failed to intercept them because they were equipped with cluster warheads. Fox News reported that no missiles were intercepted because the bases lacked a missile defense system. According to U.S. defense secretary Mark Esper, the missiles carried between 1,000-and-2,000-pound (450 and 910 kg) warheads.

According to CBS, the attack was the largest ballistic missile strike against American forces in history.

=== Damage ===
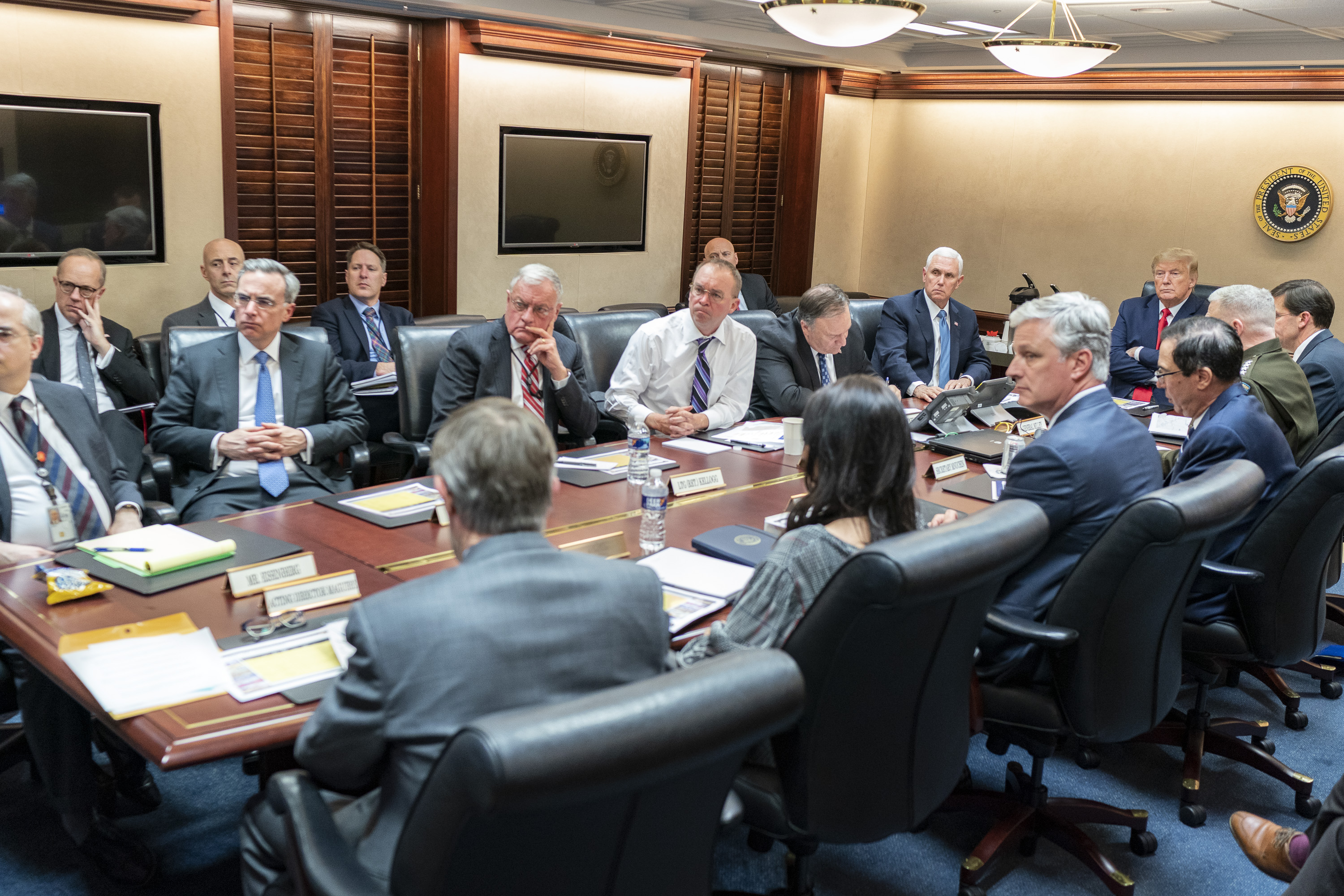
U.S. president Donald Trump and senior advisors meet in the White House Situation Room to assess the missile attacks, 7 January 2020 (EST).

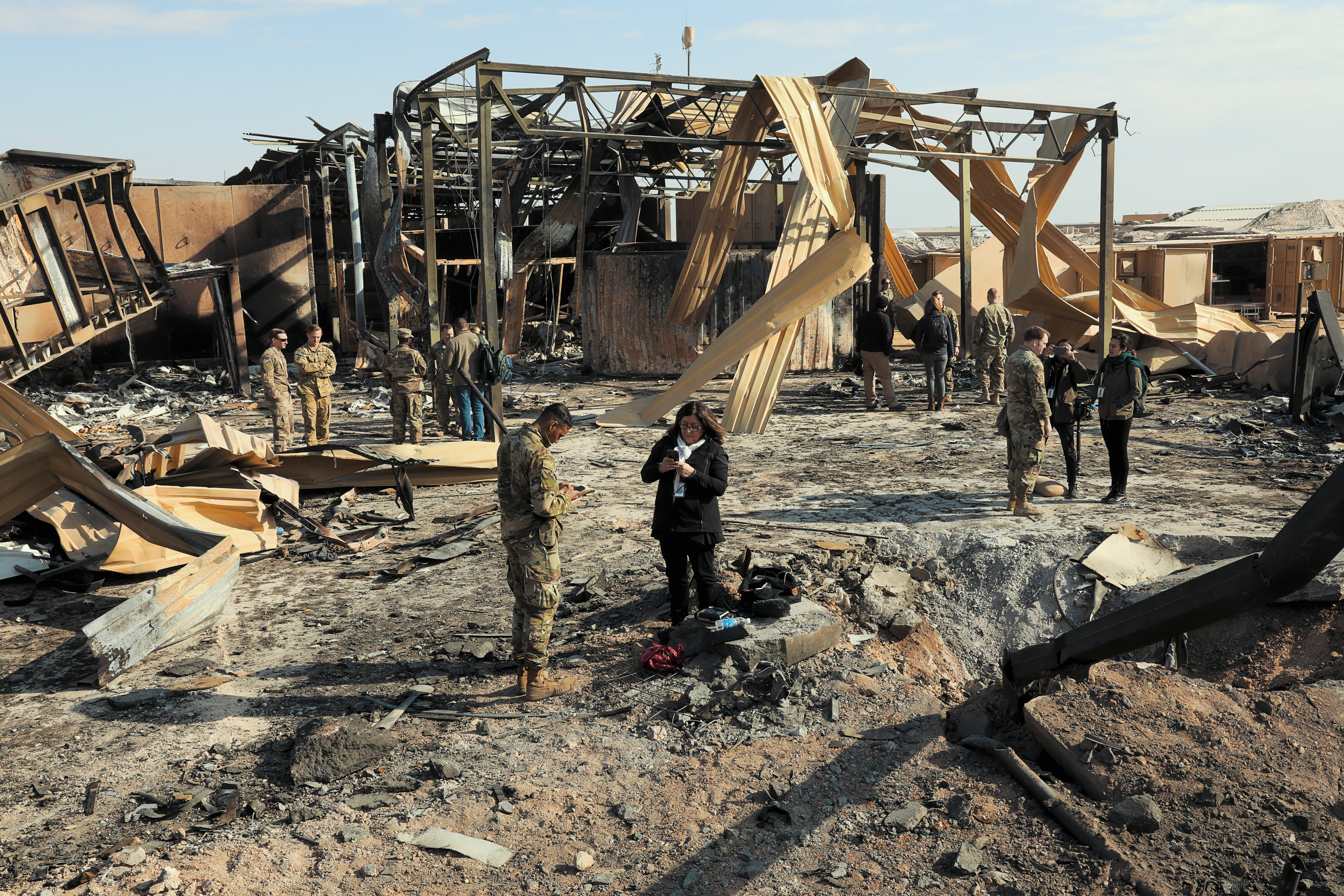
Aftermath of the missile attacks on Al Asad Airbase, 13 January 2020

The U.S. military initially assessed that there were no casualties, which was later echoed by the president. President Trump stated that the damage sustained was minimal. The U.S. defense secretary said the damage was limited to "tentage, taxiways, the parking lot, damaged helicopter, things like that, nothing I would describe as major". Some soldiers lamented losing all their personal belongings—clothing, books, pictures of their families, and mementos they had carried through more than a decade in the military.

Senior Iraqi officials said there were no Iraqi casualties. Among the coalition forces present in the two bases, Australia, Canada, Denmark, Finland, Lithuania, Norway, and Poland confirmed that their personnel were unharmed. OPEC's secretary-general Mohammed Barkindo, while on conference in Abu Dhabi, announced that Iraqi oil facilities were secure.

While damage assessments were still underway, Iranian state-run Mehr News Agency wrote "over 80 American troops were killed and some 200 wounded", citing an unidentified IRGC source. Later, a hoax Pentagon memo claiming 139 American troops were killed was spread on social media. Mike Pregent, a former U.S. intelligence officer, attributed the forged memo to an IRGC disinformation attempt.

According to The Military Times, a U.S. commando said Al Asad Airbase suffered the brunt of the missile barrage. Satellite photos provided by Planet Labs showed extensive damage to the base, with at least five structures damaged in the attack, showing that the missiles were precise enough to hit individual buildings. David Schmerler, an analyst with the Middlebury Institute of International Studies at Monterey, which evaluated the photos, said the attacks seemed to have hit buildings that stored aircraft, while buildings used for housing staff were not hit. Two U.S. defense officials told Newsweek that eighteen missiles, which used on-board guidance systems, landed in al-Asad airbase, three of them on the runway, while another hit and damaged an air control tower. One Black Hawk helicopter was destroyed, ten tents were "destroyed", and an MQ-1 Predator drone was alleged to have been damaged, although al-Asad hosts only U.S. Air Force MQ-9 Reapers and Army MQ-1C Gray Eagles, as MQ-1 Predators were phased out from USAF service in March 2018. Damaged structures also reportedly included a special forces compound, and two hangars, in addition to the U.S. drone operators' housing unit. Craters up to 30 feet (10 m) wide were left by the impacts.

U.S. soldiers stationed at al-Asad later confirmed that they had received advanced warning of the missile attack before the Iraqis notified them, and that by 11:00 p.m. (local), several hours before the first missiles landed, most of the American section of the base was in lockdown while other troops had been flown out. Only essential personnel such as tower guards and drone pilots remained unsheltered as they were protecting against a ground assault which base commanders expected would follow the missile attack. The base did not have structures in place to defend against a missile attack of the kind launched by the IRGC, with many taking cover in concrete indirect fire bunkers designed to withstand only 60 pound warheads and pyramid-like hardened aircraft shelters that were built during the Iran–Iraq War. Troops re-emerged from their shelters at the break of dawn. During the attack, the U.S. Army was flying seven UAVs, including MQ-1C Gray Eagles, across Iraq to monitor bases with U.S. troops. Fires caused by the attack on Al Asad burned through fiber-optic cables at the base, causing the 14 UAV pilots there to lose contact with the drones, rendering them unable to locate the drones and monitor the ongoing attack. After the attack, soldiers had to replace 500 meters of melted fiber cables which connected to radios which then connected to aircraft. US forces had to reprogram satellites in order to reconnect to the unaccounted-for drones, subsequently having to land them one-by-one at the damaged airbase until finishing around 9:00 a.m.

Several European and U.S. government officials believed that Iran deliberately avoided inflicting fatalities in their operation in order to send a message of resolve to avenge Soleimani without provoking a substantial military response. However, Pentagon officials said they believed the missiles were intended to kill Americans. Chairman of the Joint Chiefs of Staff Mark Milley believed the missiles were intended to cause structural damage, to destroy vehicles, equipment, and aircraft, and to kill personnel, adding that defensive measures by U.S. troops and early warning systems were what prevented personnel from being killed. According to the Center For Strategic & International Studies, the Space-based Infrared System (SBIRS) warned troops to prepare for incoming attacks, although the Pentagon did not confirm the presence of any missile defense systems at either al-Asad airbase or the base near Erbil. Lieutenant general David D. Thompson, vice commander of the United States Space Force, later said on 27 February that the warning messages sent to al-Asad base from Buckley Space Force Base had prevented U.S. fatalities. Lieutenant Colonel Tim Garland, commander of 1st Battalion, 5th Infantry Regiment, 1st Stryker Brigade Combat Team at al-Asad base, said the missile volleys were timed in such a way as to trick soldiers into thinking the bombardment was over. IRGC aerospace commander Amir Hajizadeh said the intention was not to kill any American troops but that they could have planned the operation to do so and stated that Iran launched cyber attacks that disabled U.S. missile tracking systems during the strikes would have been an option. He added that driving out U.S. forces from the region was the only fitting revenge for the killing of General Soleimani.

CBS's 60 Minutes, which had interviewed U.S. troops stationed at Al Asad Airbase, revealed on 28 February 2021 that more than 50 aircraft and 1,000 troops were evacuated before the missiles hit. According to CENTCOM commander Gen. Frank McKenzie, the Iranians monitored al-Asad by purchasing commercial satellite imaging and the evacuation was timed as to make sure the Iranians were using outdated spy photos, which played a part in why some U.S. officials believed the attack was intended to kill. The report also highlighted the conditions of troops on the ground, reporting that at one point 40 personnel were attempting to stuff themselves into a bunker which was made to house about 10 people. Army Major Alan Johnson noted that the impacts "knocked the wind out of me followed by the most putrid tasting ammonia tasting dust that swept through the bunker coated your teeth" and the "fire was just rolling over the bunkers, you know, like 70 feet in the air." People were "throwing up, everybody had headaches" after the attack, he added.

=== Injuries ===
On 17 January, over a week after the attack, several U.S. defense officials confirmed that "out of an abundance of caution" eleven U.S. troops were medically evacuated to military hospitals—three to Camp Arifjan in Ahmad al-Jaber Air Base, Kuwait and eight to Landstuhl Regional Medical Center in Landstuhl, Germany—to be treated for traumatic brain injury and to undergo further evaluations. The first service member was flown out of Iraq on 10 January, while others were evacuated on 15 January. Another official said that it was standard procedure for all personnel in the vicinity of a blast to be screened for TBI.

Initial U.S. assessments stated that there were no casualties, due to the Pentagon's longstanding treatment of brain injuries as a different class of wounds that do not require them to be regarded as "casualties".

On 24 January a Pentagon spokesman said that 34 service members were suffering headaches from the attack. 18 of them were evacuated to Landstuhl Regional Medical Center in Germany, eight of those were subsequently sent to the U.S. for treatment at Walter Reed National Military Medical Center. Another was evacuated to Kuwait. 16 service members were treated inside Iraq and had returned to duty soon after.

On 28 January, according to several Pentagon officials, around "200 people who were in the blast zone at the time of the attack have been screened for symptoms." As a result, no more than "50 U.S. service members have been diagnosed with TBI." It was said that the number of diagnosed may change, as the new information was that 31 of them had been treated in Iraq, while 18 (up from the previous figure of 17) were treated in Germany. The Pentagon said that all were diagnosed with mild traumatic brain injury and 77 had already returned to duty.

In November 2021, one of the recipients of the Purple Heart, 22-year-old Jason Quitugua, committed suicide as a result of vision and hearing problems and constant headaches and memory loss caused by the TBI inflicted in the attacks.

== Aftermath ==
=== U.S. response ===
President Donald Trump addresses the nation, White House, 8 January 2020.

In his first public comments on the attack, at 8:45 pm EST on 7 January, President Donald Trump tweeted "All is well!", said that damage assessments were ongoing, and added that he would make a statement on the attack the following morning. In his televised White House statement on 8 January, while being flanked by the Joint Chiefs of Staff, Trump sought to reduce tensions by downplaying the impact of the missile attacks, observing that Iran appeared to be "standing down", and ruling out a direct military response. Furthermore, Trump said he was willing to "embrace peace" and urged greater international cooperation in the region, suggesting it is possible for Iran and the U.S. to fight against a common enemy such as the Islamic State of Iraq and the Levant terrorist organization. However, there were no suggestions that his administration's "maximum pressure campaign" would relent, with his announcement of new sanctions on Iran and affirmation that they would never be allowed to possess nuclear weapons while he was in office.

In a letter to the United Nations, the U.S. wrote that it is braced to take further necessary action in the Middle East to ensure safety of U.S. personnel, and it is also ready to "engage in serious negotiations with Iran without preconditions" to avert war.

U.S. secretary of the treasury Steve Mnuchin announces sanctions on Iran's metal industries, 10 January 2020.

On 10 January, the Trump administration imposed new economic sanctions on Iran that targeted the country's metals industry, including the construction, manufacturing, textiles and mining economic sectors. U.S. treasury secretary Steven Mnuchin noted that the sanctions on metals and other industries would be both primary and secondary sanctions that allows the U.S. to designate other sectors in the future. Additionally, the U.S. announced 17 specific sanctions against Iran's largest copper, steel, aluminum, and iron manufacturers, a network of Chinese and Seychelles-based entities, and a vessel involved in the transfer of metal products. The administration also sanctioned eight senior Iranian officials who were involved in the missile attacks, including the secretary of Iran's Supreme National Security Council Ali Shamkhani, the deputy chief of staff of the Iranian armed forces Mohammad-Reza Ashtiani Araghi, and IRGC senior officer Gholamreza Soleimani.

By 13 April, the U.S. had installed and activated Patriot air defense systems which have anti-ballistic missile capabilities, an Army C-RAM system, and an AN/TWQ-1 Avenger at Al Asad Airbase and the base at Erbil, and at Camp Taji, after gradually moving the systems into Iraq since the attack.

=== Ukraine International Airlines Flight 752 shootdown ===
Shortly after the attacks, the U.S. Federal Aviation Administration issued a notice to airmen (NOTAM) prohibiting U.S. civil aviation operators from operating in the airspace over Iraq, Iran, and the waters of the Persian Gulf and the Gulf of Oman. Singapore Airlines and Qantas diverted their flights from Iranian airspace following the attacks.

Hours following the initial missile attacks on Iraq, and after the U.S. Federal Aviation Administration announced the NOTAM for the region, a Boeing 737-800 crashed shortly after takeoff from Tehran Imam Khomeini International Airport, killing all 176 passengers on board, including at least 130 Iranians. Iranian officials initially said that technical failures unrelated to the missile attacks caused the plane to crash. However, they drew skepticism when they refused to allow Boeing or U.S. aviation officials access to the black boxes.

On 11 January, after The New York Times obtained and published video showing the moment the aircraft was hit by an Iranian missile, the Iranian government admitted that the shootdown was due to human error, stating that the military mistook the plane for a "hostile target". A wave of anti-government protests emerged across Iran in response to the attempted cover-up, with some protesters demanding the Supreme Leader resign. President Trump tweeted support for the protesters in English and in Farsi. British ambassador to Iran Robert Macaire was arrested and held in custody for more than an hour after attending a gathering at Tehran's Amirkabir University of Technology. According to Tasnim News Agency, he was arrested for "suspicion of organising, provoking and directing radical actions". UK foreign secretary Dominic Raab called the ambassador's arrest "a flagrant violation of international law".

== Reactions ==
=== Iran ===
In a letter to the United Nations, Iran called the missile strikes a "measured and proportionate" act of "self-defense" that "was precise and targeted military objectives thus leaving no collateral damage to civilians and civilian assets in the area." IRGC aerospace commander Amir Hajizadeh later stated that, if the U.S. had retaliated militarily, Iran was prepared to fire thousands of missiles during the escalation.

Iran's foreign minister Mohammad Javad Zarif defended the legality of the attack, tweeting "Iran took & concluded proportionate measures in self-defense under Article 51 of UN Charter targeting base from which cowardly armed attack against our citizens & senior officials were launched." Zarif also tweeted "We do not seek escalation or war, but will defend ourselves against any aggression." He later said "it is up to the United States to now come to its senses and stop its adventurism in this region".

On 8 January, Ali Khamenei, the Supreme Leader of Iran, said military actions are not enough and that the "corruptive presence" of the U.S. in the Middle East must be ended. Khamenei also described the attacks as a "slap in the face" to the U.S. Khamenei later reiterated this during a Friday sermon on 17 January, describing the attack as showing that "Iran has the power to give such a slap to a world power shows the hand of God".

President Hassan Rouhani said "real revenge and the ultimate response by regional nations is when America is expelled from this region and its hand of aggression is cut off forever."

Iran's ambassador to the UN, Majid Takht-Ravanchi, said on 10 January that Iran intended to "send a message" with the missile strike.

=== Iraq ===
Iraqi Prime Minister Adil Abdul-Mahdi called for de-escalation and respect of Iraq's sovereignty.

Shortly after U.S. President Donald Trump's de-escalatory remarks regarding the attack, Iraqi cleric Muqtada al-Sadr urged his followers not to conduct any attacks against U.S. elements in Iraq. Sayyid Ali al-Sistani also called for ceasefire on both sides, saying the conflict violated Iraqi sovereignty.

Despite the calls for de-escalation, Reuters reported that three Katyusha rockets were launched on the evening of 8 January in Baghdad by unidentified militants, hitting the Green Zone. On 12 January, at least four Iraqi soldiers were injured after seven mortars attacked an airbase in Baghdad that housed U.S. trainers.

=== United States ===
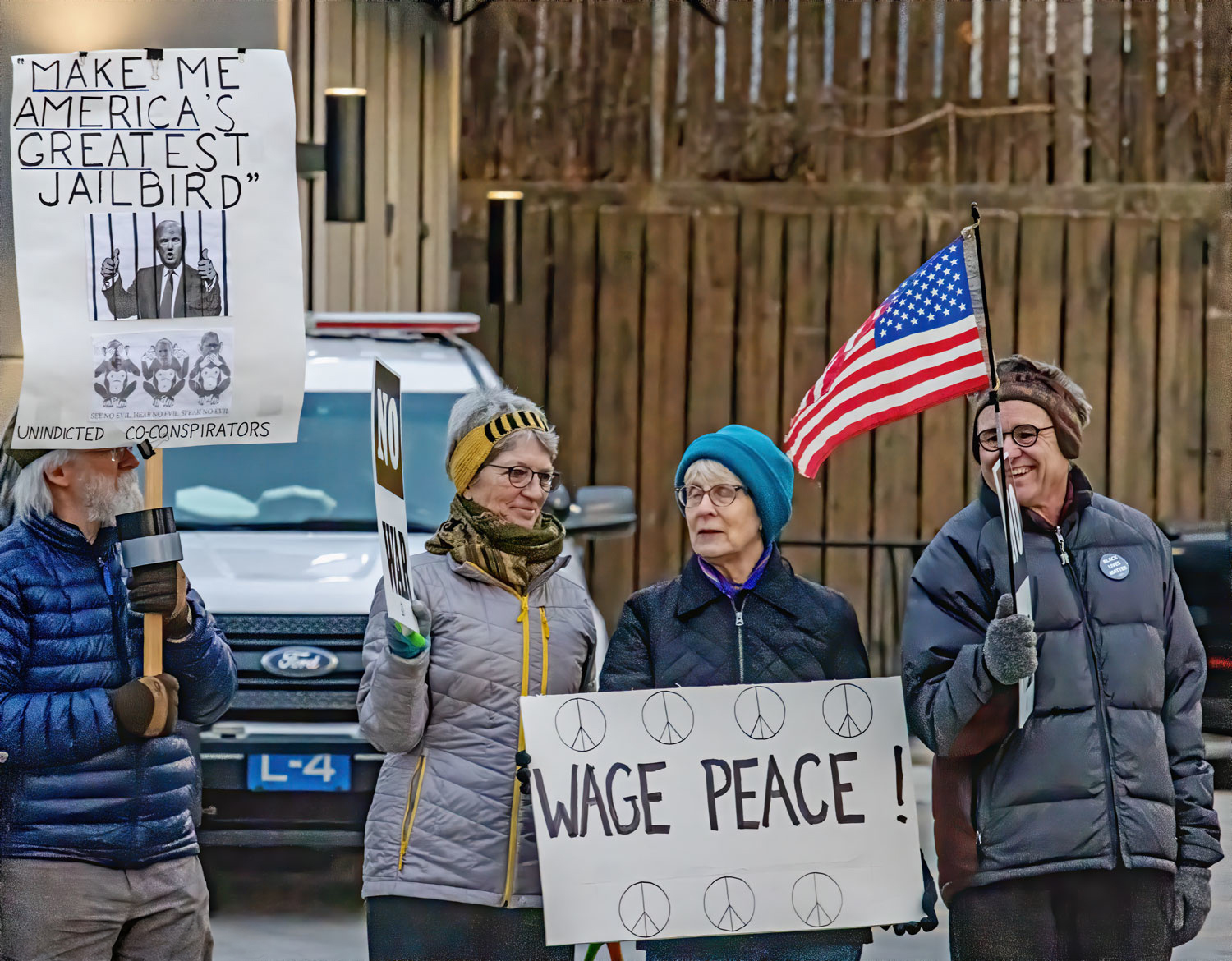
Anti-war protesters in Columbus, Ohio, 9 January 2020

U.S. Secretary of State Mike Pompeo condemned the Iranian ballistic missile strike.

Both Democratic and Republican members of the Senate advised the Trump administration to deescalate its stance with Iran. Senate majority leader Mitch McConnell said, "I believe the President wants to avoid conflict or needless loss of life but he's rightly prepared to protect American lives and interests and I hope Iran's leaders do not miscalculate by questioning our collective will in launching further attacks." House Speaker Nancy Pelosi announced a vote on a war powers resolution that would limit President Trump's military actions regarding Iran.

Senator Lindsey Graham called the missile strike "an act of war" and threatened to take Iran "out of the oil business".

In May 2020, 29 U.S. soldiers injured in the attack were awarded the Purple Heart. In December 2021, 39 additional soldiers were awarded the Purple Heart.

=== International ===
- United Nations's Secretary-General Antonio Guterres appealed for de-escalation and peace.
- European Union leaders urged President Trump, both in public and in private, not to give a military response.
- United Kingdom: British prime minister Boris Johnson denounced the missile attacks on U.S. forces, urging Iran to avoid further "reckless and dangerous" strikes.
- Saudi Arabia's deputy defense minister Prince Khalid bin Salman said the kingdom would stand with Iraq and do everything in its power to spare it from the "danger of war and conflict between external parties".
- Turkey's president Recep Tayyip Erdoğan said during the inauguration of the TurkStream gas pipeline alongside Russian president Vladimir Putin, that "no one has the right to throw the whole region, especially Iraq, into a new ring of fire for the sake of their own interests." He added "the tension between our ally U.S.A. and our neighbor Iran has reached a point that we do not desire at all," while promoting Turkey's diplomatic efforts to defuse the crisis.
- Qatar's emir, Sheikh Tamim bin Hamad Al Thani, visited Tehran to discuss the crisis with Iranian president Hassan Rouhani. The Qatari leader said de-escalation and dialogue were the only means to resolve the crisis and maintain peace. Sheikh Tamim was the first national leader to visit Iran following the death of General Soleimani.

== See also ==
- 2021 Erbil rocket attacks
- 2020 Camp Taji attacks
- Withdrawal of United States troops from Iraq (2020–2021)
- 2020 in Iraq
- 2020 in Iran
