= Operation Night of Power =

2017 Iranian missile strike in Syria

- Part of the reactions to 2017 Tehran attacks and the Iranian involvement in the Syrian Civil War
- Operational scope: IRGC Aerospace Force fires a Zolfaghar missile towards targets in Deir ez-Zor Governorate
- Type: Missile strike
- Location: Deir ez-Zor Governorate, Syria; 35°1′6″N 40°27′12″E
- Commanded by: IRGC
- Target: ISIL in Syria
- Date: 18 June 2017
- Executed by: Islamic Revolutionary Guard Corps: Aerospace Force; Quds Force (intelligence gathering)
- Outcome: See Tactical analysis
- Casualties: 170+ (per IRGC) killed
- Location of the ISIL base hit by missiles

On 18 June 2017, under Operation Night of Power (Persian: عملیات شب قدر, romanized: Amaliat shab-e-qadar), Iran's Islamic Revolutionary Guard Corps (IRGC) fired six Zolfaghar surface-to-surface mid-range ballistic missile from domestic bases targeting ISIL forces in the Syrian Deir ez-Zor Governorate in response to the terrorist attacks in Tehran earlier that month.

Israeli, Iranian, and independent sources sharply disagree about the efficacy and results of the strike, including the accuracy and reliability of the missiles used.

== Background ==
On 7 June 2017, Islamic State terrorists committed the 2017 Tehran attacks on the Islamic Consultative Assembly (Iran's parliament) and the Mausoleum of Ruhollah Khomeini, killing 18 people, mostly civilians (excluding the attackers). ISIS claimed responsibility. The Iranian Islamic Revolutionary Guard Corps (IRGC) subsequently vowed retaliation for the attacks. Supreme Leader of Iran Seyed Ali Khamenei stated on his website that Iran would "slap its enemies" in connection with the Tehran attacks. Hours before the missile strike, Iranian Army's rapid response forces were deployed in the country's western border areas.

Some Iranian sources suggested that IRGC chose Dayr al-Zawr given that the area had begun to serve as the primary center of assembly, command, and logistics for ISIL militants lately, as they had been moving there after defeats in Aleppo and Mosul over the previous months.

== Missile strike ==
On 17 June 2017, Iran fired about a half dozen missiles from IRGC Aerospace Force bases in the Iranian provinces of Kermanshah and Kurdistan against ISIL sites in the Deir ez-Zor region in Syria. Most sources report six missiles fired, but some report other numbers. According to IRGC, the strike targeted ISIL "command centers, gatherings, logistic sites and factories of suicide car bombs". This became Iran's first combat use of ballistic missiles since the Iran–Iraq War. It is also the first time that the IRGC conducted a strike on ISIL from Iranian territory, according to The Guardian. The missiles were Zolfaghar missiles (upgraded Fateh-110 with a longer range and optional cluster munition warhead), with a range of 700 kilometres (430 mi). Iranian television showed footage of the missiles being launched into the night sky. According to an IRGC spokesman, the Zolfaghar missiles flew 650-700 km. IHS Jane's calculated the distance as slightly less at 600 km.

The day after the strike, the IRGC released footage that they said depicted the moments of the missiles hitting their targets. The videos were transmitted by drones that the IRGC flew from Damascus over Dayr al-Zour. Sources disagreed about the contents and best interpretation of the drone videos (see below).

According to Fars News, the IRGC later provided further details, saying the attack was coordinated with the General Staff of the Armed Forces and the Iranian Leader, who is the official commander-in-chief of the Iranian military. The attack was planned by IRGC Aerospace Force based on the intelligence provided by the Quds Force. According to IRGC general Ramazan Sharif, the attack was coordinated in advance with the Syrian government, and the missiles passed through Iraqi airspace to reach their targets.

== Analysis ==
=== Tactical ===
Israeli and Iranian sources sharply disagree about the efficacy and results of the strike, including factual details like the number of missiles launched. According to Israeli media, seven missiles were launched: three came down prematurely in Iraq, three landed in Syria but did not hit their targets, and one hit its intended target. According to Iran, six missiles were fired and all hit their targets. According to IHS Jane's, six missiles were launched: four failed to reach their targets and two hit empty fields in Mayadin. According to Foundation for Strategic Research, a French think tank, four of six missiles hit their targets.

Israeli Defense Forces Chief of Staff Gadi Eisenkot stated that the missiles "operational achievement was much smaller" than what has been reported and Iran obtained "far from precise hits." Israeli media claimed that three of the seven missiles Iran launched came down in Iraq without even making it to Syria, and only one of the seven landed on its intended target, an Islamic State base in Syria's mostly IS-held Deir Ezzor province. Another of the seven landed hundreds of yards away, in the city of Mayadin.

On June 24, Brigadier General, Amir Ali Hajizadeh, Commander of IRGC Aerospace Force responded to the claims by Israeli sources, reiterating that the missiles had all hit their targets, and what Israelis had witnessed falling into Iraq were the missiles trunks that were detached from the warheads as the missiles reached as close as 100 kilometers to the targets.

Israeli Defence Forces (IDF) Chief of Staff, Lieutenant General Gadi Eisenkot, has disputed the operation's impact, saying it was less significant than Iranian reports claim.

In an interview with BBC Persian, Farzin Nadimi, an independent military expert, stated that judging by the videos and satellite images, it looks like two unknown targets were nearly hit. Babak Taghvaie, an Iranian author and defence researcher in the same news agency reported that two missiles landed in the target area, one hit open land 150 meters off the specified target (the headquarters of ISIL regional command, in the building that was previously a school called Al-reshad), and the other hit a building next to its target (a telecommunication building), overall, the attack had little accuracy.

Iran Watch reports that seven missiles were fired, a mix of Zolfgahar and Qiam missiles, with no commentary on their effectiveness.

Syrian opposition activist Omar Abu Laila, who is based in Germany but closely follows events in his native Deir el-Zour, said two Iranian missiles fell near and inside Mayadin, an Islamic State stronghold. He said there were no casualties from the strikes.

Two weeks after the strikes, two French experts, Stéphane Delory and Can Kasapoglu, published an analysis for the leading French think tank Foundation for Strategic Research. They wrote that the released videos show 4 missiles hitting their targets.

Assessing the footage released by the IRGC, Janes disagreed, writing that it was taken from multiple angles and showed only two locations in Mayadin being hit, suggested four of the missiles failed to reach their targets. Janes also wrote that satellite images revealed that the two missiles that reached Mayadin landed in open areas.

=== Strategic and political ===
The Jerusalem Post claimed the strike is a warning aimed at the United States, Saudi Arabia but also Israel.

CNN military analyst, described Iran's move as a "real escalation. ... The selection of targets is interesting. They say they are firing at the same people who planned the attacks in Tehran, but it also bolsters the Syrian army effort right now." (see also Syrian Desert campaign (May–July 2017) and Siege of Deir ez-Zor (2014–17)) Amir Daftari, a CNN producer in Tehran, said that Iran hadn't hidden its support for Assad "but up until now they've led us to believe that they've provided things like military advisers, volunteers and money."

An analyst writing for The Huffington Post wrote that Iran just shifted its three decades-long policy of testing, but not using missiles, as a reaction to US President Donald Trump's escalation in the Middle East in three ways: 1) Needless increase in America's military involvement in the Syrian proxy war which signaled US intention to dominate Syria, a long-time Iran ally. Iran's missile strikes were in part to send a message: "We will not allow Syria to leave our orbit for yours." 2) Giving Saudi Arabia and other traditional US allies in the region a blank check on Middle East security, thereby emboldening them to pursue reckless policies vis-à-vis Iran demonstrated by Saudis call for taking the regional fight inside Iran, not long before terrorists attacked the parliament and Khomeini's mausoleum in Tehran – allegedly with Saudi support. "A growing number of Iranian decision-makers no longer distinguish between Saudi and American aggression, precisely because the latter has blessed the efforts of the former" hence Iran sending a message that regardless of which party attacks them they are going to attack US and its allies' spheres of control in retaliation. 3) Trump's team has called for regime change in Iran, thereby eliminating the possibility of U.S.-Iran cooperation outside the nuclear deal. Thus, Tehran's missile strikes in Syria were a clear signal to Washington: "Pursuing regime change won’t be cost-free. We may not be able to win a war, but we can survive one."

== Official statements and reactions ==
=== Iranian ===
In a public statement related to the strikes, published by its Public Relations Office, the IRGC cautioned that the missile strikes were just a warning to deter any further action by the terrorists. It specifically read that the "IRGC warns the Takfiri terrorists and their regional and trans-regional supporters that they would be engulfed by its revolutionary wrath and flames of the fire of its revenge in case they repeat any such devilish and dirty move in future."

In a statement released by IRGC in connection with the strike, they warned terrorists and "their regional and trans-regional supporters" against any new terrorist attacks on Iran. They threatened to respond with greater intensity, should Iran's security be jeopardized by its enemies again.

IRGC spokesman Brigadier General Ramezan Sharif claimed: "Fortunately, all incoming reports and images of drones which were monitoring the operation suggest that the six medium-range powerful Iranian missiles have precisely hit the targets, the key bases of terrorists in the general area of Dayr al-Zawr inside Syria." Amir Ali Hajizadeh, commander of the IRGC's Aerospace Force, said the videos showed them that "the missiles precisely hit their targets."

Iranian state television quoted Gen. Ramazan Sharif as saying that "if they (IS) carry out a specific action to violate our security, there will definitely be more launches, with intensified strength. ... The Saudis and Americans are especially receivers of this message. ... Obviously and clearly, some reactionary countries of the region, especially Saudi Arabia, had announced that they are trying to bring insecurity into Iran." The same missiles can reach Saudi capital Riyadh, if fired from Iran.

On June 19, Bahram Qassemi, Iran's Foreign Ministry's spokesman, stated that the Sunday missile attack against Takfiri targets in Syria was "just a small slap" in the face of the terrorists and their patrons. The retaliation "was just a wake-up warning to those who still cannot or have not managed to decently comprehend the realities of the region and their own limits," he said, adding that "Iran does not take lightly the issue of defending its security and stability."

Ali Akbar Velayati, a senior adviser to the Leader of the Islamic Revolution, also said, "the world's most independent country will authoritatively respond to the ill-wishers, terrorists, and the enemies wherever they might be."

=== Syrian ===
Syrian Information Minister, Mohammad Ramez Tourjman said the IRGC missile strikes showed that Iran confronts threats to its existence at all levels, and they "deterred the US from even thinking of attacking Iran or isolating the country." He added the attacks signaled that Syria and the resistance front in Iran and Iraq are determined to uproot terrorism in all forms with all means in hand.

=== Israeli ===
Israeli Prime Minister Benjamin Netanyahu said "I have one message for Iran: Don't threaten Israel. ... We are watching their actions and watching their words". Israeli Defense Minister Avigdor Liberman reacted to the missile strikes by saying "Israel is not worried. Israel is prepared for every development. And we are prepared, we have no concerns or worries". Israeli Defense Forces Chief of Staff Gadi Eisenkot acknowledged that the missiles “made a statement” to the world about Iran's preparedness to use its ballistic missiles.

== See also ==
- 2018 Iraqi Kurdistan missile strike
- 2018 Eastern Euphrates missile strike
