= Wisconsin Project on Nuclear Arms Control =

- Founded: 1986
- Purpose: Non-proliferation
- Location: Washington, D.C.
- Region served: Global
- Method: Research, Advocacy
- Website: www.wisconsinproject.org

The Wisconsin Project on Nuclear Arms Control is a private, non-profit, non-partisan organization that, according to its website, "carries out research and public education designed to stop the spread of nuclear weapons, chemical/biological weapons and long-range missiles. It is a private, non-profit, non-partisan foundation that operates in Washington, D.C. under the auspices of the University of Wisconsin."

The organization was founded by Emeritus Professor Gary Milhollin, who led the Wisconsin Project for twenty-five years. Valerie Lincy now serves as executive director.

The Wisconsin Project receives funding through grants from the U.S. government and several private foundations, whose identities are undisclosed.

== Products ==
In 1995, the Wisconsin Project began publication of The Risk Report, which is now a subscription database used by governments and private companies to screen business transactions and verify the legitimacy of foreign buyers. Drawing from unclassified sources, The Risk Report contains up-to-date information on sensitive products and technologies, export regulations, and organizations and individuals linked to WMD proliferation. Matthew Godsey is editor of the Risk Report.

The Wisconsin Project also tracks WMD proliferation through its two watchdog web sites, Iraq Watch and Iran Watch. Created in 2002, Iraq Watch detailed key Iraqi entities involved in weapons proliferation, listed their foreign suppliers, and provided access to documents describing Iraq's past WMD-related activities. The site was last updated in August 2006. Iran Watch, launched in September 2004, follows the format of its successful predecessor, listing suspect Iranian organizations and sites and their foreign suppliers. The site also provides original analyses and external resources relating to Iran's WMD capabilities. Valerie Lincy is the editor and principal investigator for Iran Watch.

== History ==
In 1986, the Wisconsin Project revealed that Norway, because of a secret export of heavy water to Israel, had the right to inspect Israel's nuclear program. The revelation forced Israel to return half of the nuclear material to Norway and forced Norway to abandon its dangerous nuclear export business.

The Project's activism in the early 1990s drew attention to the proliferation threat posed by Iraq. In a series of publications, the Project argued that nuclear inspections in Iraq would fail unless they became more aggressive. The Project also argued for better export controls by exposing past sales of sensitive equipment by western firms to Iraqi builders of nuclear weapons, chemical weapons, and long-range missiles.

In 1998, the U.S. government used data from the Wisconsin Project to restrict U.S. trade with 63 organizations involved in the nuclear and missile programs of India and Pakistan, following those countries’ nuclear tests.

In 2000, the Wisconsin Project launched a public-private initiative to improve export controls in the former Soviet Union and Eastern Europe. The program was expanded in 2002 in cooperation with the Department of Defense, the Department of State, and the Customs Service. To date, nearly 800 export control officials have been trained in some 30 countries around the world.

In 2005, Professor Milhollin testified before the U.S.-China Economic and Security Review Commission that weaknesses in U.S. sanctions law were allowing companies helping to spread weapons of mass destruction to go unpunished. The Project's research was the basis for a November 2005 Senate bill that would have eliminated these loopholes and increased the severity of sanctions against companies that continued to proliferate to Iran.

In 2007, the Project supplied information on Iranian organizations linked to nuclear and missile work that contributed to decisions by the United Nations, the United States and the European Union to freeze the assets of several of these organizations. The Project also exposed the inadequacies of U.S. sanctions enforcement against Iran at the time.

In 2008, the Project published a report revealing that the U.S. Commerce Department was cutting controls on the sale of militarily useful American products to China. After the report was published, the Commerce Department suspended and then reduced its effort to cut the controls.

In 2009, the Project helped the New York County District Attorney's Office investigate sales from China to Iran of nuclear- and missile-usable technology that passed through New York banks. The Project testified on the commodities and firms involved before a grand jury in New York City that subsequently indicted the Chinese company that was making the sales.

In 2010, the Project published a report featured in the Wall Street Journal that described how Iran's national shipping company, blacklisted by the United States along with 123 of its vessels, was evading U.S. sanctions by giving its ships new names, new managers, and new “owners.” Following the Project's report, the U.S. Treasury Department blacklisted many of the ships' new names, along with their new owners and managers.

In 2011, the Project expanded the impact of its Risk Report database, with support from the U.S. State Department, by providing training to hundreds of export control officials in eleven countries, including Bulgaria, Croatia, the Czech Republic, Estonia, Hungary, Latvia, Lithuania, Macedonia, Mexico, Slovenia, and Ukraine.
