= Ahmed Rizk =

Syrian military officer

- أحمد رزق
- Born: Anadan, Aleppo Governorate, Syria
- Military career
- Allegiance: Syrian opposition (until 2024); Syrian National Army; Nour al-Din al-Zenki Movement; Syria (since 2025)
- Branch: Syrian Army
- Rank: Brigadier
- Unit: (Syria) 80th Division
- Conflicts: Syrian civil war; SDF–Syrian transitional government clashes (2025–present)

Ahmed Mohammed Rizk (Arabic: أحمد محمد رزق) is a Syrian military officer serving as commander of the 80th Division of the Syrian Army, following the fall of the Assad regime. He was previously the commander of the Nour al-Din al-Zenki Movement.

== Role during the Syrian civil war ==
He was the military commander of Nour al-Din al-Zenki Movement.

He played a key role in persuading groups from the National Front for Liberation to join Ahrar Olan, and also assisted in the Al-Shahba Gathering, which was close to Hay'at Tahrir al-Sham.

== Post-Assad era ==
On 29 December 2024, he was promoted to colonel, alongside other former opposition figures.

He was appointed the head of the 80th Division.
