= Ahrar Olan =

- Active regions: Aleppo Governorate, Syria
- Wars: the Syrian Civil War

Ahrar Olan is an ally of Hay'at Tahrir al-Sham that has been active during the Syrian civil war.

== History ==
Ahmed Rizk, who was allied with senior HTS figure Abu Maria al-Qahtani, persuaded members of the National Front for Liberation to defect and join the faction.

The group is considered the "pro-HTS faction" of the Ahrar al-Sham Eastern Sector.

The group was given partial control of al-Hamran crossing in Jarabulus, alongside the Al-Shahba Gathering, several months after clashes between Ahrar Olan and Ahrar al-Sham over control of the crossing.
