= Syrian Army =

Land force branch of the Syrian Armed Forces

Syrian Arab Army
- الجيش العربي السوري
- Founded: 1 August 1945; 2024 (current form)
- Country: Syria
- Type: Army
- Role: Land warfare
- Size: ~180,000–182,000
- Part of: Syrian Armed Forces
- Garrison/HQ: Damascus
- Motto: "Arabic: حُمَاةَ الديار" (Guardians of the Homeland)
- Colors: Service uniform: Khaki, Olive; Combat uniform: Green, Black, Khaki
- Anniversaries: August 1st
- Engagements: Levant Crisis; 1948 Arab–Israeli War; Reprisal operations; First Iraqi–Kurdish War; Six-Day War; War of Attrition; Black September; Yom Kippur War; Lebanese Civil War; Syrian Intervention; 1982 Lebanon War; Islamist uprising in Syria; Gulf War; Operation Grapes of Wrath; Syrian civil war; 2024 Syrian opposition offensives; Battle of Aleppo (2024); Operation Dawn of Freedom; 2024 Hama offensive; Deir ez-Zor offensive (2024); 2024 Homs offensive; Fall of Damascus; Aftermath of the Syrian civil war; Assadist insurgency; Western Syria clashes; March 2025 Western Syria clashes; March 2025 Daraa clashes; Druze insurgency; 2025 Jaramana clashes; Southern Syria clashes (April–May 2025); Southern Syria clashes (July–September 2025); SDF–Syrian transitional government clashes (2025–2026); Middle Eastern crisis (2023–present); Israeli invasion of Syria

Commanders
- Commander-in-Chief: President Ahmed al-Sharaa
- Minister of Defense: Murhaf Abu Qasra
- Chief of the General Staff: Ali Noureddine Al-Naasan

Insignia
- Ensign

The Syrian Arab Army (Note: Arabic: الجيش العربي السوري, romanized: al-Jaysh al-'Arabi as-Sūrī) is the land force branch of the Syrian Armed Forces. It originated in local military forces formed by the French after World War I, after France obtained a mandate over the region. It was officially formed in 1945, before Syria obtained full independence in 1946.

After 1946, it played a major role in Syria's governance, mounting six military coups: two in 1949, including the March 1949 Syrian coup d'état and the August 1949 coup by Colonel Sami al-Hinnawi, and one each in 1951, 1954, 1963, 1966, and 1970. It fought four wars with Israel (1948, the Six-Day War in 1967, the Yom Kippur War of 1973, and 1982 Lebanon War) and one with Jordan ("Black September" in Jordan, 1970). An armored division was also deployed to Saudi Arabia in 1990–91 during the Gulf War, but saw little action. From 1976 to 2005 it was the major pillar of the Syrian occupation of Lebanon. Internally, it played a major part in suppressing the 1979–82 Islamist uprising in Syria, and from 2011 to 2024 was heavily engaged in fighting the Syrian civil war, the most violent and prolonged war the Syrian Arab Army had taken part in since its establishment in the 1940s.

The Syrian Arab Army Command told soldiers and officers they were no longer in service as of 8 December 2024, with the fall of the Assad regime. As of December 2024, a new Syrian Arab Army led by ex-Hay'at Tahrir al-Sham forces began a process of reconstruction. On 25 August 2026, following negotiations for a unified military, the Syrian Democratic Forces (SDF) formally dissolved and integrated into the Syrian Armed Forces, contributing an estimated 10,000 to 12,000 active combatants and bringing total army strength to between 180,000 and 182,000 personnel.

== History ==
=== 1919–1945 ===
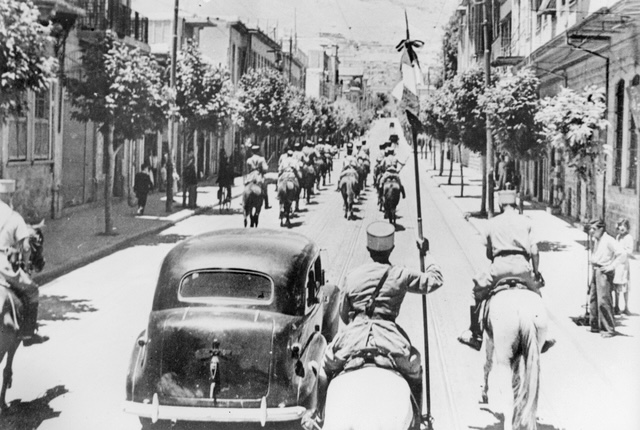
Allied forces escorted by Circassian cavalry of the Special Troops of the Levant (1941).

In 1919, the French formed the Special Troops of the Levant (French: Troupes spéciales du Levant) as part of the Army of the Levant in the French Mandate for Syria and the Lebanon. The former with 8,000 men later grew into both the Syrian and Lebanese armies. This force was used primarily as auxiliaries in support of French troops, and senior officer posts were held by Frenchmen, although Syrians were allowed to hold commissions below the rank of major. The Syrian officer corps of the Special Troops mainly consisted of former officers of the Ottoman Army and members of Syria's ethnic and religious minorities. By 1927, more than 35% of Syrian soldiers came from the auxiliary troops; they were traditionally Kurdish, Druze or Circassian. After the repression of the Great Syrian Revolt by General Maurice Gamelin, commander of the Special Troops, they were strengthened and became the main forces of the French apparatus.

In 1927, the force was augmented by North African infantry (tirailleurs) and cavalry (spahis), French Foreign Legion, Troupes de marine infantry and artillery units (both French and Senegalese). The whole force constituted the Army of the Levant.

=== 1945–1970 ===
In August 1945, the Syrian Army was formed mainly from the Army of the Levant. As Syria gained independence in 1946, its leaders envisioned a division-sized army. On June 19, 1947, the Syrian Army took the survivors of Pan Am Flight 121 to the Presbyterian mission hospital at Deir ez-Zor. The 1st Brigade was ready by the time of the Syrian war against Israel on May 15, 1948. It consisted of two infantry battalions and one armoured battalion. The 2nd Brigade was organized during the 1948 Arab–Israeli War and also included two infantry battalions and one armoured battalion.

At the time of the 1948 Arab–Israeli War, the army was small, poorly armed, and poorly trained. Pollack writes:

Paris had relied primarily on French regulars to keep the peace in Syria and had neglected indigenous forces. Consequently, training was lackadaisical, discipline lax, and staff work almost unheard of. ... there were about 12,000 men in the Syrian army. These troops were mostly grouped into three infantry brigades and an armored force of about battalion size.

Between 1949 and 1966, a series of military coups destroyed the stability of the government and any remaining professionalism within the army. In March 1949, the chief of staff, General Husni al-Za'im, installed himself as president. Two more military dictators followed by December 1949. General Adib Shishakli then held power until deposed in the 1954 Syrian coup d'etat. Further coups followed, each attended by a purge of the officer corps to remove supporters of the losers from the force. "Discipline in the army broke down across the board as units and their commanders pledged their allegiance to different groups and parties. Indeed, by the late 1950s, the situation had become so bad that Syrian officers regularly disobeyed the orders of superiors who belonged to different ethnic or political groups."

The 1963 Syrian coup d'état had as one of its key objectives the seizure of the Al-Kiswah military camp, home to the 70th Armored Brigade. In June 1963, Syria took part in the Iraqi military campaign against the Kurds by providing aircraft, armoured vehicles and a force of 6,000 soldiers. Syrian troops crossed the Iraqi border and moved into the Kurdish town of Zakho in pursuit of Mustafa Barzani's fighters. There was another coup d'etat in 1966.

However, in 1967 the army did appear to have some strength. It had around 70,000 personnel, roughly 550 tanks and assault guns, 500 APCs, and nearly 300 artillery pieces. The army had 16 brigades: 12 infantry, 2 armored (probably including the 70th Armored), and 2 mechanized. The Syrian government deployed 12 of the 16 brigades to the Golan, including both armored brigades and one mechanized brigade. Three 'brigade groups', each comprising 4 brigades, were deployed: the 12th in the north, holding the sector from the B'nat Ya'acov bridge to the slopes of Mount Hermon, the 35th in the south from the B'nat Ya'acov bridge to the Yarmuk River border with Jordan, and the 42nd in reserve, earmarked for a theater-level counterattack role. During the Six-Day War Israeli assault of the Golan heights, the Syrian army failed to counterattack the Israelis as the Israelis breached the Syrian positions. While Syrian units fought hard whenever the Israelis entered their fields of fire, no attempts appear to have been made to exploit Israeli disorientation and confusion during the initial assault.

Judging from reports of 1967–1970, including the reporting of the 5th Infantry Division in 1970, the Army appears to have formed its first divisions during this period. The 1st and 3rd Armored Division, and 5th, 7th, and 9th Mechanized Infantry Divisions were all formed prior to 1973. Samuel M. Katz wrote that after Hafez al-Assad gained power in November 1970, the army expanded to the five divisions listed above, plus ten independent brigades, an artillery rocket brigade (the 69th), and "a reinforced brigade variously termed the 70th Armored Brigade or the Assad Republican Guard. It is today known as the Armored Defense Force; as Assad's praetorian guard it is stationed in and around Damascus and subordinate to the Defense Companies under the command of Assad's brother Rifaat."

=== 1970–2010 ===
On 18 September 1970, the Syrian government became involved in Black September in Jordan when it sent a reinforced armored brigade to aid the Palestine Liberation Organization. Syrian armored units crossed the border and overran Irbid with the help of local Palestinian forces. They encountered several Jordanian Army detachments, but rebuffed them without major difficulty. Two days later, the 5th Infantry Division, heavily reinforced, was also sent into Jordan. Two armored brigades were attached to the division, bringing its tank strength up to over 300 T-55s and its manpower to over 16,000. The division entered Jordan at ar-Ramtha, destroyed a company of Jordanian Centurion tanks there, and continued directly towards Amman.

Pollack says it is likely that they intended to overthrow the Jordanian monarchy itself. Despite defeating the Jordanian Army at al-Ramtha on 21 September, after fierce air attacks on 22 September, the Syrians stopped the attack and began to retreat. The retreat was caused by Jordan's appeal for international aid. According to the New York Post, the report said that Hussein "not only appealed for the moral and diplomatic support of the United Kingdom and the United States, coupled with the threat of international action, but had also asked for an air strike by Israel against Syrian troops."

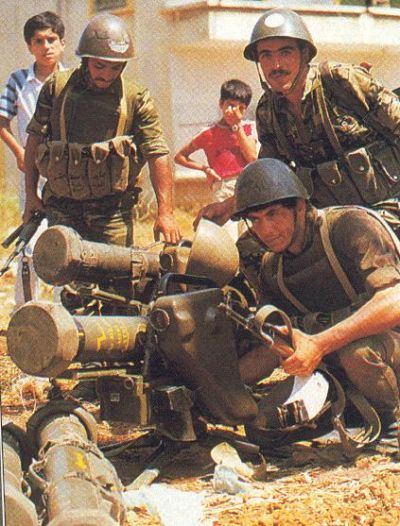
Syrian anti-tank teams deployed French-made MILAN ATGMs during the war in Lebanon in 1982.

After 1970 further Syrian engagements included:

- October War against Israel
- Lebanese Civil War (1975–1990), (against Lebanese militias, the PLO and Israel)

The Syrian armed forces have also been involved in suppressing dissident movements within Syria, for example the Islamist uprising in Syria in 1979–1982. In March 1980 the 3rd Armored Division and detachments from the Defense Companies arrived in Aleppo. The division was under the command of General Shafiq Fayadh, Hafez al-Assad's first cousin. The troops sealed "off whole quarters and carr[ied] out house-to-house searches, often preceded by tank fire." Hundreds of suspects were rounded up. Only two conventional Army brigades deployed to Hama in 1982, the 3rd Armored Division's 47th Armored and 21st Mechanized Brigades. Three quarters of the officers and one third of the soldiers in the two brigades were Alawites. Most of the repression was carried out by the Defense Companies and the Special Forces. Meanwhile, the Special Forces were isolating and combing through Hama, killing and capturing suspected government opponents.

Syrian forces fought Israel during the 1982 Lebanon War.

In 1984, Major General Ali Haidar's Special Forces were instrumental in blocking an abortive attempt by Rifaat al-Assad and his Defense Companies to seize the capital. Fayadh's 3rd Armoured Division moved into the capital to join Haidar's forces in the confrontation with the Defense Companies. The 3rd Armoured Division, it seems, had historically been based at al-Qutayfah, near Damascus.

Bennett dates the establishment of corps in the Syrian Army to 1985. Writing forty years later, Tom Cooper says "..despite the establishment of.. corps.. most division commanders continued reporting directly to the President. Correspondingly, not only the Chief of Staff of the Syrian Armed Forces but also the Corps HQ exercised only a limited operational control over the Army's divisions." Declassified CIA documents from February 1987 say that the 3rd Corps and 17th and 18th Armoured Divisions were established in 1986.

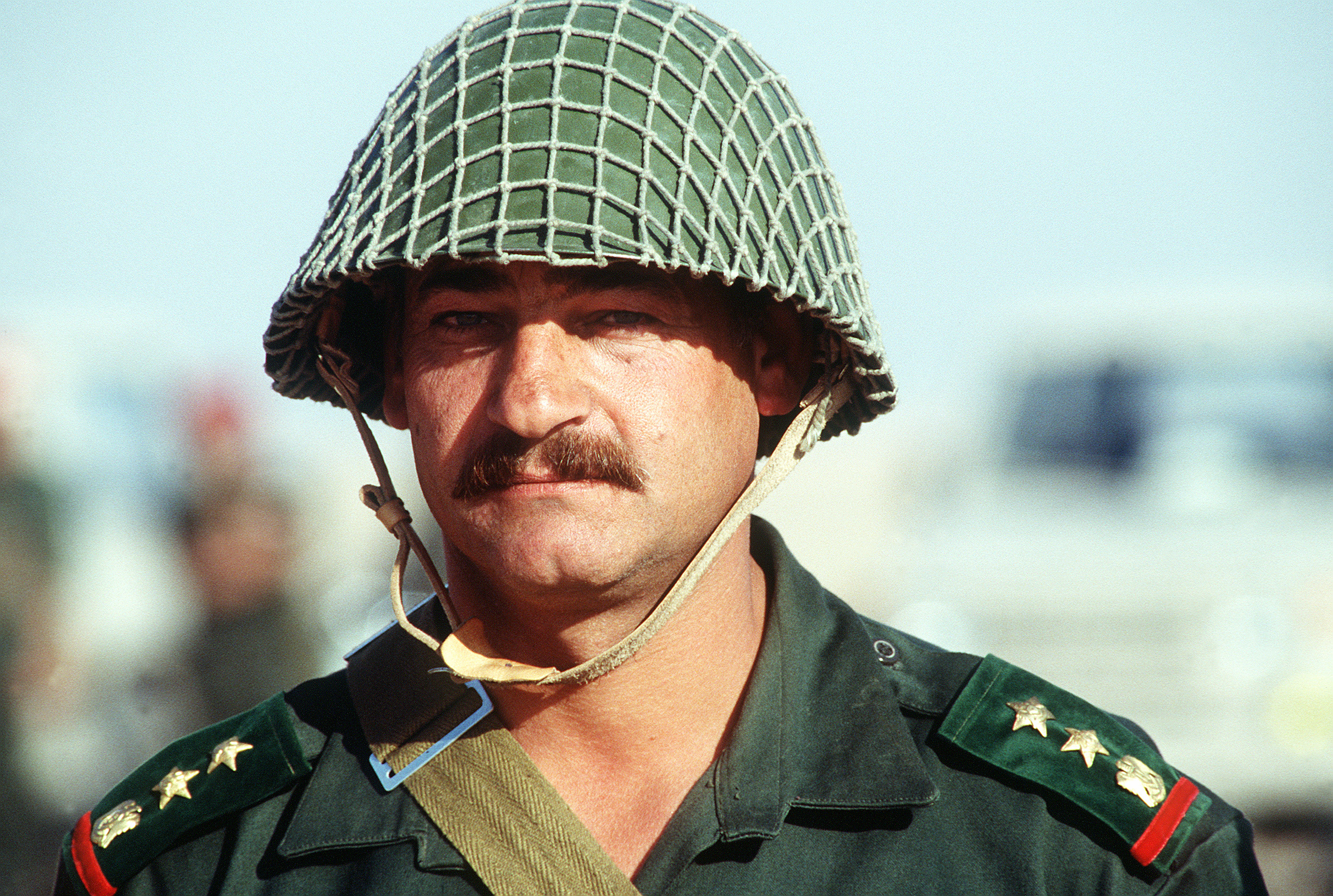
A Syrian colonel during the First Gulf War.

The 9th Armoured Division served in the 1991 Persian Gulf War as the Arab Joint Forces Command North reserve and saw little action.

In 1994, Haidar expressed objections to the Syrian president's decision to bring Bashar home from his studies in Britain and groom him for the succession after the death of Basil, the eldest Assad son. Soon afterwards, on 3 September 1994, Jane's Defence Weekly reported that then-President Hafez al-Assad had dismissed at least 16 senior military commanders. Among them was Haidar, then commander of the Special Forces, and General Shafiq Fayadh, a first cousin of the President who had commanded the "crack" 3rd Armored Division for nearly two decades. The 3rd Armored Division was "deployed around Damascus." JDW commented that "the Special Forces and the 3rd Armored Division, along with the 1st Armored Division are key elements in the security structure that protects Assad's government. Any command changes involving those formations have considerable political significance." Post-uprising reporting indicated the 1st Armored Division had historically been at al-Kiswah.

On 29 September 2004, Jane's Defence Weekly reported that Syria had begun to redeploy elements of one or more Syrian Army special forces regiments based in the coastal hills a few kilometres south of Beirut in Lebanon. A senior Lebanese Army officer told JDW that the 3,000 troops involved would return to Syria.

Cordesman wrote that in 2006 the Syrian Army had "organized two corps that reported to the Land Forces General Staff and the Commander of the Land Force."

As of 2010, the army's formations included three army corps (the 1st, 2nd, and 3rd), eight armored divisions (with one independent armored brigade), three mechanized divisions, one armored-special forces division and ten independent airborne-special forces brigades. The army had 11 divisional formations reported in 2011, with a fall in the number of armored divisions reported from the 2010 edition from eight to seven. The independent armored brigade had been replaced by an independent tank regiment.

In 2009 and 2010, according to the International Institute for Strategic Studies in London, the Syrian army comprised 220,000 regular personnel, and the entire armed forces (including the navy, air force and Air Defence Force) had 325,000 regular troops. Additionally, it had about 290,000 reservists.

=== Syrian Civil War ===
==== Military equipment in mid-2010 (including storage) ====
The vast majority of Syrian military equipment was Soviet manufactured.

- ≈ 9,300 armoured fighting vehicles (including in storage):
  - ≈ 4,950 main battle tanks
  - ≈ 3,950 infantry fighting vehicles and armored personnel carriers
- ≈ 2,030 towed artillery pieces:
  - 1,900 guns/howitzers
  - up to 500 multiple rocket launchers
- ≈ 500+ self-propelled artillery pieces (122mm and 152mm)
- 2,600 anti-tank guided weapon launchers
- ≈ 4,184 MANPADS
- 1,225+ anti-aircraft guns
- 94+ tactical surface-to-surface missile launchers

==== Defections ====
At October 1, 2011, according to high-ranking defected Syrian Colonel Riad Assaad, 10,000 soldiers, including high-ranking officers, had deserted the Syrian Army. Some of these defectors had formed the Free Syrian Army, engaging in guerilla-style attacks and combat with security forces and soldiers in what would turn into the Syrian Civil War.

At 16 November 2011, Rami Abdel Rahman, the head of the UK-based Syrian Observatory for Human Rights, however estimated that less than 1,000 soldiers had deserted the Syrian Army; at the same moment, an FSA battalion commander claimed that the FSA embraced 25,000 army deserters. Also in November 2011, the Free Syrian Army or the website of France 24 estimated the Syrian Army at 200,000 troops. According to General Mustafa al-Sheikh, one of the most senior defectors, however, in January 2012 the Syrian forces were estimated at 280,000 including conscripts.

By March 15, 2012, many more soldiers, unhappy with crackdowns on pro-democracy protesters, switched sides and a Turkish official said that 60,000 soldiers had deserted the Syrian army, including 20,000 since February 20. It was added that most of the deserters were junior officers and soldiers. By 5 July 2012, the Syrian Observatory for Human Rights estimated "tens of thousands" of soldiers to have defected. By August 2012, 40 brigadier generals from the Army had defected to the opposition army, out of a total of 1,200 generals.

On June 14, 2013, 73 Syrian Army officers and their families, some 202 people in total, sought refuge in Turkey. Amongst their number were seven generals and 20 colonels. In 2013, Agence France Press wrote on 'Syria's diminished security forces.'

==== Strength impaired ====
Up until July 2012, the scale of defections from the Syrian Army, though hard to quantify, was too small to make an impact on the strength of that army, according to Aram Nerguizian from the Washington-based Center for Strategic and International Studies. Strategically important units of the Syrian armed forces are always controlled by Alawite officers; defecting soldiers – by July 2012 "tens of thousands" according to the Syrian Observatory for Human Rights – are mainly Sunni without access to vital command and control, Nerguizian said, however the formed Syrian Minister of Defence General Dawoud Rajiha killed in the 18 July 2012 Damascus bombing was a Christian.

The army in Syria is the power structure. The armed forces would fight to an end. It would be a bloodbath, literally, because the army would fight to protect not only the institution of the army but the regime itself, because the army and the regime is one and the same.

— Fawaz Gerges, Lebanese-American author

Analyst Joseph Holliday wrote in 2013 that "the Assad government has from the beginning of the conflict been unable to mobilize all of its forces without risking large-scale defections. The single greatest liability that the Assad regime has faced in employing its forces has been the challenge of relying on units to carry out orders to brutalize the opposition." This has resulted in Bashar following his father's precedent by attaching regular army units to more reliable forces (Special Forces, Republican Guard, or 4th Armored Division). When Hafez al-Assad directed the suppression of revolts in Hama in 1982, this technique was also used.

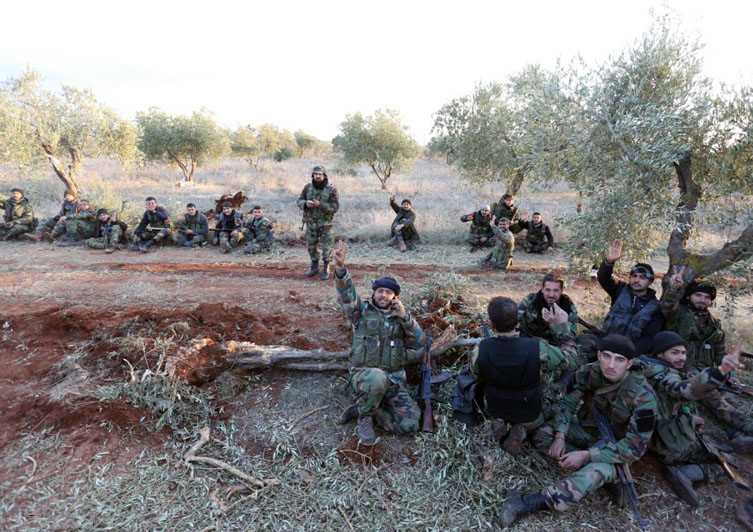
Syrian Army soldiers during the siege of Nubl and al-Zahraa

In 2014, analyst Charles Lister wrote that "As of April 1, 2014, the SAA had incurred at least 35,601 fatalities, which when combined with a reasonable ratio of 3 wounded personnel for every soldier killed and approximately 50,000 defections, suggests the SAA presently commands roughly 125,000 personnel. This loss of manpower is exacerbated by Syria's long entrenched problem of having to selectively deploy forces based on their perceived trustworthiness." The International Institute for Strategic Studies in London calculated that by August 2013 the strength of the Syrian army had, compared with 2010, roughly been cut in half, due to defections, desertions and casualties: it now counted 110,000 troops.

Prior to its collapse, the Syrian Arab Army suffered from serious recruitment issues as the Syrian Civil War dragged on, with military age men across sectarian lines no longer willing to join or serve their conscription terms. These issues were especially notable among the Druze population, who have clashed with regime security forces and broken Druze youths out of regime imprisonment to avoid them serving in the army. Increasingly, Assad's Alawite base of support refuse to send their sons to the military due to massive casualty rates among military age men in their community; according to pro oppositions sources a third of 250,000 Alawite men of fighting age have been killed in the Syrian Civil War, leading to major tensions between the sect and the Syrian government.

As of mid-2018, then-Israeli Defence Minister Avigdor Lieberman said that the Syrian Arab Army had regained its pre-2011 strength levels, recovering from manpower shortages earlier in the Syrian Civil War.

==== Roles of 3rd, 11th, 17th and 18th Divisions ====
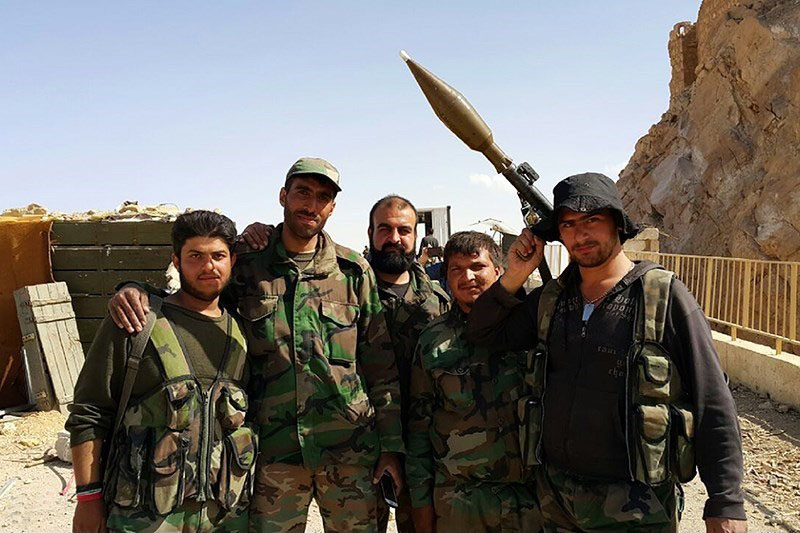
Syrian Army soldiers after the 2016 Palmyra offensive.

The 3rd Armored Division had deployed elements of three brigades from its bases around Qutayfah to Deraa, Zabadani, and Hama, while the 11th Armored Division had stayed close to its bases in Homs and Hama.

The European Council named Major General Wajih Mahmud as commander of the 18th Armored Division in the Official Journal of the European Union on 15 November 2011, sanctioning him for violence committed in Homs. Henry Boyd of the IISS noted that "in Homs, the 18th Armored Division was reinforced by Special Forces units and ... by elements of the 4th Division under Maher's de facto command."

Information from Holliday 2013 suggests that the reserve armored division is the 17th (rather than any other designation), which was responsible for eastern Syria. The division's 93rd Brigade left Idlib to secure Raqqa Governorate in early 2012. Following the reported capture of Raqqa on 3–6 March 2013, elements of the 17th Division remained under siege to the north of the city in October 2013.

=== Relationship with National Defence Force ===
The National Defence Force was under the control and supervision of the Syrian Army and acted in an infantry role, directly fighting against rebels on the ground and running counter-insurgency operations in co-ordination with the army which provided them logistical and artillery support.

Struggling with reliability issues and defections, officers of the SAA increasingly preferred the part-time volunteers of the NDF, who they regarded as more motivated and loyal, over regular army conscripts to conduct infantry operations and act as support for advancing tanks.

An officer in Homs, who asked not to be identified, said the army was increasingly playing a logistical and directive role, while NDF fighters act as combatants on the ground.

The NDF continued to play a significant role in military operations across Syria despite the formation of other elite units, many of which received direct assistance from Russia.

=== Post-Assad Syria ===
In December 2024, the Syrian Arab Army, alongside the Syrian Arab Republic itself, collapsed as the Assad regime fell. Some of the remaining Assad regime forces crossed into Iraq, others removed their uniforms before the rebels could arrive in Damascus, the last remaining territory controlled by the SAR. Retired U.S. General Wesley Clark said that a video showing Assad's forces evacuating to Iraq showed the "demoralization and collapse of an army", and that the forces knew they would lose, with the rebels taking Damascus and Assad's whereabouts unknown. He compared it to the fall of Kabul in 2021, where the U.S.-backed Afghan Armed Forces collapsed, and that when faced with certain defeat, armies simply "melt away".

At first, the leaders of the different Syrian rebel forces announced on 21 December 2024 that it would disband their forces and merge them under the defence ministry. A number of reconcillation centres opened all across the country as several soldiers that previously served under the Assad regime turned over their weapons to the state in exchange for new civilian identity cards to disassociate themselves from the old regime.

As of 11 December 2024, leaders of the Syrian Democratic Forces, the military forces of the Autonomous Administration of North and East Syria, were preparing for "negotiations that would create a broader-based Syrian government that is not under al-Sharaa's control". Leaders of the Southern Operations Room met with al-Sharaa on 11 December and expressed interest in "coordination", a "unified effort" and "cooperation", without stating that they would support the HTS transitional government.

On 17 December 2024, Prime Minister Mohammed Al-Bashir has said the defense ministry would be restructured using former rebel factions and officers who defected from Assad's army. Murhaf Abu Qasra (nom de guerre; Abu Hassan al-Hamawi), the military commander of Hay'at Tahrir al-Sham said to The Economist, "All military units will naturally transition to the ministry of defence, forming a unified army tasked with protecting the nation on behalf of all Syrians." The Economist added that Qasra insisted "..that there will be no place in the new Syria for jihadists eager to launch attacks". Abu Qasra, speaking with AFP, said that HTS would be "among the first to take the initiative" to dissolve its armed wing for a national army; on 21 December it was reported that Abu Qasra was appointed transitional Minister of Defense.

On 22 December 2024, Ahmed al-Sharaa said that the new Syrian government would announce the new structure of the Syrian military within days. Two days later, the transitional government announced that a meeting between opposition groups and Ahmed al-Sharaa "ended in an agreement on the dissolution of all the groups and their integration under the supervision of the ministry of defence".

On 26 December 2024, the "former forces of deposed leader Bashar al-Assad" killed 14 HTS fighters in the process of the new government capturing Mohammad Kanjo Hassan. General Hassan, the former chief of military justice and head of the field court, had been closely associated with the Sednaya Prison, where detainees had been often been brutally tortured. This has led to the Western Syria clashes against the Syrian transitional government.

On 29 December 2024, Ahmed al-Sharaa announced the promotion of 42 individuals to the rank of Colonel, 5 to the rank of Brigadier General, and 2 to the rank of Major-General in the Syrian Army. This number included Defense Minister Abu Qasra and new Chief of the General Staff of the Syrian Armed Forces and Army Ali Noureddine Al-Naasan, who were both elevated to the rank of Major-General. In January 2025 the defense ministry said that it has met with over 60 armed groups and claimed that all of the armed groups agreed to be a part of the armed forces and reorganized into units. but they reject the SDF proposal of creating a Kurdish "bloc" within the armed forces. Later in February the SDF, the Democratic Autonomous Administration of North and East Syria, and the Syrian Democratic Council decided in a meeting that the SDF would merge with the Syrian army.

On 8 March 2025, the Syrian Observatory for Human Rights reported that Syrian security forces and pro-government fighters had been involved in the mass killings of more than 750 Alawite civilians amidst clashes with supposed remaining pro-Assad groups in the western Governorates of Syria.

By June 2025, the Syrian transitional government had recruited half of its planned 200,000-man army by uniting various Syrian factions led by Hay'at Tahrir al-Sham, including 30,000 members of the Syrian National Army and 15,000 members of the Syrian Democratic Forces, as well as foreign fighters. Two-thirds of the senior commanders are HTS members. Reuters reported that the US gave the nod to Syria to integrate foreign fighters into its army.

In October 2025, SDF officials confirmed on October 14 and 15 that the SDF will integrate into the Syrian army in three divisions and several independent brigades, SDF negotiation committee member and Syriac Union Party co-chair Sanrib Barsoum stated that several SDF counterterrorism brigades will be deployed across the country as needed, The commander of the SDF-affiliated Northern Democratic Brigade told Kurdish media on October 14 that the SDF's Women's Protection Units will form a brigade in the Syrian army.

== Demographics ==
In 2011, the majority of the Syrian military were Sunni, but most of the military leadership were Alawites. Alawites made up 12% of the pre-war Syrian population, but 70% of the career soldiers in the Syrian Army. A similar imbalance is seen in the officer corps, where some 80% of the officers are Alawites. The military's most elite divisions, the Republican Guard and the 4th Armored Division, which are commanded by Bashar al-Assad's brother Maher, are exclusively Alawite. Most of Syria's 300,000 conscripts in 2011 were Sunni.

In mid-2022, the Minister of Defence and also Deputy Commander-in-Chief of the Army and the Armed Forces Lieutenant General Ali Mahmoud Abbas, and Major General Mufid Hassan, Deputy Chief of the General Staff, were some of the Sunni Muslims in the positions of power. Some volunteer brigades, such as Arab Nationalist Guard, are made up of Sunni Syrians and other Sunnis from the Middle Eastern region that adhere to pan-Arab ideals.

For many years compulsory and voluntary military service began at 18 years of age. Under the Assads, the conscript service obligation was 18 months, for many years; women were not conscripted but could volunteer to serve; and the re-enlistment obligation was 5 years, with retirement after 15 years or age 40 (enlisted) or 20 years or age 45.

== Structure ==
=== 2001 order of battle ===
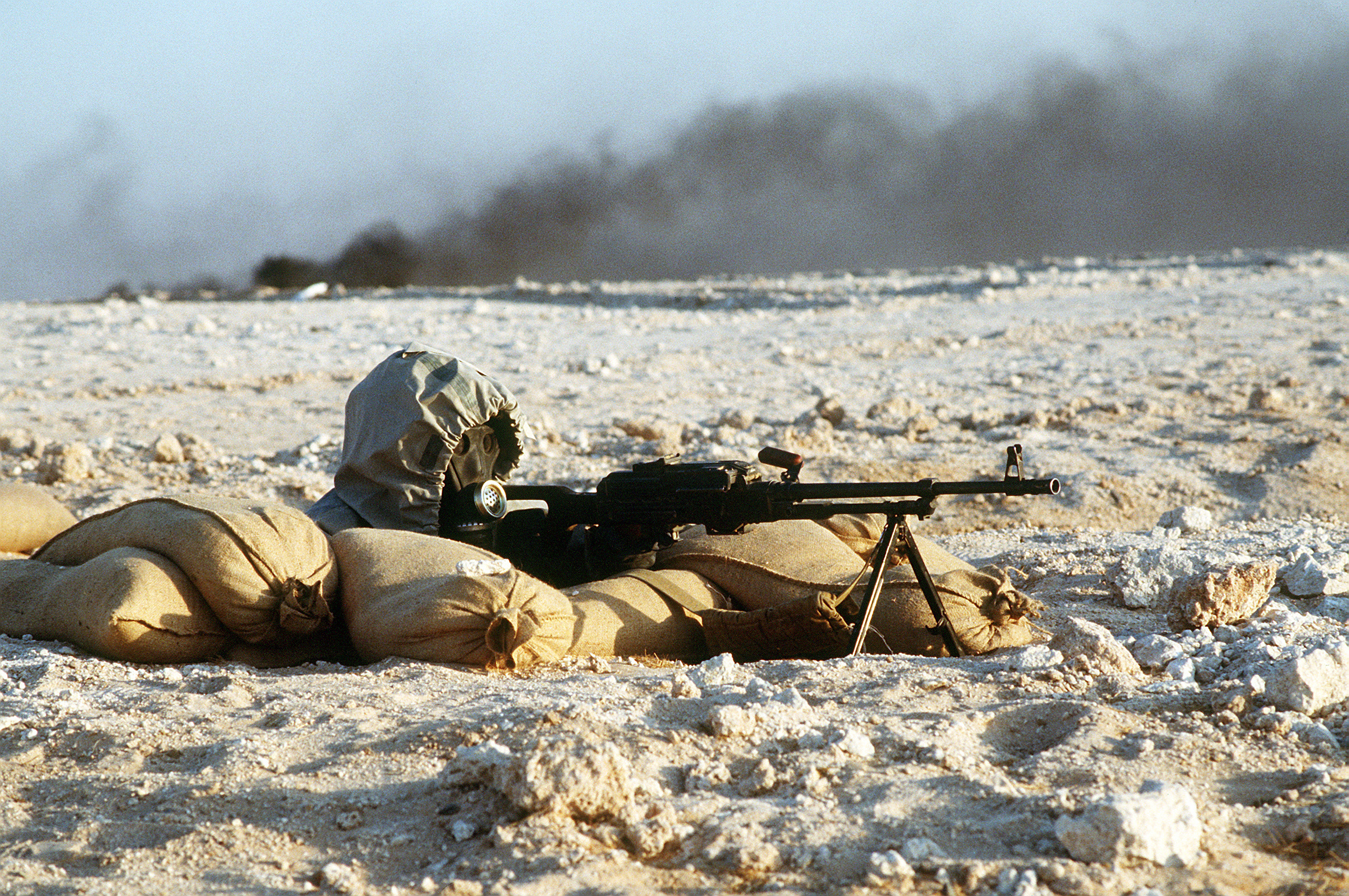
A Syrian soldier aims a 7.62mm PKM light machine gun from his position in a foxhole during a firepower demonstration, part of Operation Desert Shield. The soldier is wearing a ShMS gas-mask.

Before 2011, it was difficult to access reliable information about the SAA because of the Damascus government's sensitivity to potential espionage, particularly by Israel.

Richard Bennett wrote in 2001 that "..corps [were] formed in 1985 to give the Army more flexibility and to improve combat efficiency by decentralizing the command structure, absorbing at least some of the lessons learned during the Israeli invasion of the Lebanon in 1982." The organization and military doctrine of the army followed the Soviet model.

Richard Bennett's estimate of the 2001 order of battle was:

- 1st Corps HQ Damascus, which covered from Golan Heights, the fortified zone and south to Der'a near the Jordanian border.
  - 5th Armored Division, which included the 17th and 96th Armored Brigades and the 112th Mechanized Brigade
  - 6th Armored Division, with the 12th and 98th Armored Brigades and the 11th Mechanized Brigades
  - 7th Mechanized Division, with the 58th and 68th Armored Brigades and the 78th Mechanized Brigade
  - 8th Armored Division, which included the 62nd and 65th Armored Brigades and the 32nd Mechanized Brigade
  - 9th Armored Division, with the 43rd and 91st Armored Brigades and the 52nd Mechanized Brigade.

Bennett said the 1st Corps also [had] four independent special forces regiments, including two trained for heliborne commando operations against the Israeli signals intelligence & observation posts on Mount Hermon and elsewhere in the Golan Heights.

- 2nd Corps HQ Zabadani, covers north of Damascus, to Homs and includes Lebanon.
  - Bennett said in 2001 that the corps' principal units were believed to include:
  - 1st Armored Division, with the 44th and 46th Armored Brigades and the 42nd Mechanized Brigade
  - 3rd Armored Division, with the 47th and 82nd Armored Brigades and the 132nd Mechanized Brigade
  - 11th Armored Division, with the 60th and 67th Armored Brigades and the 87th Mechanized Brigade
  - 4th Mechanized Division with the 1st Armored Brigade and the 61st and 89th Mechanized Brigades
  - 10th Mechanized Division, headquartered in Shtoura, Lebanon. Its main units [were in 2001] deployed to control the strategic Beirut-Damascus highway with the 123rd Mechanized Brigade near Yanta, the 51st Armored Brigade near Zahle in the Beqaa Valley and the 85th Armored Brigade, deployed around the complex of positions at Dahr al-Baidar.
  - three other heavy brigades from the 3rd and 11th Armored Divisions [were] known to be regularly deployed to eastern Lebanon.
  - there [were] five special forces regiments in the Lebanon.
- 3rd Corps HQ Aleppo, based in the north and covered Hama, the Turkish and Iraqi borders, the Mediterranean coastline and was tasked with protecting the complex of chemical and biological warfare and missile production and launch facilities.
  - The 2nd Reserve Armored Division, with the 14th and 15th Armored Brigades and the 19th Mechanized Brigade. The 2nd [was] also believed to operate as the main armored forces training formation. It seems likely that the "2nd" designation, reported in 2001, was incorrect, as it has not been reported during the Syrian Civil War.
  - Other units under the control of this corps included four independent infantry brigades, one border guard brigade, one independent armored regiment, effectively a brigade group, and one special forces regiment.
  - the Coastal Defence Brigade, which [operated] largely as an independent unit within the 3rd Corps area, [was] headquartered in the naval base of Latakia with four Coastal Defence Battalions in Latakia, Banias, Hamidieh and Tartus. Each Battalion has four batteries of both the short range SSC-3 Styx and long range SSC-1B Sepal missile systems.

The IISS listed smaller formations in 2006 as:

- Four independent Infantry Brigades
- Ten independent Airborne Special Forces Regiments (Seven regiments attached to 2nd Corps)
- Two independent Artillery Brigades
- Two independent Anti-tank Brigades
- Surface-to-surface Missile Command with three SSM Brigades (each with three SSM battalions),
  - One brigade with FROG-7,
  - One brigade with Scud-B/C/D.
  - One brigade with SS-21 Scarab,
- Three coastal defence missile brigades
  - One brigade with 4 SS-C-1B Sepal launchers,
  - One brigade with 6 P-15 Termit launchers, alternative designation SS-C-3 'Styx'
  - One brigade with 6+ P-800 Oniks launchers,
- One Border Guard Brigade

Protecting Damascus:

- 4th Mechanized Division (The Defense companies were transformed into Unit 569, equivalent to an armored division, which in 1984 became the 4th Armoured Division.)
- The Republican Guard Armored Division, with three Armored brigades, one Mechanized brigade, and one artillery regiment.

==== Basic structure until 2011 ====
Joseph Holliday of the Institute for the Study of War described the basic structure of the Syrian Arab Army as:

- 3 Corps (Falaq): 50,000 men in 3–4 divisions each
- 14 Divisions (Firqa): 5,000–15,000 men in 5–6 brigades/regiments each
- More than 40 Brigades (Liwa): 2,500–3,500 men in 5–6 battalions (1–3 armored/mechanized + artillery/ADA/engineers) each
  - Mechanized:
    - 105 IFVs in 3 mechanized battalions
    - 41 Tanks in 1 armored battalion
    - 3,500 soldiers
  - Armored:
    - 105 Tanks in 3 armored battalions
    - 31 IFVs in 1 mechanized battalion
    - 2,500 soldiers
- More than 20 Regiments (Fawj): 1,500 men
  - Light Infantry: 1,500 soldiers in 3 infantry battalions
  - Artillery: 45 howitzers and 1,500 soldiers in 3 artillery battalions
- Battalion (Katiba): 300–500 men in 4–5 companies
- Company (Sariya): 60–80 men

=== 2022 order of battle ===
Between 2015 and 2018, the Syrian Arab Army underwent many structural changes, with the cooperation of Russia and Iran.

Syrian army "Special Forces" were specialized "light" infantry (airborne, air assault) and were "elite" only in relation to Assad's conventional mechanized and armoured units. Special Forces regiments were created to conduct counter-insurgency operations. Special Forces units included the: 41st, 45th, 46th, 47th, 53rd and 54th independent special forces regiments. Special Forces were heavily used from the early stage of the Syrian Civil War and as a result suffered heavy casualties, possibly up to three regiments (41st, 46th, 54th) may have been destroyed during the Syrian Civil War, the surviving three regiments were merged to other formations such as the Republican Guard, Tiger Forces and 4th Corps. Later reports state that two battalions from the 54th regiment serve within the 17th Division.

New units were created by 2021. As of August 2022, according to Gregory Waters, the structure was:

==== Units reporting to the Chief of Staff ====
- Republican Guard
  - 100th Artillery Regiment
  - 101st Security Regiment
  - 102nd Security Regiment
  - 103rd Commando Brigade
  - 104th Airborne Brigade
  - 105th Mechanized Brigade
  - 107th Artillery Regiment
  - 108th Armored Regiment
  - 109th Armored Regiment
  - 151st Mechanized Regiment
  - 152nd Mechanized Regiment
  - 800th Regiment
  - Lionesses of Defence Armored Brigade
  - 30th Division
    - 102nd Commando Brigade
    - 106th Mechanized Brigade
    - 123rd Special Forces Brigade
    - 124th Special Forces Brigade
    - 135th Mechanized Brigade
    - 47th Special Forces Regiment
    - 93rd Special Forces Regiment
    - 147th Special Forces Regiment
    - Artillery Regiment
- 4th Armoured Division
  - 38th Armored Brigade
  - 40th Armored Brigade
  - 41st Armored Brigade
  - 42nd Armored Brigade
  - 138th Mechanized Brigade
  - 333rd Infantry Regiment
  - 555th Special Forces (Airborne) Regiment
  - 666th Infantry Regiment
  - 154th Artillery Regiment
  - Al-Imam Hussein Brigade
  - Harakat Hezbollah al-Nujaba Syrian-wing

Special Forces units formed during the Syrian Civil War:

- 25th Special Mission Forces Division
  - 26th Infantry Brigade
  - 1st, 3rd, 4th, 5th, 6th and 7th Special Forces (Airborne) Regiments
  - 75th Armored Regiment
  - 78th Armored Regiment
  - Independent Artillery Regiment
- 16th Storming Brigade (Note: (created in 2020))

==== 1st Corps ====
- 5th Mechanized Division
  - 15th Mechanized Brigade
  - 112th Mechanized Brigade
  - 132nd Mechanized Brigade
  - 12th Armored Brigade
  - 38th Infantry Brigade
  - 59th Commando Battalion
  - 175th Artillery Regiment
- 6th Armored Division (formed in 2015)
  - 76th Armored Brigade
  - 85th Armored Brigade
  - 88th Armored Brigade
  - 55th Mechanized Brigade
  - 45th Special Forces Regiment
- 7th Mechanized Division
  - 88th Mechanized Brigade
  - 90th Mechanized Brigade
  - 121st Mechanized Brigade
  - 78th Armored Brigade
  - 70th Artillery Brigade
- 9th Armored Division
  - 34th Armored Brigade
  - 43rd Armored Brigade
  - 701st Armored Brigade
  - 52nd Mechanized Brigade
  - 467th Special Forces Regiment
  - 89th Artillery Brigade
- 15th Special Forces Division
  - 35th Special Forces Regiment
  - 44th Special Forces Regiment
  - 127th Special Forces Regiment
  - 404th Armored Regiment
  - 405th Armored Regiment
  - 176th Artillery Battalion

==== 2nd Corps ====
- 1st Armored Division
  - 61st Armored Brigade
  - 91st Armored Brigade
  - 153rd Armored Brigade
  - 57th Mechanized Brigade
  - 58th Mechanized Brigade
  - 68th Mechanized Brigade
  - 171st Infantry Brigade
  - 165th Artillery Brigade
  - 141st Artillery Regiment
  - 167th Anti-tank Regiment
- 2nd Armored Division (formed in 2015)
  - 144th Armored Brigade
  - 145th Armored Brigade
  - 73rd Infantry Brigade
  - 48th Special Forces Regiment
  - 53rd Special Forces Regiment
  - 826th Coastal Regiment
- 10th Mechanized Division
  - 18th Mechanized Brigade
  - 62nd Mechanized Brigade
  - 51st Armored Brigade
  - 58th Armored Brigade
  - 122nd Artillery Regiment
- 14th Special Forces Division
  - 36th Special Forces Regiment
  - 554th Special Forces Regiment
  - 556th Special Forces Regiment

==== 3rd Corps ====
- 3rd Armored Division
  - 20th Armored Brigade
  - 65th Armored Brigade
  - 81st Armored Brigade
  - 21st Mechanized Brigade
  - 155th Missile Brigade
  - 14th Artillery Regiment
  - 67th Artillery Regiment
- 8th Armored Division (formed in 2015)
  - 33rd Armored Brigade
  - 47th Armored Brigade
  - 45th Mechanized Brigade
  - 45th Artillery Regiment
- 11th Armored Division
  - 60th Armored Brigade
  - 67th Armored Brigade
  - 87th Mechanized Brigade
  - 89th Artillery Regiment
  - 135th Artillery Regiment
- 17th Reserve Division
  - 137th Mechanized Brigade
  - 93rd Armored Brigade
  - 54th Special Forces Regiment
  - 121st Artillery Regiment
  - 123rd Artillery Regiment
- 18th Armored Division
  - 131st Armored Brigade
  - 134th Armored Brigade
  - 167th Armored Brigade
  - 120th Mechanized Brigade
  - 64th Artillery Regiment
- Border Guard Forces
  - 5th Regiment (Hasakah pocket)
  - 6th Regiment (Southern Homs)
  - 8th Regiment (Jordan-Syria border)
  - 10th Regiment (Iraq-Syria border)
  - 11th Regiment (Latakia)
  - 12th Regiment (Manbij and Ayn al-Arab)
  - Unknown Regiment (likely Lebanon-Syria border)
  - 87th Battalion (Talkalakh)

==== 5th Assault Corps ====
- 1st Assault Brigade
  - 13th Battalion
  - 1579th Battalion
- 2nd Assault Brigade
- 3rd Assault Brigade
  - 103rd Battalion
- 4th Assault Brigade
  - Ba'ath Battalion
- 5th Assault Brigade
  - 1st Infantry Regiment
  - 2nd Infantry Regiment
- 6th Assault Brigade
  - 79th Infantry Battalion
  - 86th Infantry Battalion
- 7th Assault Brigade
  - 3rd Infantry Battalion
- 8th Assault Brigade
- al-Quds Brigade
  - Lions of al-Quds Battalion
  - Defenders of Aleppo Battalion
  - Deterrence Battalion
  - Lions of al-Shahba Battalion
- 103rd and 148th Artillery Brigades

=== Major officials and units, July 2026 ===
After HTS seized control, it created a new army from its forces and acceding groups (e.g. SNA, NFL, SDF, etc.). After the 2026 northeastern Syria offensive and the subsequent January 29 ceasefire, the SDF agreed to be integrated into the structure of the Syrian Army.

| Role/Unit | Name/Commander | Notes |
Ministry of Defense
| Minister of Defense | Major General Murhaf Abu Qasra | |
| Chief of Staff | Major General Ali Noureddine al-Naasan | |
| Deputy Minister of Defense | Major General Mohammed Khair Hassan Shuaib | |
| Spokesperson for the Ministry of Defense | Brigadier General Hassan Abdul Ghani | |
| Head of Northern Syria Corps | Brigadier General Awad al-Jassem | |
| Head of Coastal Syria Corps | Brigadier General Munir al-Sheikh | |
| Head of Central Syria Corps | Brigadier General Haythem al-Ali | |
| Head of Eastern Syria Corps | Brigadier General Ahmed al-Jassem | |
| Head of Southern Syria Corps | Brigadier General Omar Jaftashi | |
| Head of Officer Affairs | Brigadier General Mohammed Mansour | |
| Head of the Medical Administration | Dr. Ahmed al-Youssef | |
| Director of the Higher Military Academy in the Syrian Ministry of Defense | Brigadier General Fadlallah al-Haji | |
Armed Forces
Latakia and Tartous
| 50th Coastal Division (NFL) | Brigadier General Ahmed Ismail | |
| 56th Division (HTS) | Brigadier General Munir Al-Sheikh | |
| 84th Division (Foreign fighters) | Brigadier General Abu Muhammad Turkistani | |
| 74th Special Forces Division (AG/NFL) | Brigadier General Jamil al-Saleh | |
Aleppo and Idlib
| 76th Division (SNA) | Brigadier General Sayf Bulad | |
| 80th Division (SNA/NFL) | Brigadier General Ahmed Rizk | |
| 60th Division (HTS/SNA/SDF) | Brigadier General Awad al-Jassem | |
| 62nd Division (SNA) | Mohammed al-Jassem | |
Hama and Homs
| 54th Division (NFL) | Vacant | |
| 82nd Special Forces Division (SM) | Brigadier General Khaled Al-Halabi Abu Khattab | |
| 52nd Special Forces Division (HTS/SNA) | Brigadier General Haitham al-Ali | |
| 40th Division (NFL/EB) | Colonel Binyan al-Hariri | |
Damascus and Daraa
| 44th Special Forces Division (HTS/NFL) | Brigadier General Abu Abdul Rahman Najib | |
| 70th Division (SNA/SFA) | Essam al-Buwaydhani | |
| 64th Division (NFL) | Brigadier General Muhammad Ahmad al-Gharib | |
Raqqa, Hasakah and Deir ez Zor
| 72nd Division (SNA/SDF) | Colonel Doghan Suleiman | |
| 42nd Division (SNA/NFL) | Brigadier General Raed Arab | |
| 66th Division (HTS/SNA) | Colonel Ahmed Al-Muhammad | |
| 86th Division (SNA) | Brigadier General Abu Hatem Shaqra | |

== Military equipment ==
Following the fall of the Assad regime, Israel launched several strikes on Syrian military bases, destroying up to 80% of the country's ammunition stocks as well as their navy, most of their air force and the majority of their strategic weapons stocks. Restructuring of the Syrian military is currently ongoing with Turkish military assistance.

Prior to the fall of the Assad regime, most Syrian military equipment were purchased from the Soviet Union, and later on, Russia; Iranian-made Western weapons and equipment were also used as well, mostly as captured equipment from opposition forces, though were mostly reserved for the Syrian Republican Guard.

== Uniforms, weapons and rank insignia ==
=== Uniforms and personnel equipment ===
Service uniforms for Syrian officers generally followed the British Army style, although army combat clothing followed the Soviet model. Each uniform had two coats: a long one for dress and a short jacket for informal wear. Army officer uniforms were khaki in summer, olive in winter. All Army (including paratroops and special forces) and Air Defense Force personnel wore camouflage uniforms. Among the camouflage were Red Lizard, Syrian Leaf patterns, and EMR Desert; a locally made copy of the ERDL and M81 Woodland. In addition to these patterns, the Syrian Armed Forces have also been observed wearing MultiCam uniforms. Photographs and official documentation show its use among Army, Navy, and Air Force officers and enlisted personnel in the 2025. Reports indicate that its use by Syrian forces began as early as 2022, when personnel were documented wearing MultiCam during joint training with Russian special forces.

Officers had a variety of headgear, including a service cap, garrison cap, and beret (linen in summer and wool in winter). The color of the beret varied according to the officer's unit. The most common beret color was black, for Infantry, Engineering, Signals and supporting arms personnel, followed by green, for Armored, Mechanized and Artillery personnel, red for the Republican Guard and Military Police, and maroon (blue) for the Special Forces.

Since 2009, the SAA had acquired large numbers of Chinese-produced combat gear, including helmets and bullet proof vests. In 2011, the standard issue combat helmets were the olive Chinese QGF-02, and the Soviet SSh-68 for the reserve forces. Both of them could be equipped with the Syrian Leaf camouflage helmet covers. Since 2015, some regular units were equipped with 6B7 helmets from Russia. Standard protective gear for all Army units were (PASGT) TAT-BA-7 bullet-proof vests. The Republican Guard and Special Forces were the only units equipped with ACH, FAST, 6B47 helmets and 6B45, Ruyin-3 ballistic vests. The Syrian military also provided NBC uniforms to soldiers to remain effective in an environment affected by biological or chemical agents. This uniform consisted of a Russian-made Model GP-5, PMK and ShMS-41 masks.

=== Service weapons ===
Service weapons of the Syrian Arab Army consisted of stocks of Cold War-era arms. Main service pistols of the Syrian Army were Makarov PM and Stechkin-APS. Main service assault rifles were Soviet AKM/AKMS, AK-74, Chinese Type 56 and Sa vz. 58. Main service carbines were AKS-74U and copies of Belgian FN FAL. The Syrian Army used the Dragunov SVD sniper rifle and derivatives like the Tabuk and PSL. The Army had also modern sniper weapons like the Steyr SSG 69, Heckler & Koch G3 and Syrian-made Golan S-01. The most widely used machine guns were RPK, PKM, Type 73, NSV and PKP Pecheneg. Until 2011, the procurement of large numbers of AK-74Ms was planned to replace the AK(M) and other derivatives, the Civil War put a halt to this large scale re-equipment programme. Since 2015, Syrian forces had received significant equipment assistance from Russia.

=== Missile capabilities ===
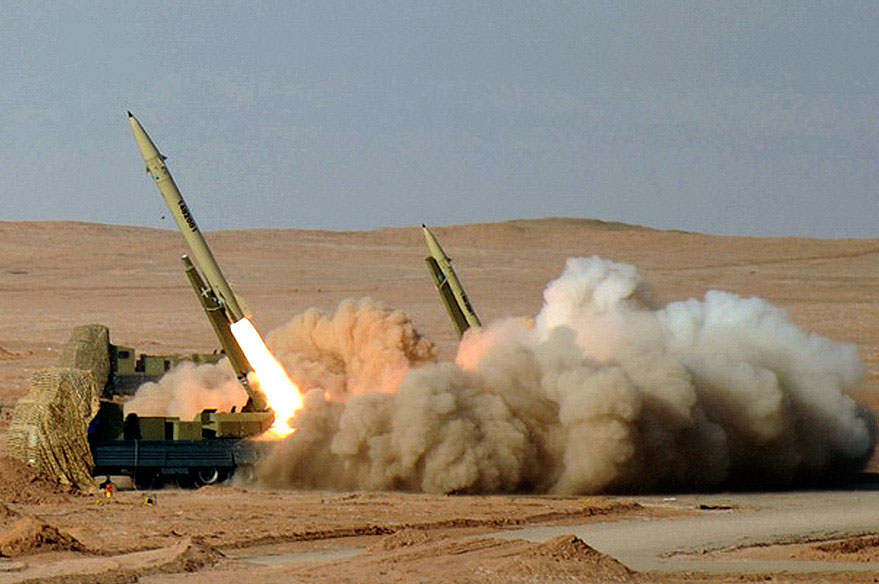
Fateh-110 (M-600 or Tishreen)

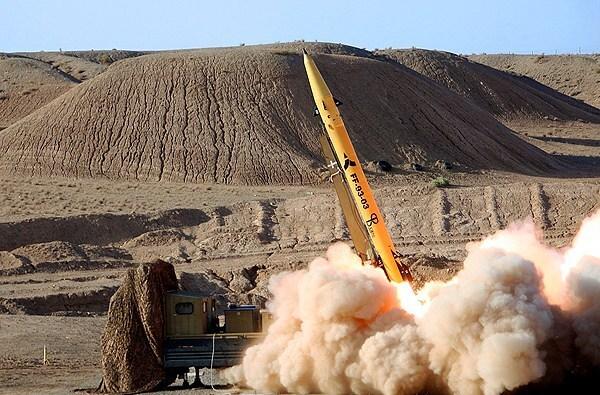
Fateh-313

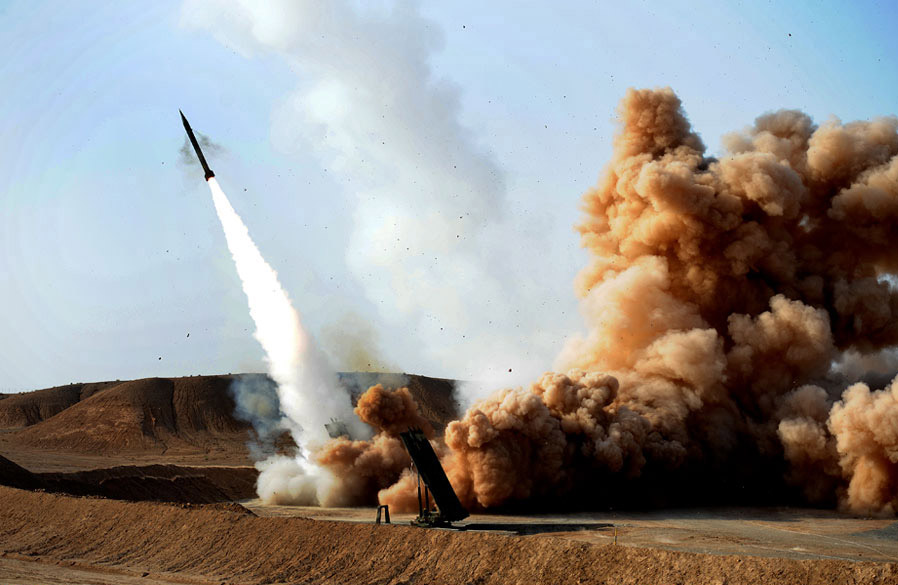
Zelzal-3

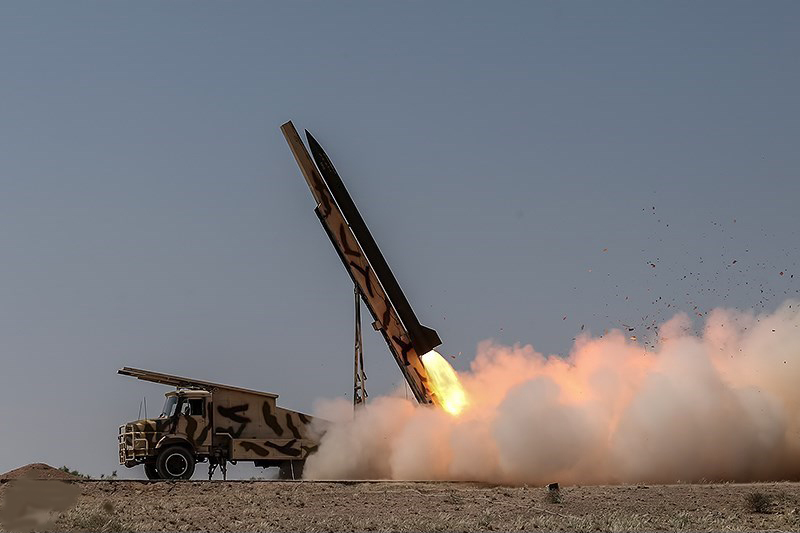
Naze'at

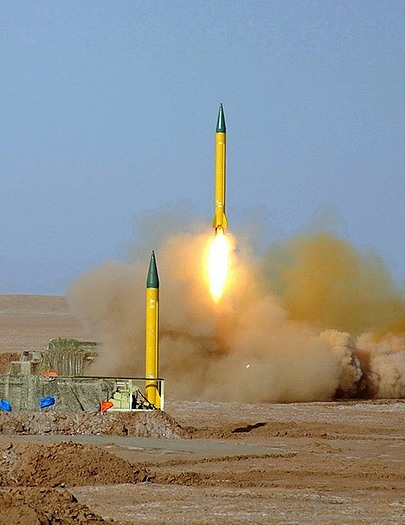
Shahab-1

At the beginning of the 1990s, Syria had one of the largest missile arsenals among the Third World countries, which until then had been replenished exclusively with the 9K52 Luna-M (70 km), OTR-21 Tochka (120 km) and Scud-B (300 km) systems supplied by the USSR. However, after the collapse of the USSR, a trend towards diversification of missile imports emerged. An agreement was concluded with China on the supply of M-9 (600 km) and M-600 missiles with a range of 250 to 300 kilometers to Syria. In 1991 and 1992, two batches of Scud-C or Hwasong-6 missiles (600 km) of North Korean missile program manufacture were delivered to Syria. There were plans to increase the range of Scud missiles by reducing the weight of the warhead and creating solid-fuel medium-range missiles from foreign components. According to some reports, financial support for the creation of the missile-building base was provided by Iran.

Table of basic data on missiles and their quantities at the beginning of the 2020s
| Name | Range (km) | Warhead mass (kg) | Number | Type/CEP |
|---|---|---|---|---|
| 9K52 Luna-M | 65 | 420 | 700 | Artillery rocket 500 m |
| SS-1C Scud-В; Hwasong-5 | 300 | 1000 | 900+ | SRBM; 450 m |
| SS-1D Scud-C; Hwasong-6; Golan-1 | 600 | 770 | 2000 | SRBM; 700 m |
| SS-1E Scud-D; Hwasong-7 | 700–1000 | 650–1200 | N/A | MRBM; 250–500 m |
| Golan-2 | 850 | 650–1200 | N/A | SRBM; 250–500 m |
| Scud-ER; Hwasong-9 | 800–1000 | 450–500 | N/A | MRBM; 3000 m |
| SS-21 Scarab; OTR-21 Tochka | 70–120 | 420 | N/A | SRBM; 95–150 m |
| Fateh-110; Tishreen (M-600) | 300 | 500 | N/A | SRBM; 100 m |
| Fateh-313 | 500 | 380 | N/A | SRBM; 2 m |
| Fath 360 | 30–120 | 150 | N/A | TBM; 30 m |
| Shahab-1 | 350 | 1000 | N/A | SRBM; 450 m |
| Shahab-2 | 500 | 770 | N/A | SRBM; 500 m |
| Zelzal-1 | 160 | 600 | N/A | SRBM; 400 m |
| Zelzal-2 | 210 or 400+ | 600 | N/A | SRBM; 350 m |
| Maysaloun | 130–600 | 600 | N/A | SRBM; 300 m |
| Zelzal-3 | 250–400 | 600 | N/A | SRBM; 300 m |
| Naze'at | 100–160 | 500 | N/A | Rocket artillery 500 m |

=== Ranks ===
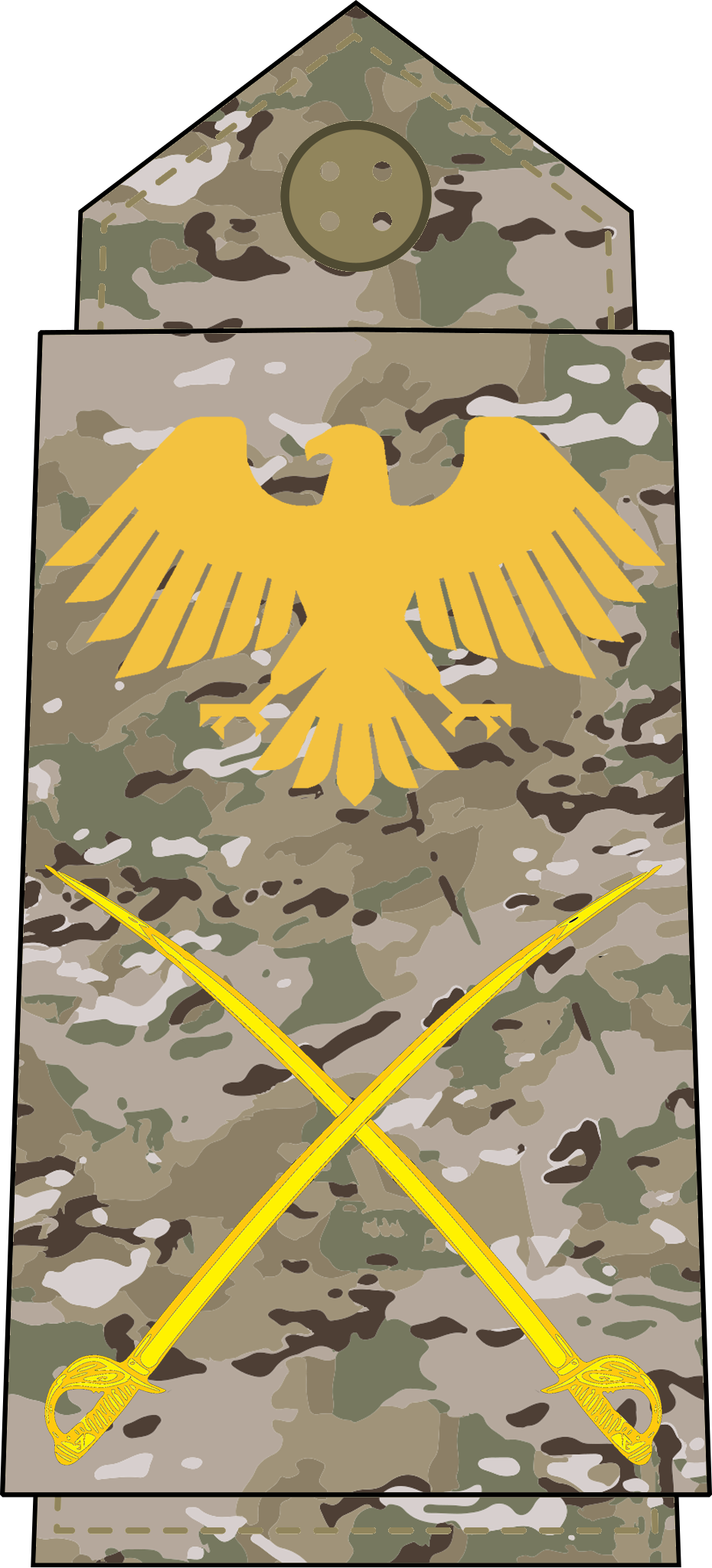
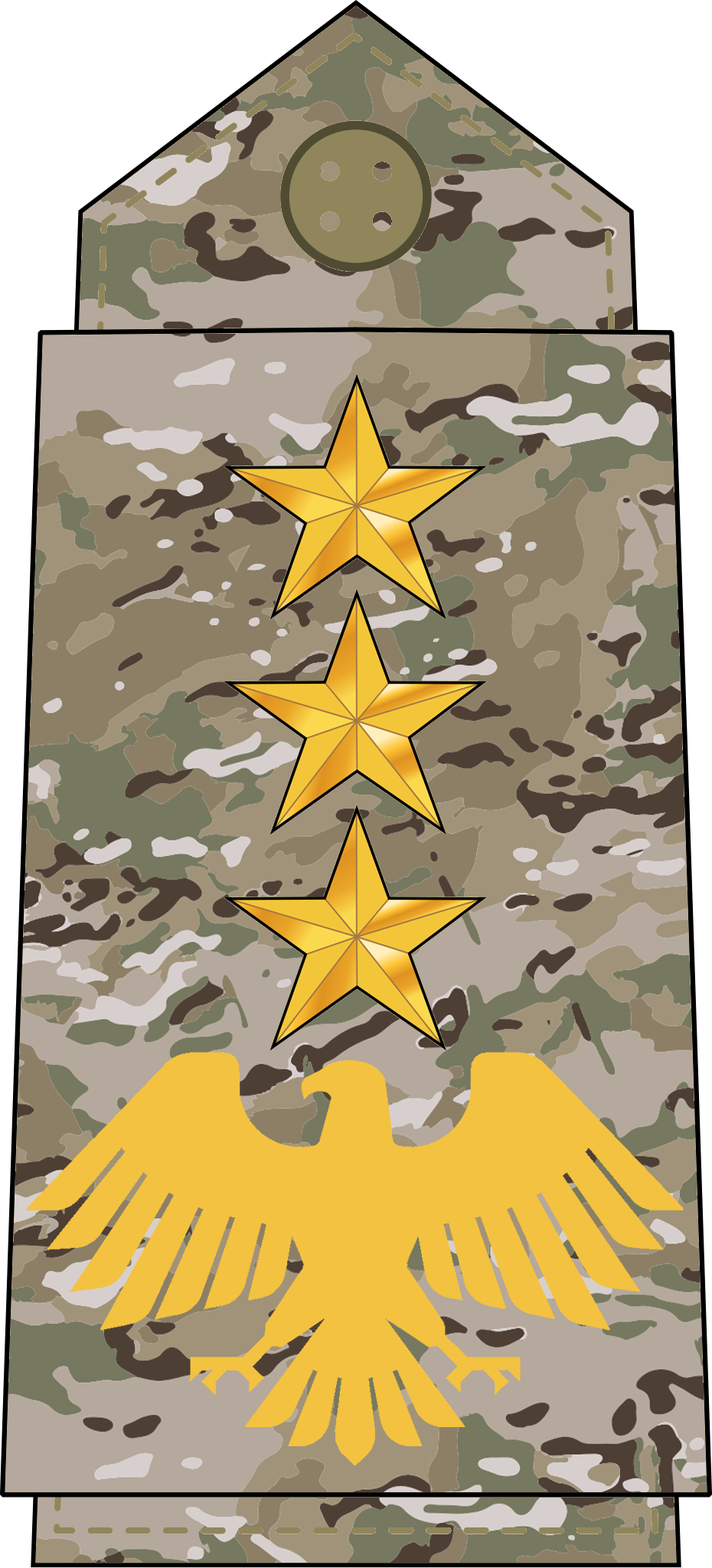
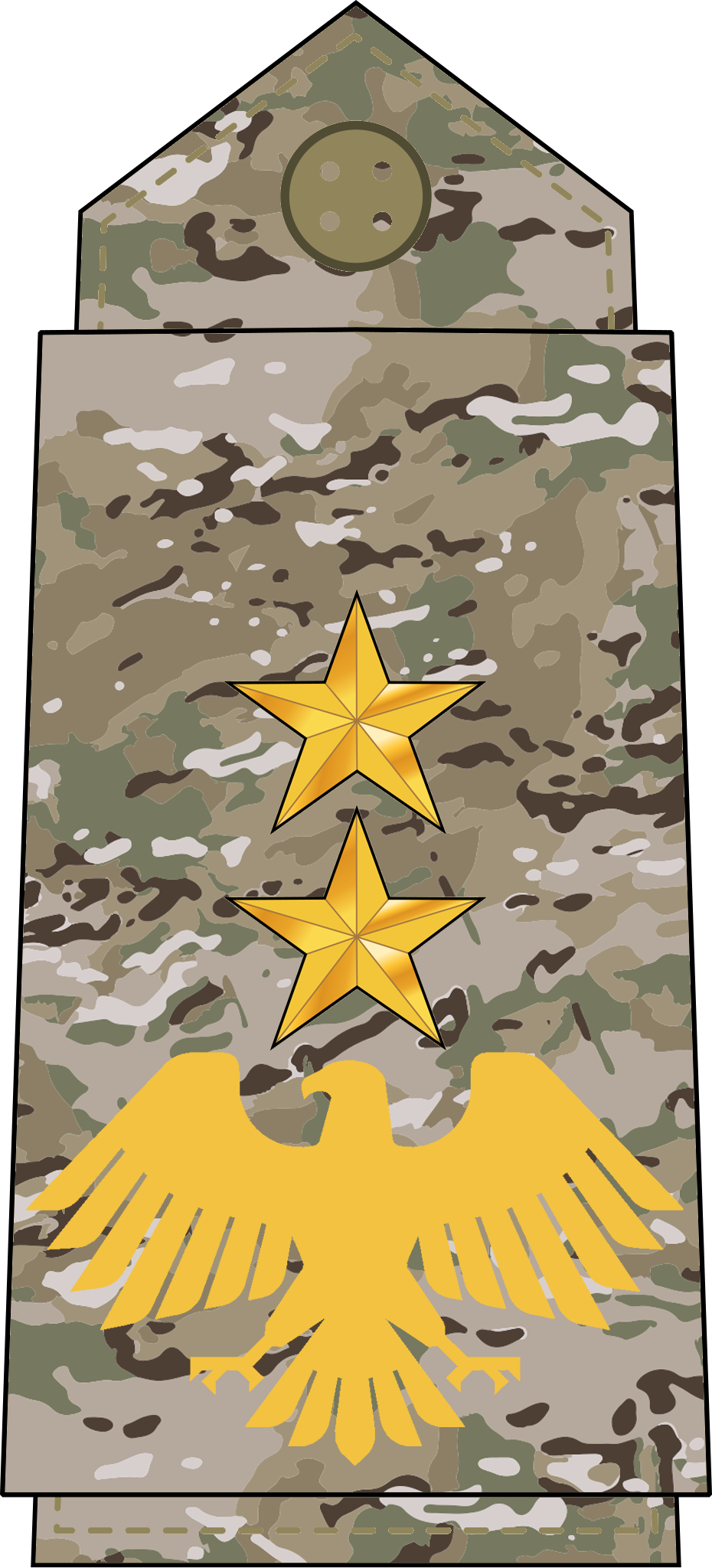
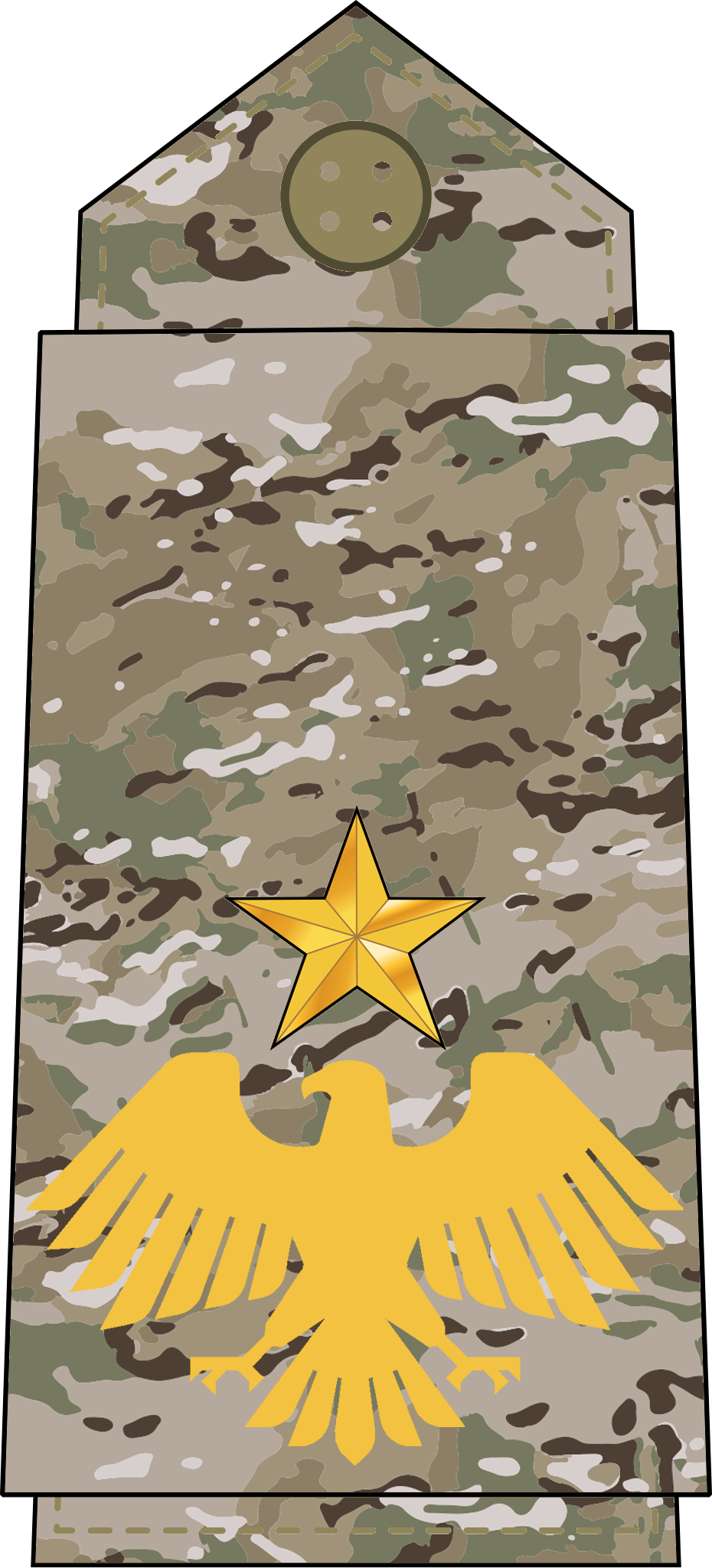
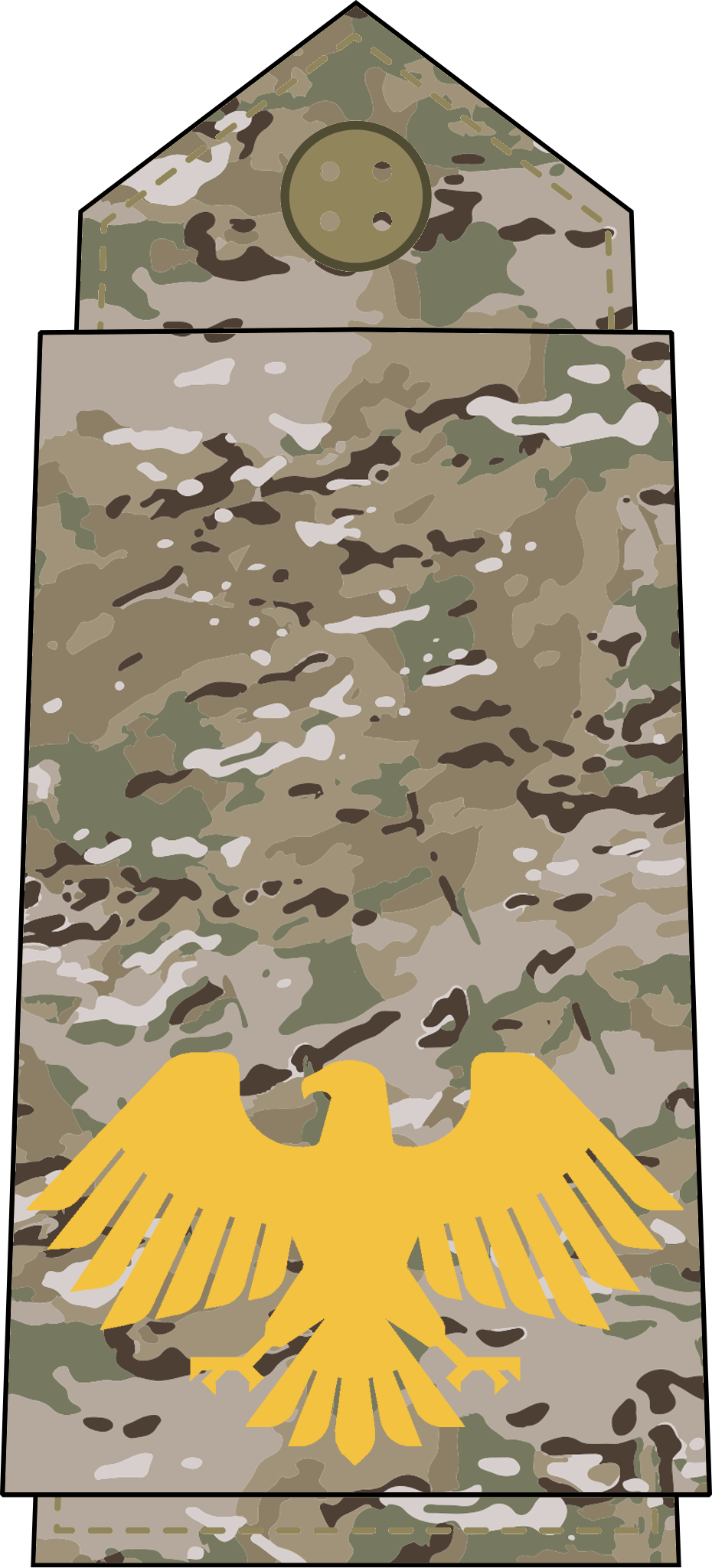
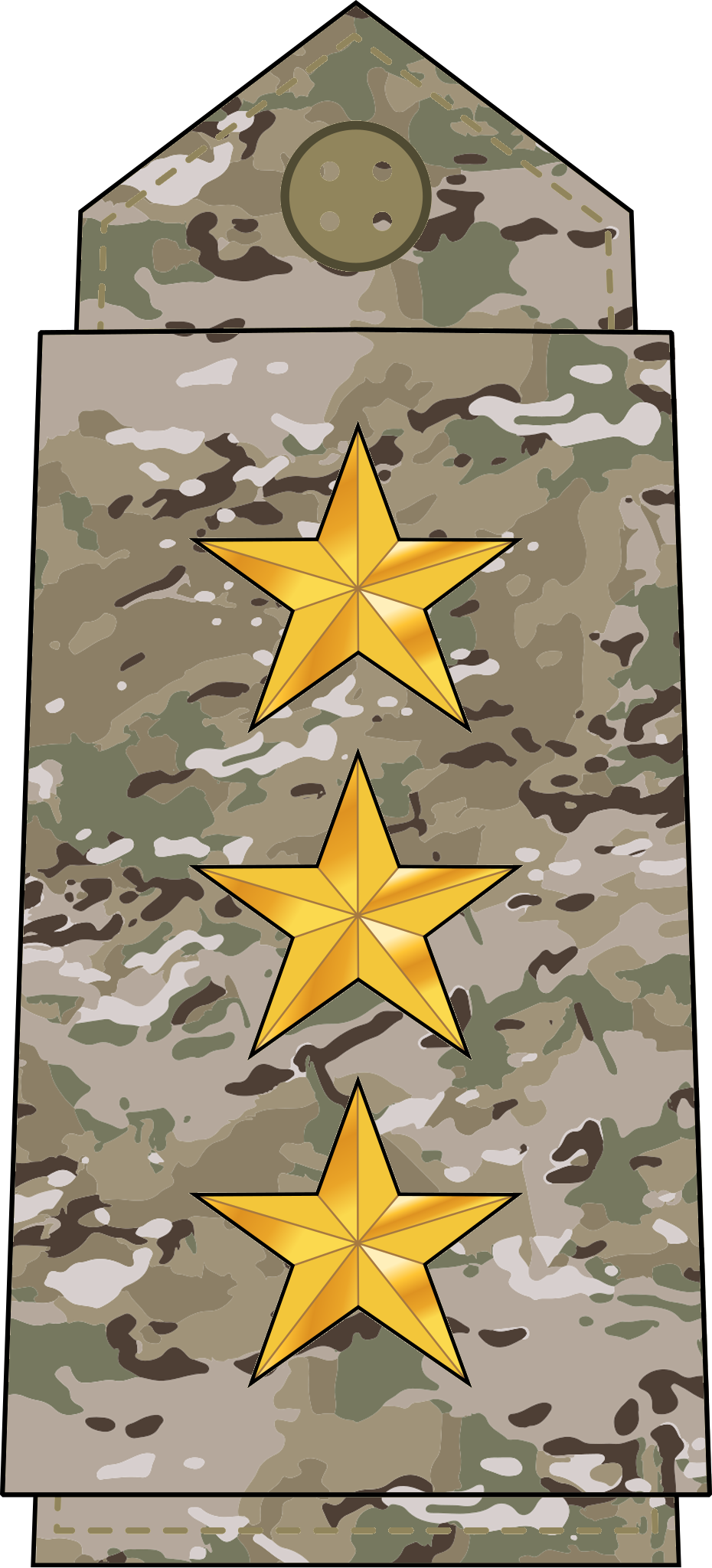
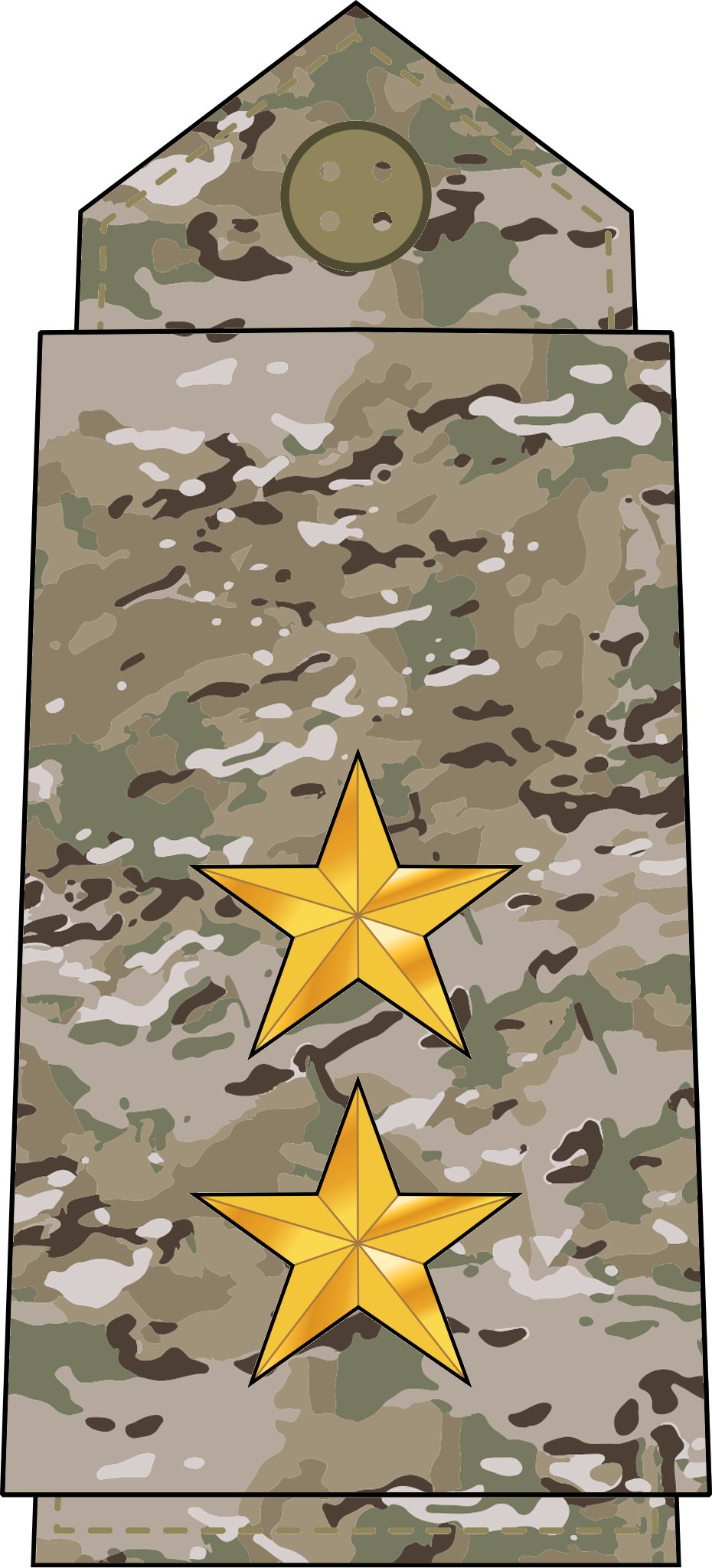
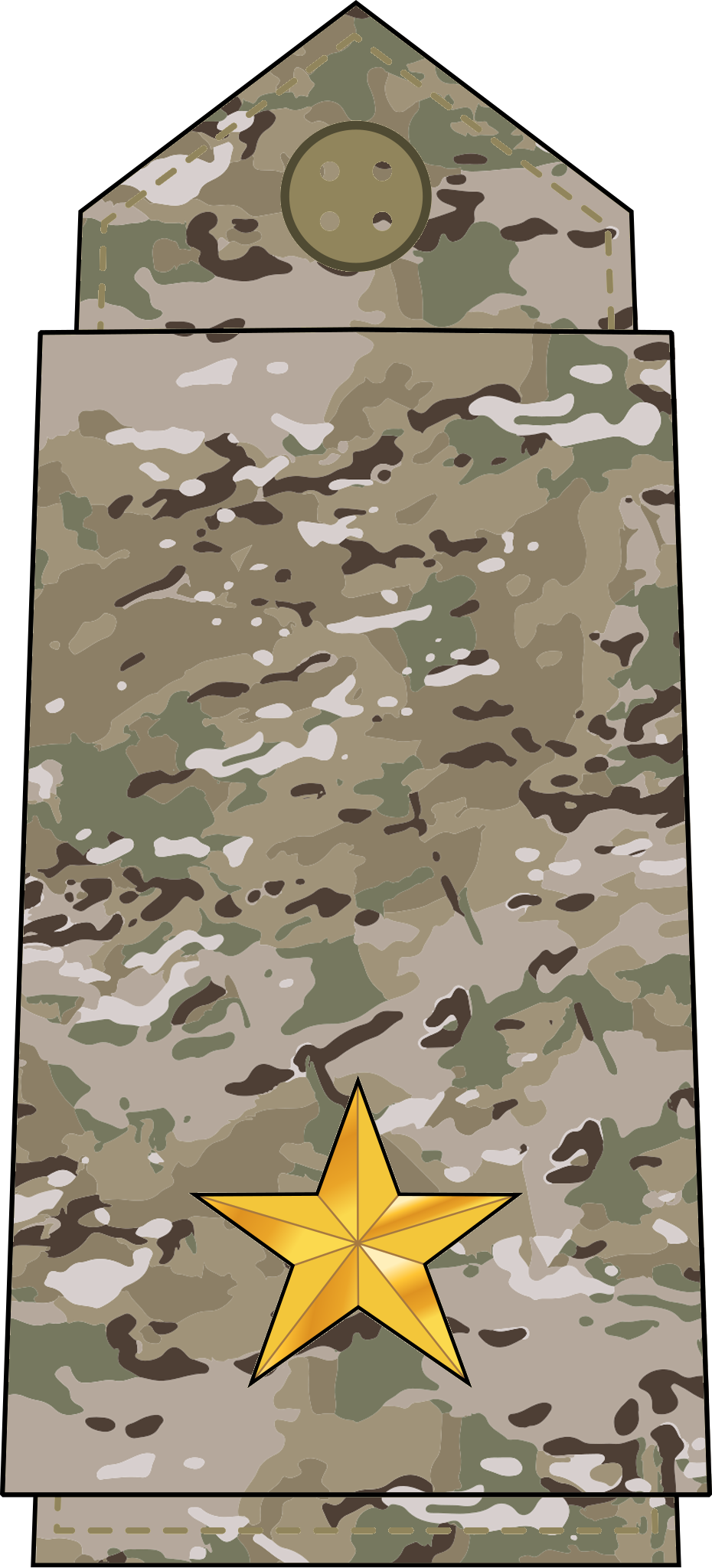
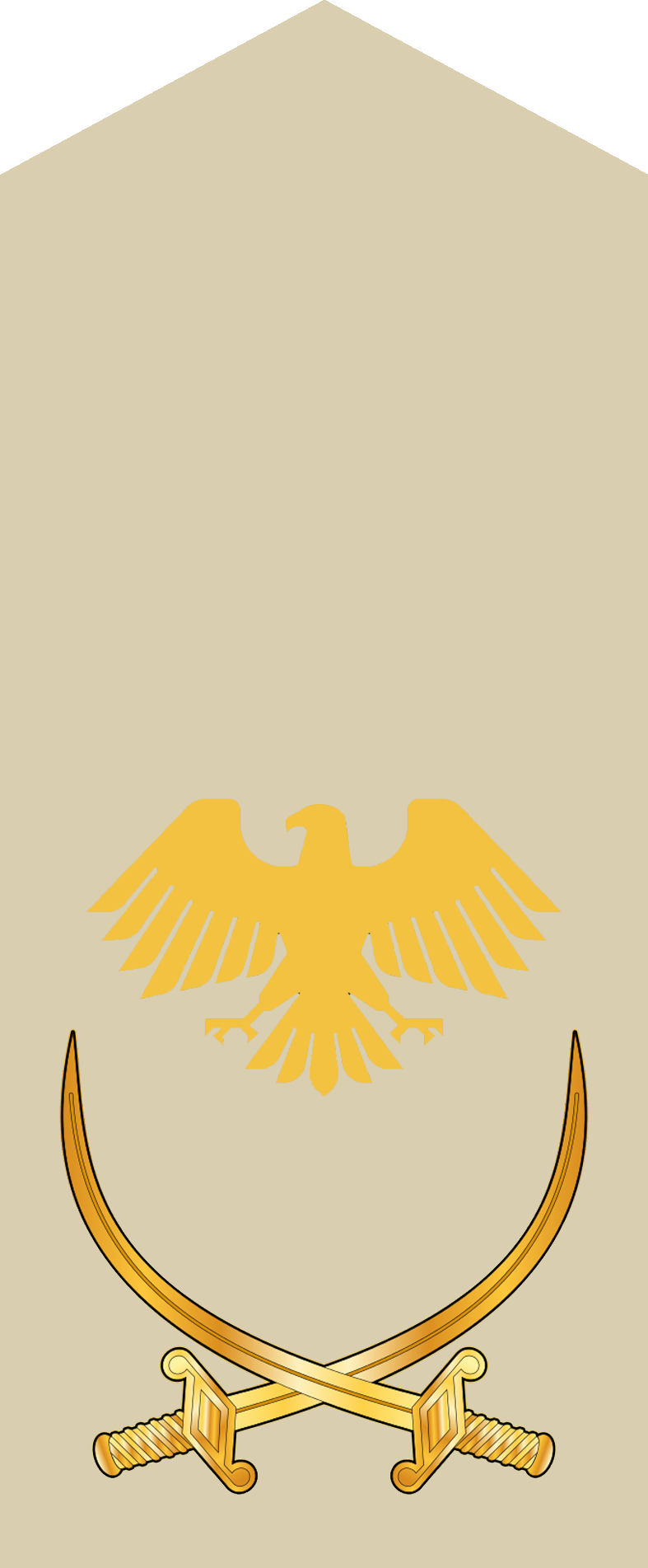
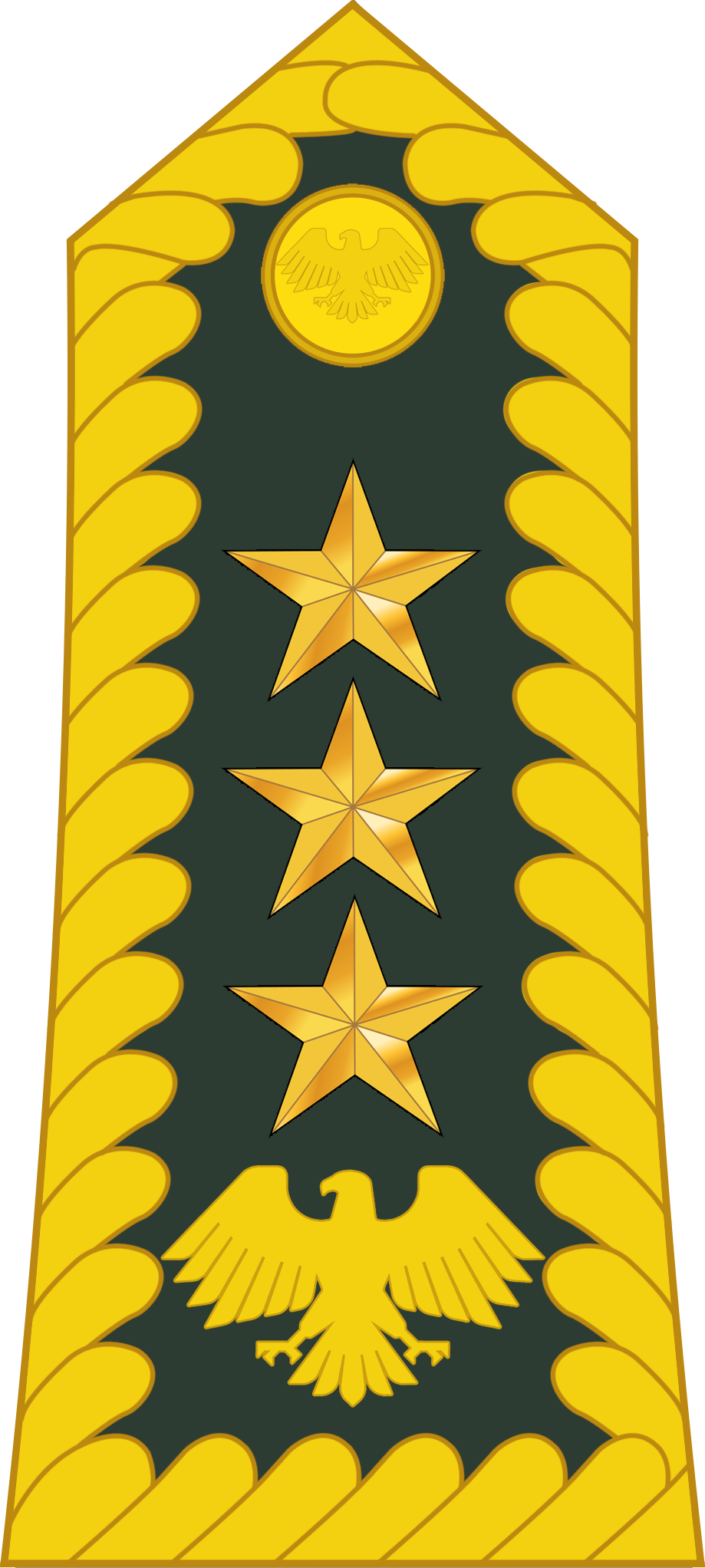
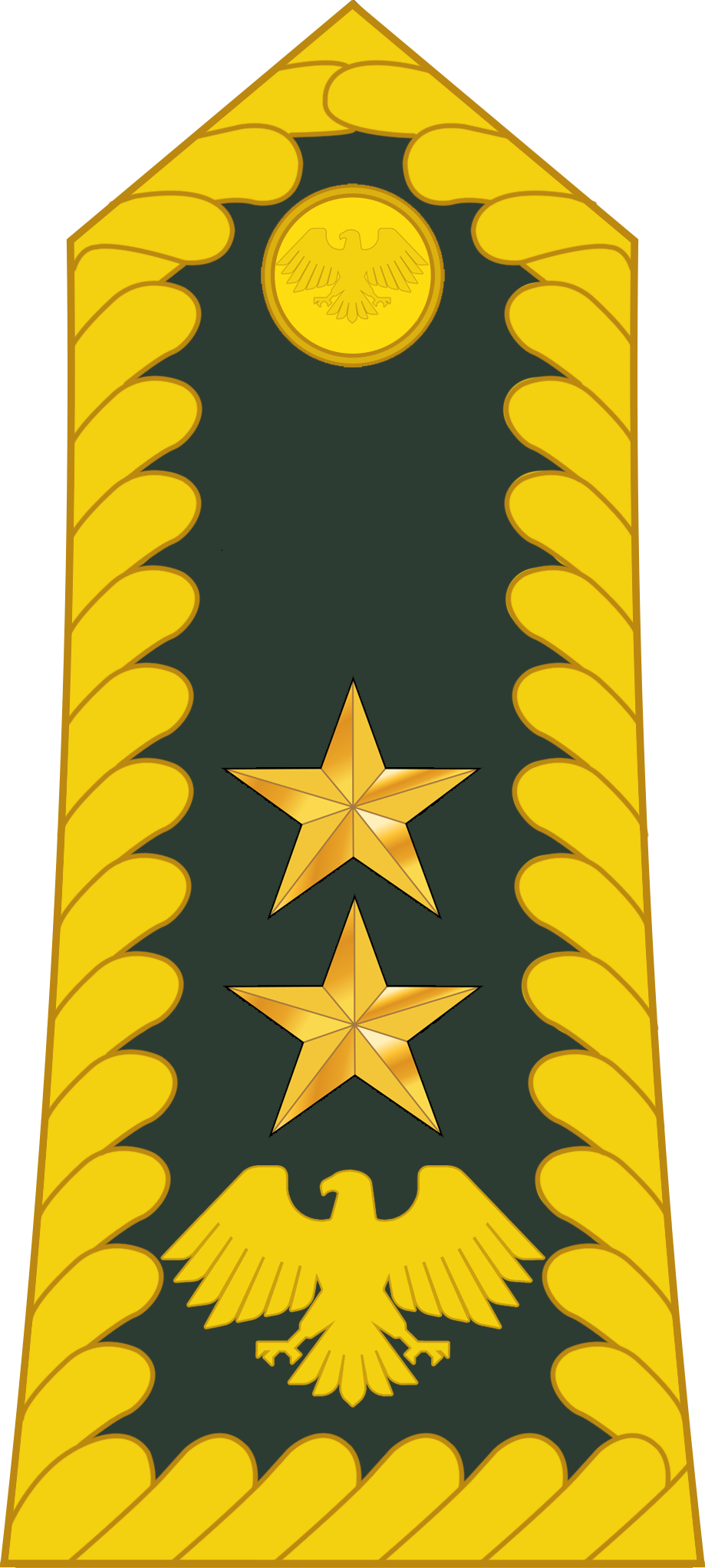
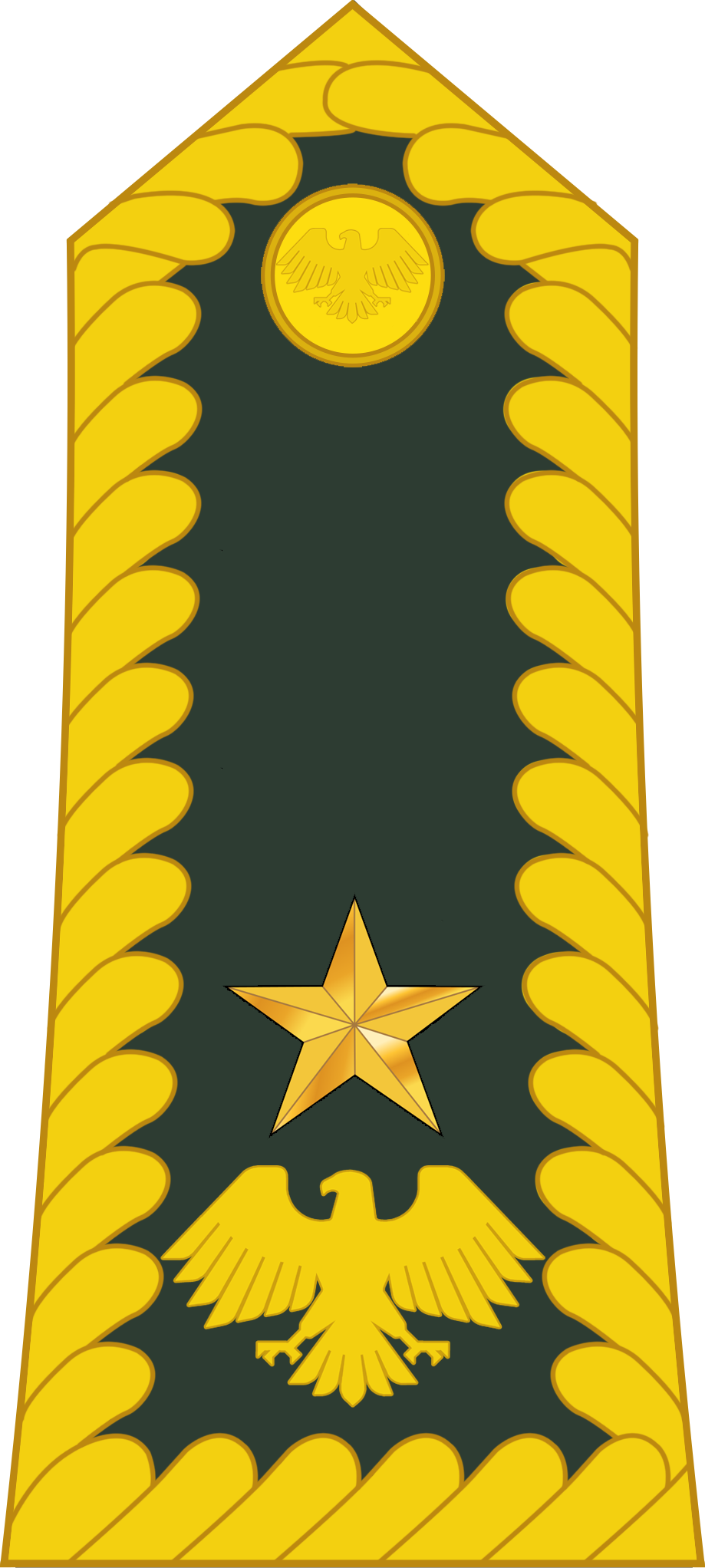
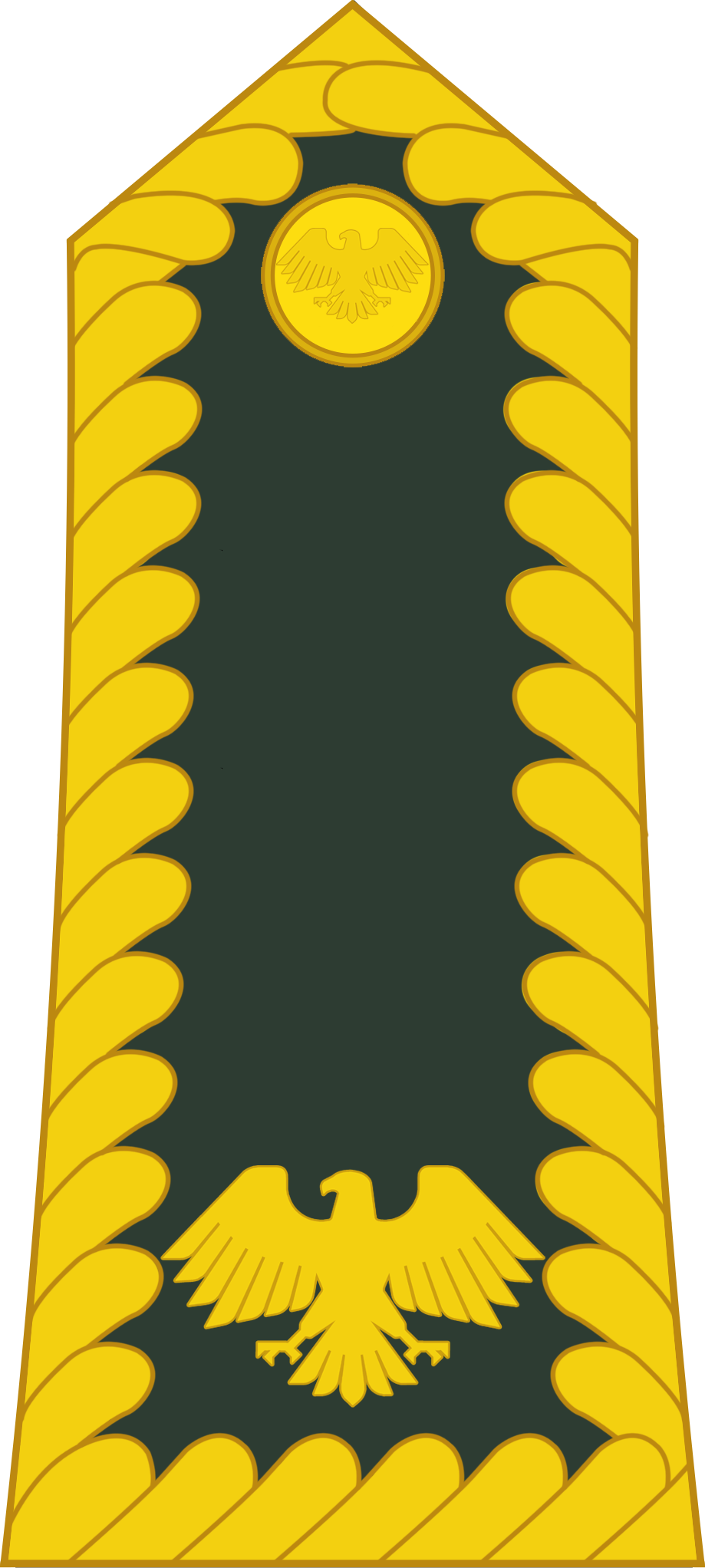
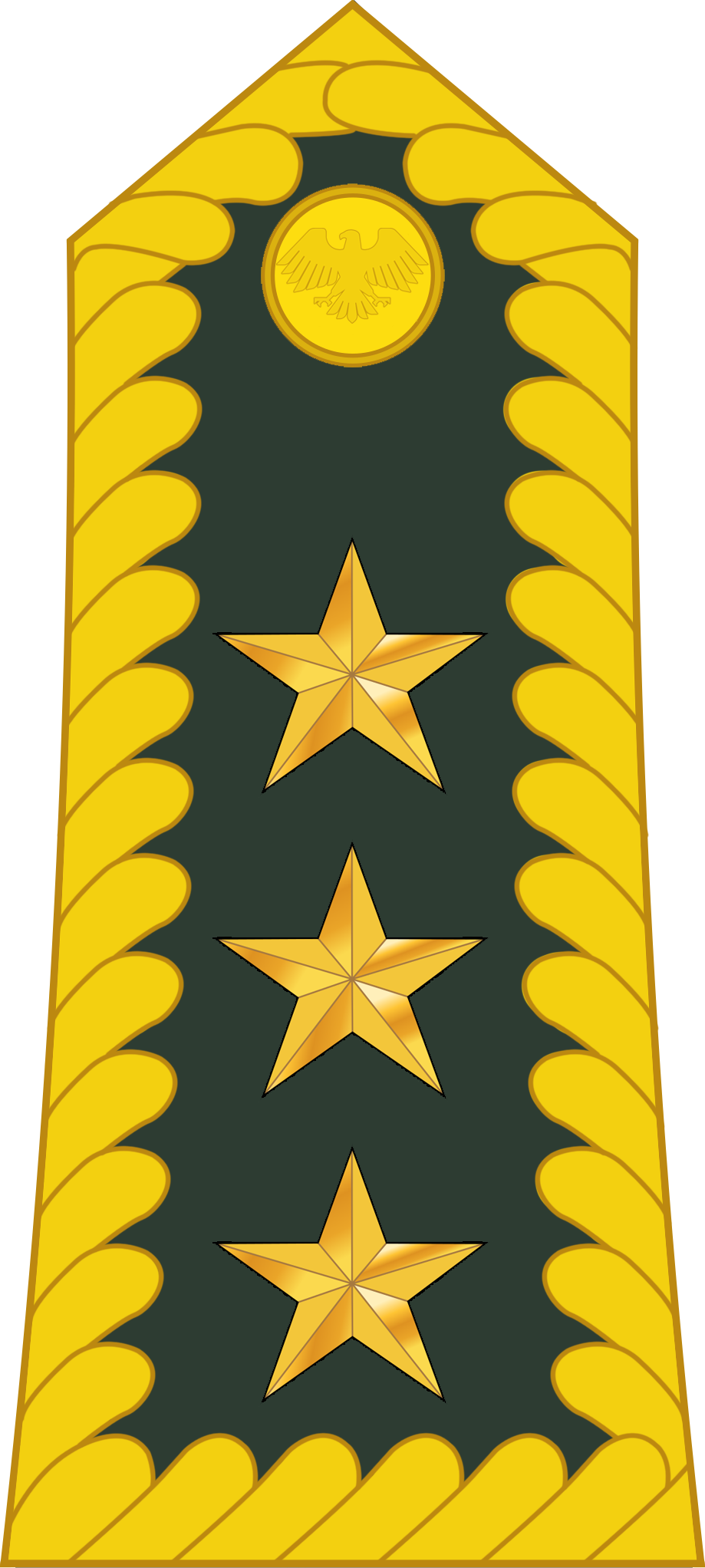
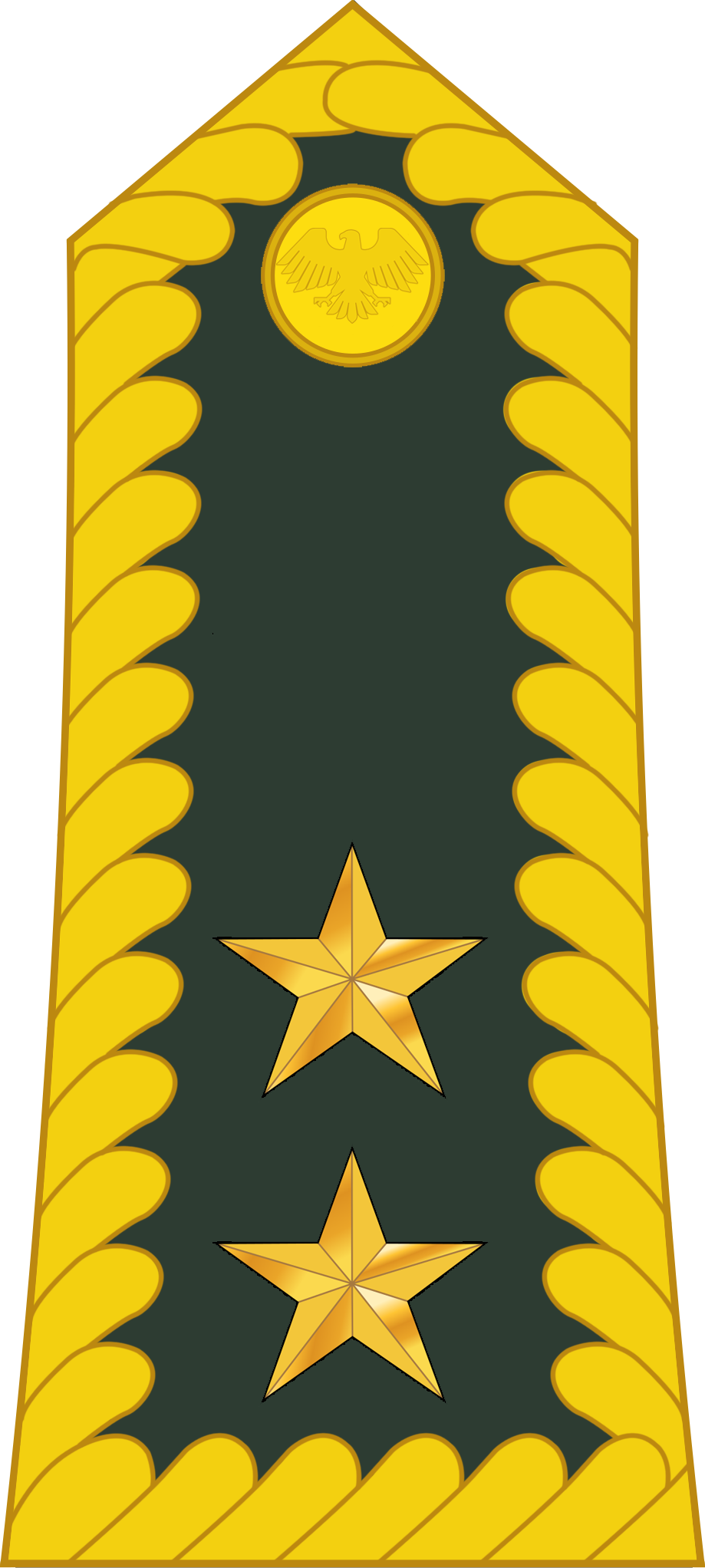
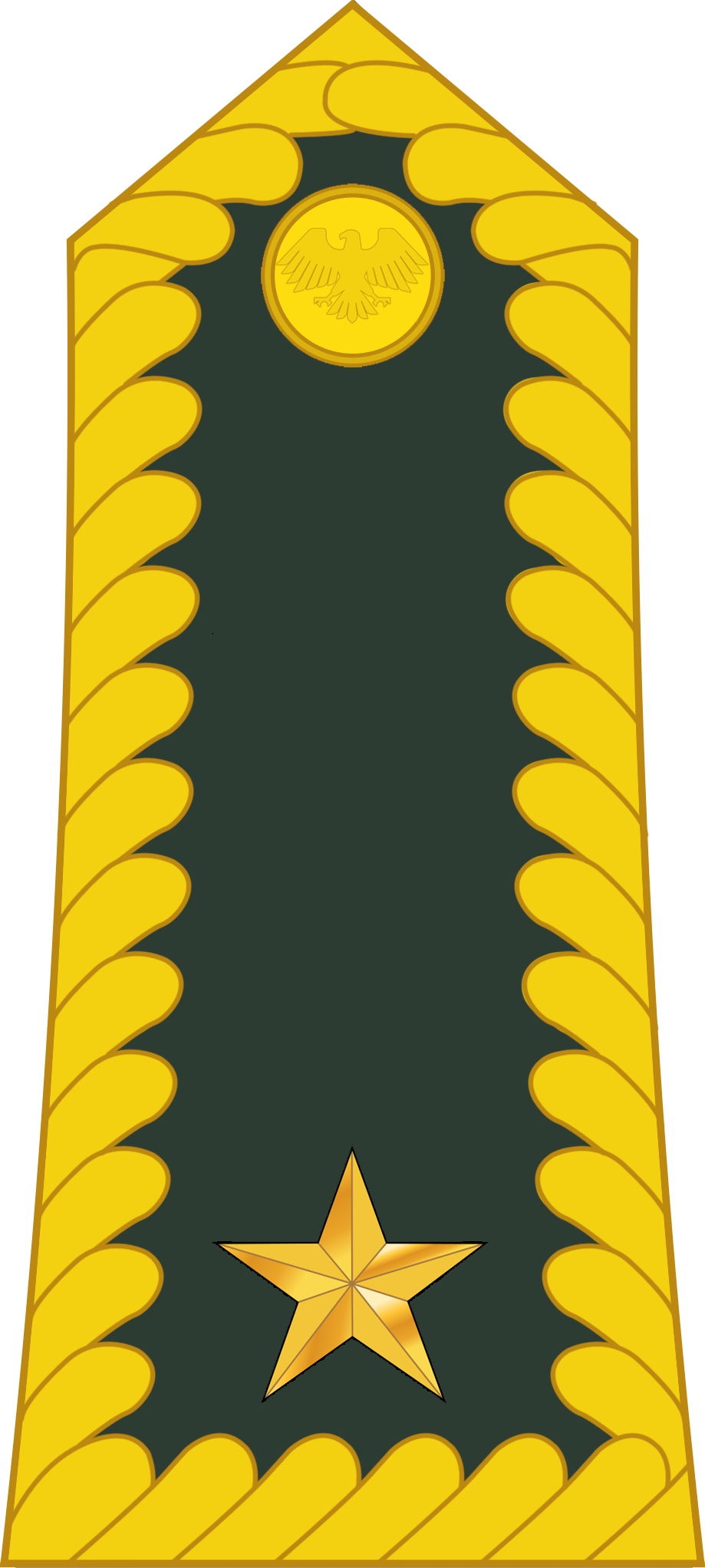
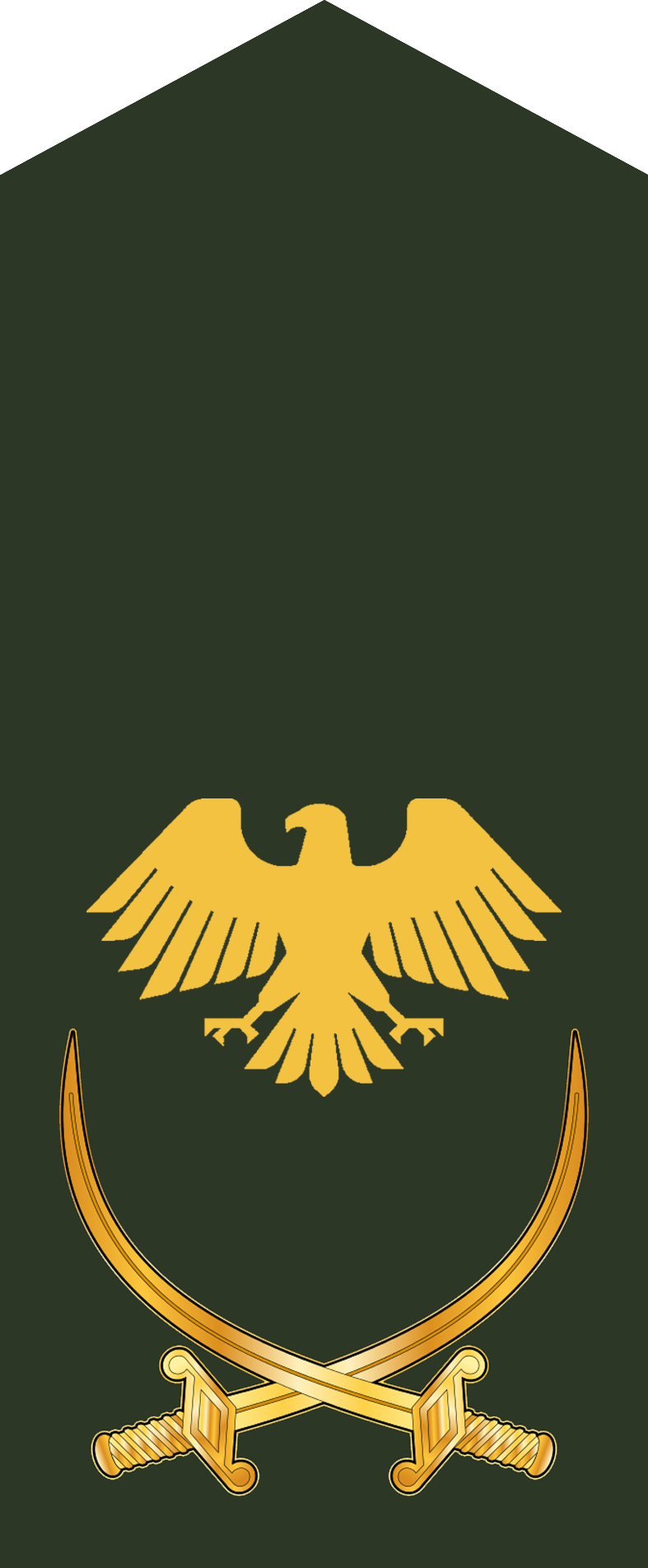
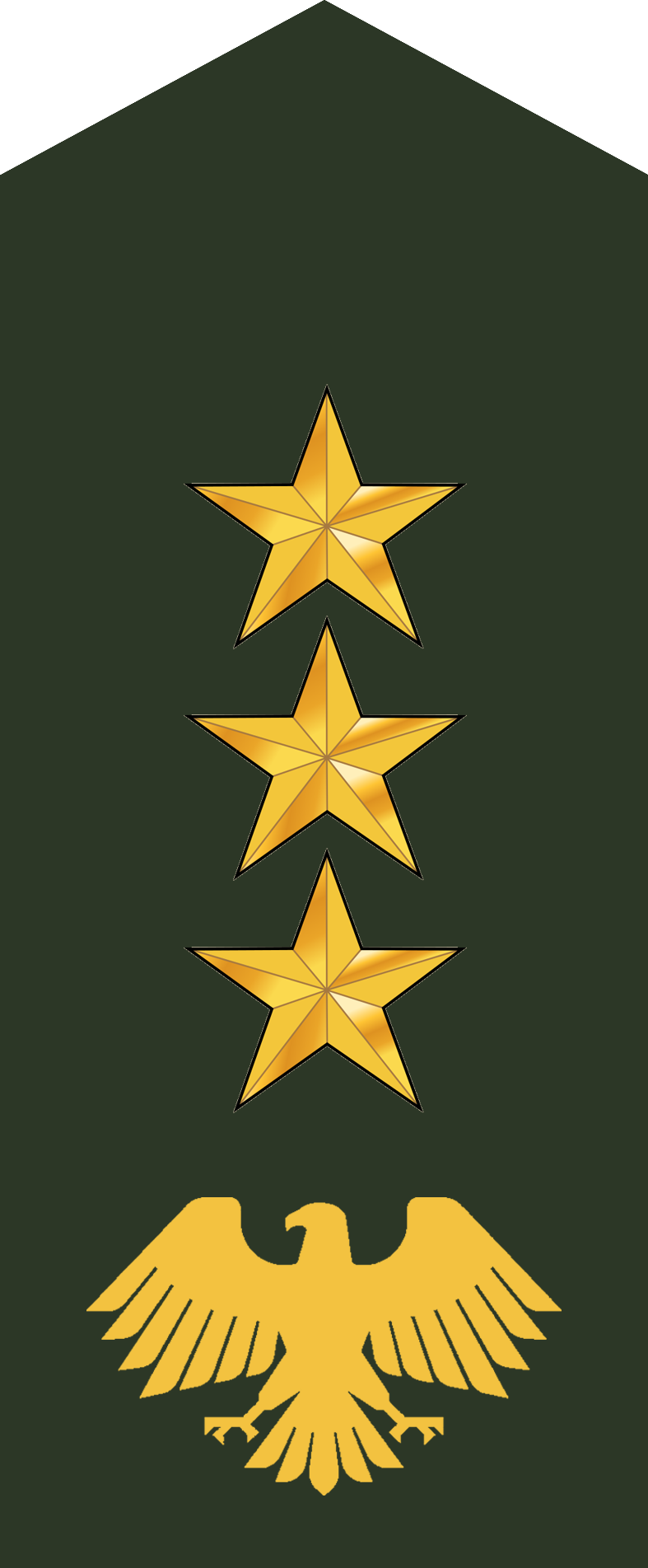
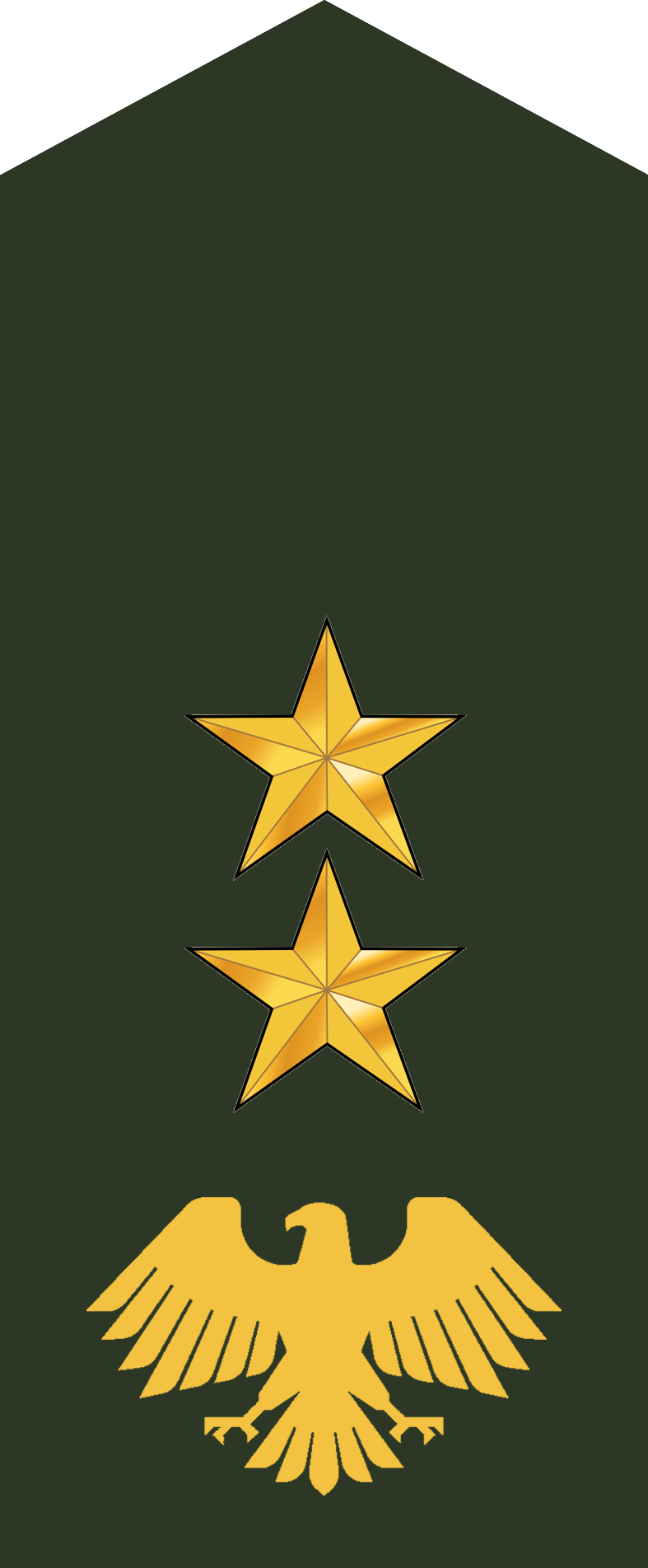
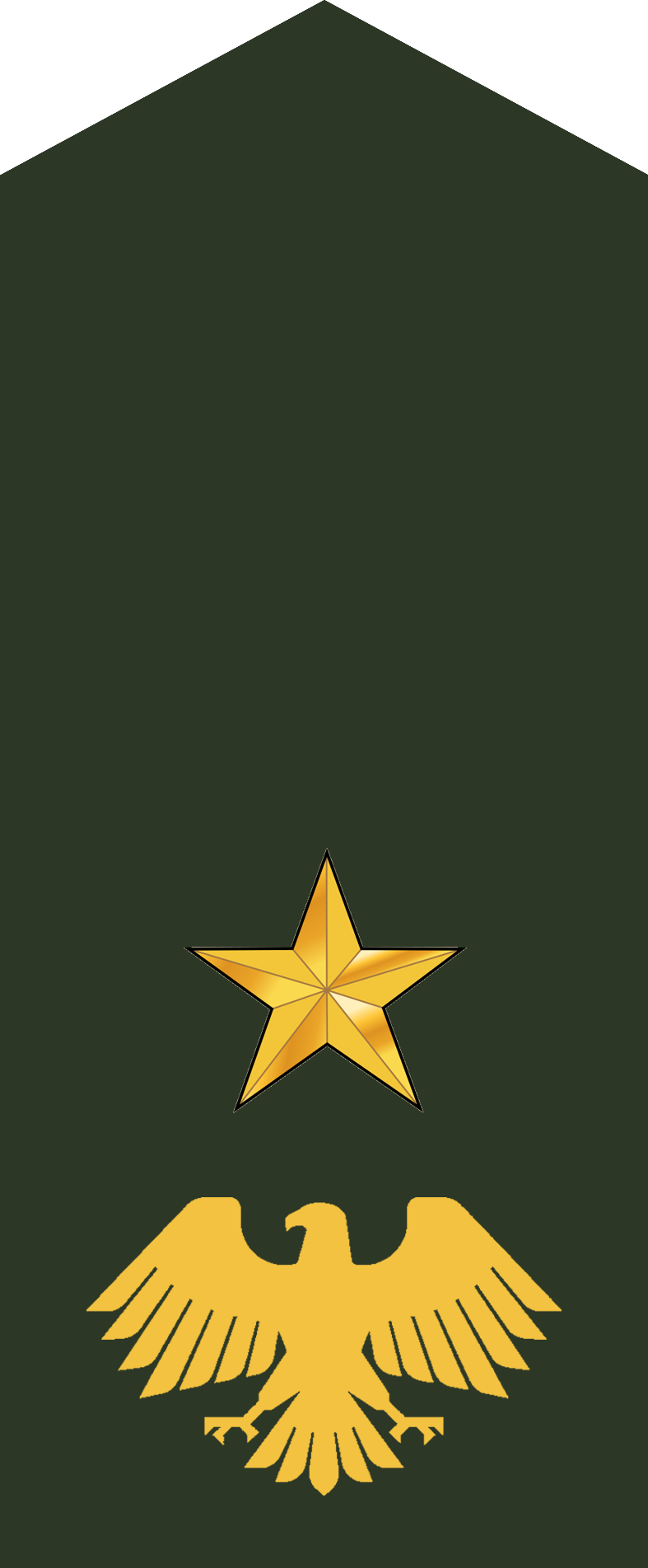
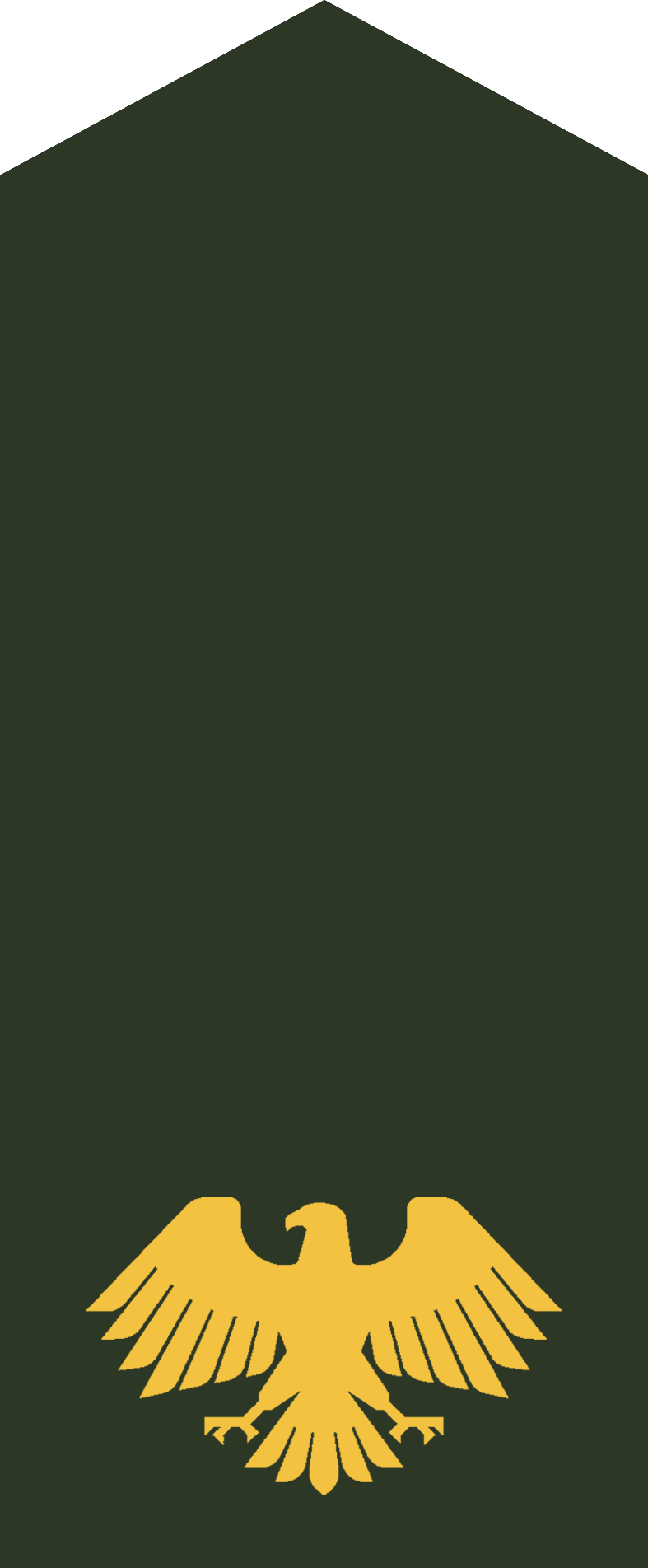
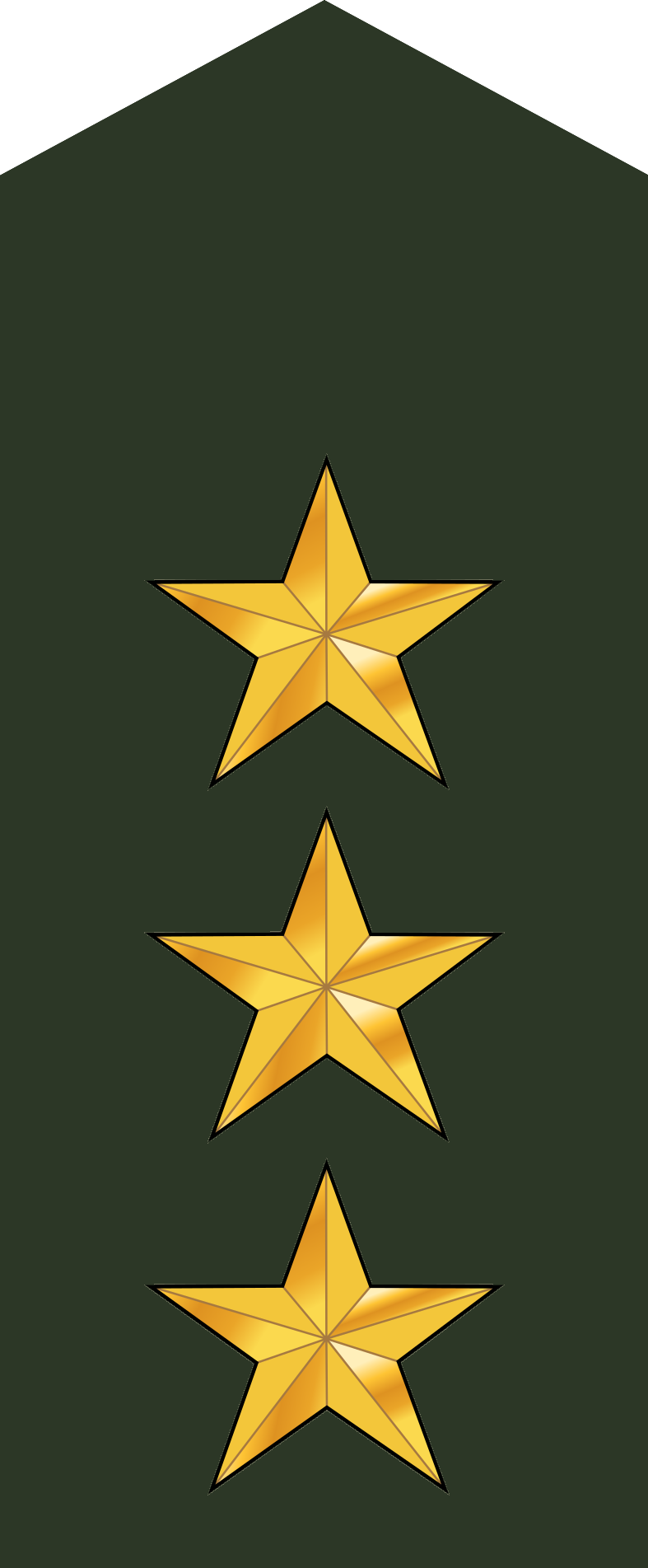
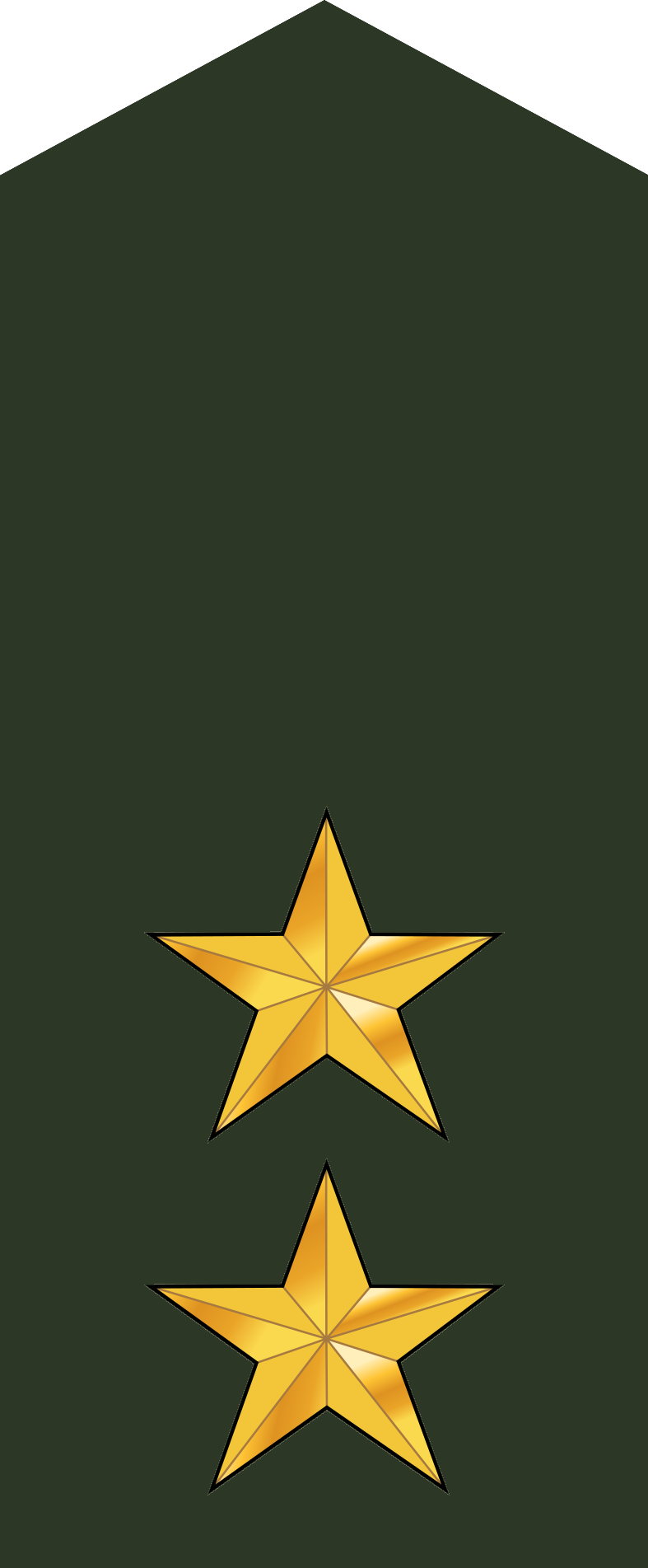
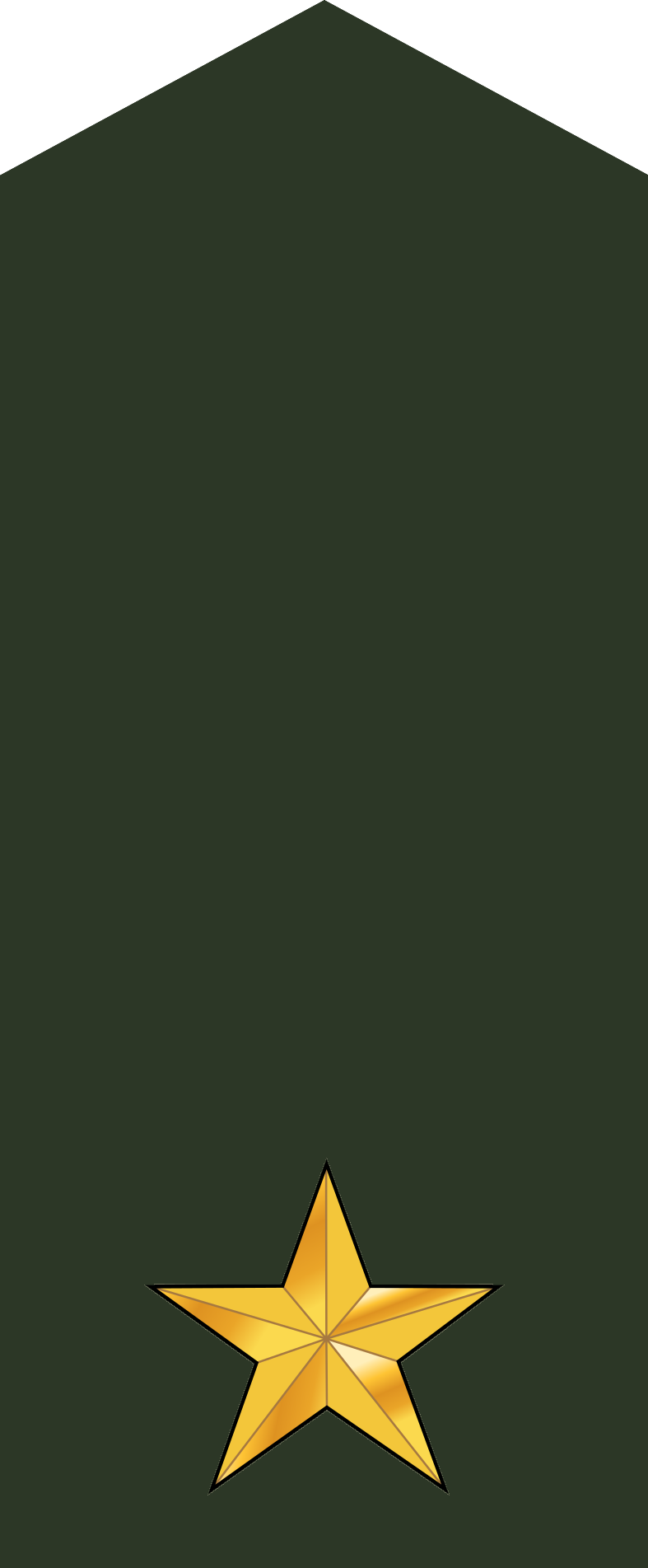
| Rank group | General / flag officers | | | | | Senior officers | | | Junior officers |
|---|---|---|---|---|---|---|---|---|---|---|---|
| Rank | فريق | عماد أول | عماد | لواء | عميد | عقيد | مقدم | رائد | نقيب | ملازم أول | ملازم |
| Romanization | Fariq | Eimad 'awal | Eimad | Alliwa' | Amid | Aqid | Muqaddam | Ra'id | Naqib | Mulazim awwal | Mulazim |
| Army combat uniform |
| Army Full dress uniform |
| Army Service dress uniform |
| Rank group | General / flag officers | | | | | Senior officers | | | Junior officers |

The rank insignia of non-commissioned officers and enlisted personnel.

| Rank group | Senior NCOs | | | | | | Junior NCOs | Enlisted |
|---|---|---|---|---|---|---|---|---|---|
| Syrian Army | | | | | | | | | No insignia |
| Syrian Army | مساعد أول; Musaeid 'awal | مساعد ثاني; Musaeid thani | مساعد; Musaeid | رقيب أول; Raqib 'awal | رقيب ثاني; Raqib thani | رقيب; Raqīb | عريف; Earif | جندي أول; Jundiun 'awal | جندي; Jundiun |

=== Awards ===
Although some twenty-five orders and medals were authorized, generally only senior officers and warrant officers wore medal ribbons. The following are some important Syrian awards: Order of Umayyad, Medal of Military Honor, the War Medal, Medal for Courage, Yarmuk Medal, Wounded in Action Medal, and Medal of 8 March 1963. The status of these awards are currently unknown.

== Chief of the General Staff of the Army ==
The Chief of the General Staff of the Army and Armed Forces (Arabic: رئيس هيئة الأركان العامة للجيش والقوات المسلحة, romanized: Rayiys hayyat al'arkan aleamat liljaysh walquaat almusalaha) is the professional head of the Syrian Armed Forces and the Syrian Army. The Chief of the General Staff and his Deputy are appointed by the President of Syria, who is the commander-in-chief of the Armed Forces. As of 2026, the Chief of the General Staff is Major General Ali Noureddine al-Naasan, appointed by President Ahmed al-Sharaa on 21 December 2024.
