= 80th Division (Syria) =

- Active: 2025 - present
- Country: Syria
- Branch: Syrian Army
- Area of responsibility: Aleppo Governorate
- Engagements: SDF–Syrian transitional government clashes (2025–2026)

Commanders
- Current commander: Ahmed Mohammed Rizk
- Deputy Brigade Commander: Muhammad Naser Tafesh
- Chief of Staff: Khaled al-Amar

The 80th Division of the Syrian Army, established under the Syrian Transitional Government following the fall of the Assad regime, is responsible for the Aleppo Governorate. The majority of the division's personnel came from the Sunni Islamist Nour al-Din al-Zenki Movement and the Turkish-backed Mu’tasim Division, with both groups being formerly part of the Syrian National Army (SNA).

== History ==
=== Background ===
The now integrated groups operated most of the time in the Aleppo area during the Syrian Civil War.

The Nour al-Din al-Zenki Movement, from which many members of the unit originate, was accused of multiple human rights violations, including a widely condemned 2016 incident involving the beheading of a child. Reports suggest that this event contributed to U.S. President Donald Trump’s decision to halt support for Syrian rebel factions during his first term.

=== After its formation ===
Social media reports suggest that the division has begun recruiting additional combatants and has conducted special forces training courses, with around 450 participants till July 2025.

The division engaged in sporadic fighting with SDF forces near the Dayr Hafir contact line in 2025.

== Structure ==
The division's commander is Ahmed Mohammed Rizk (Abu Muhammad), who previously led Nour al-Din al-Zenki until 2019 and later on joined Hay'at Tahrir al-Sham (HTS), a Sunni Islamist opposition group.

Other high-ranking members of the division include: Chief of Staff Khaled al-Amar (Abu Al-Yaman), who was a former officer in Bashar al-Assad's army and defected in 2012, Brigade Commander Mu’tasim Abbas (Abu Al-Abbas), and Deputy Brigade Commander Muhammad Naser Tafesh.

Part of the division is a special forces brigade.

== See also ==
Other Aleppo-based divisions of the Syrian Army:

- 72nd Division (Syria)
- 76th Division (Syria)
