= Shahab =

Shahab (Persian: شهاب) may refer to:

- Shahab District, a district in Qeshm County, Hormozgan Province, Iran
- Mayakovski, Armenia, a town in the Kotayk Province of Armenia, formerly called Shahab
- Shahab (missile), a class of Iranian missiles
  - Shahab-1
  - Shahab-2
  - Shahab-3
  - Shahab-4
  - Shahab-5
  - Shahab-6 (Toqyān)
