= Shahab (missile) =

Shahab (Persian: شهاب, lit. 'Meteor') is a class of short to long-range Iranian ballistic missiles, in service since 1988.

There have been six different variants:

- Shahab-1 (1987)
- Shahab-2 (1990)
- Shahab-3 (1998)
- Shahab-4
- Shahab-5
- Shahab-6 (Toqyān)
