= Ballistic missile program of Iran =

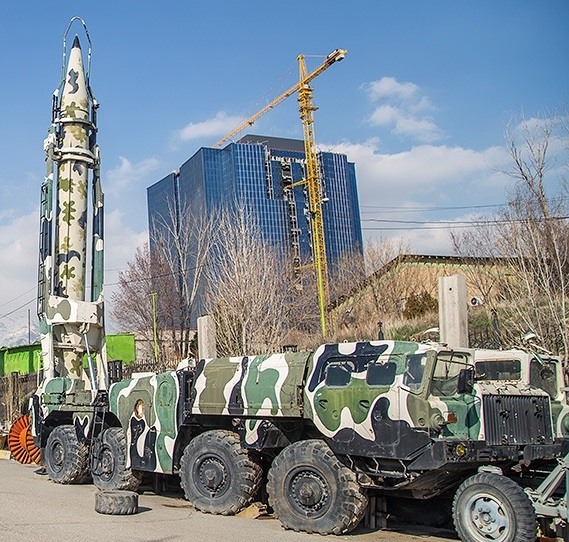
Iranian Scud missile launcher

The ballistic missile program of Iran is the largest in the Middle East and plays a key role in Iran's military and defense strategy, pursuit of regional power projection, and other geopolitical goals. Analysts assess that the Islamic Republic of Iran's varied arsenal of short-range and medium-range ballistic missiles are intended to function as "deterrence through retaliation", as an immediate response option to attacks by foreign adversaries. The missile program is also seen as a tool for enhancing the capabilities of the Islamic Republic's non-state allies in the West Asia and overall bolstering national defense capabilities.

The program aims to offset its adversaries' conventional military superiority, particularly given that international sanctions against Iran since the 1979 revolution have hampered its ability to maintain and upgrade its air force. The Iranian government has adopted a "deterrence by punishment" approach to counter threats by enemies and rivals such as Saudi Arabia, Israel, and the United States. Concerns about the ballistic program's potential connection to Iran's nuclear ambitions, especially as a means for delivery of nuclear warheads, have led to international scrutiny and sanctions.

The program is primarily led by two state entities: the Aerospace Industries Organization (AIO) and the Islamic Revolutionary Guard Corps (IRGC), which oversee several subordinate missile entities and front companies that procure needed ingredients, components, and equipment from foreign suppliers. The Self-Sufficiency Jihad Organization (SSJO) is tasked with advancing the country's ballistic missile capabilities.

In February 2026, Iranian Foreign Minister Abbas Araghchi stated that Iran deliberately limits the range of its missiles to 2,000 km (1,200 mi). On 20 March, Iran launched two missiles toward the British base on Diego Garcia, around 4,000 km (2,500 mi) from Iran, according to U.S. officials. Iranian officials denied this.

== History ==
Iran's missile program originated during the 1980–88 Iran–Iraq War as a means to deter Iraqi Scud attacks during the War of the Cities phase of the conflict and to compensate for its lack of modern air power amid U.S. sanctions. In 1984, Iran obtained its first contingent of ballistic missiles (20 Soviet "Scud-B" SRBMs) from Libya and subsequently procured Scud derivatives and launchers from North Korea and China. Hassan Tehrani Moghaddam, regarded as the father of Iran's missile program, sought expertise and blueprint designs from North Korea. He designed missiles with an operational range of up to 2000 km to target Israel.

By the 1990s, Iran had reverse-engineered the Scud-B to produce the Shahab-1 (a range of 330 km) and Shahab-2 (a range of 500km) missiles, as well as Zelzal and Fateh short-range rockets. In the 2000s, Iran introduced longer-range systems (e.g. the liquid-fueled Shahab-3 MRBM, based on the Scud-C) and began testing two-stage solid-fueled designs (e.g. the Sejjil-2 MRBM). Key milestones include the public debut of Shahab-3 in 1998 (a range of ∼1,300 km) and the solid-fuel Sajjil in 2008. By 2010, Iran was unveiling newer variants (e.g. Qiam-1 in 2010, Zolfaghar in 2016) and integrating missile tests with its growing space launch program. Throughout this period the program's drivers included deterrence of Israel and Arab states of the Persian Gulf, asymmetrical warfare doctrine, and prestige, as summed up by experts: "Iran's ballistic missile programme… is an important element of military doctrine, a means of deterrence, and a tool of statecraft".

The 2010s were marked by prioritization of improved accuracy and development of precision-guidance technology over increased range. The Fateh-110 in this period underwent many modifications to improve its accuracy and range, resulting in a number of derivatives – Zolfaghar, Fateh-313, Kheibar Shekan, etc.

In February 2025, Iran appeared to be rearming its missile program. A ship carrying 1,000 tons of sodium perchlorate, a chemical crucial for solid propellant production in missiles, arrived at the Iranian port of Bandar Abbas. This shipment could facilitate the production of propellant for about 260 Kheibar Shekan missiles or around 200 Martyr Hajj Qassem Soleimani ballistic missiles. The shipment highlights Iran's continuing dependence on international sources for critical materials.

In June 2025, during the Twelve-Day War, The Economist reported that 6% of 500 missiles fired by Iran towards Israel hit built-up areas.

Iran intensified efforts to rebuild its ballistic missile program following the losses it sustained during the 2025 Twelve-Day War, and after the war, production of ballistic missiles quickly resumed. Iran was reported to have replenished its stockpile of approximately 2,000 missiles, while it was said to have made significant developments in the capabilities of its missiles. Iran's reported rearmament occurred despite the reinstating of United Nations sanctions restricting arms transfers and ballistic missile activity through the JCPOA "snapback" mechanism in late September 2025. The sanctions were intended to prevent Iran from undertaking any activity related to ballistic missiles capable of delivering nuclear weapons, including delivery of materials which could contribute to such activity.

European intelligence sources and a CNN investigation report that since the reimposition of sanctions, Iran received multiple large shipments of sodium perchlorate from China, totaling approximately 2,000 tons, delivered to the port of Bandar Abbas. This was in addition to an earlier shipment of 1000 tons delivered to Iran from China in February 2025. Sodium perchlorate, while not explicitly banned by the sanctions, falls under the broader prohibition of providing "items, materials, equipment, goods, and technology" which could contribute to Iran's missile program, and is a precursor in the production of ammonium perchlorate, the primary oxidizer in solid-fueled rocket motors used in Iran’s medium-range ballistic missiles, whose provision to Iran is prohibited explicitly.

Reports that the shipments were facilitated through a network of Chinese suppliers, front companies, and cargo vessels, some of which were already under U.S. sanctions, were corroborated by ship-tracking data and satellite imagery. The reports included evidence of repeated voyages between Chinese ports and Iran and, in some cases, deliberate efforts to obscure vessel movements. Analysts assess that the quantities delivered could allow the production of five hundred missiles, which would demonstrate a determined attempt by Iran to replenish depleted stockpiles.

On 22 December 2025, Iran reportedly conducted ballistic missile tests over Tehran, Isfahan, Mashhad, Khorramabad and Mahabad. Initially, IRGC aligned media notified the public about the tests, while citing various videos of missile deployment surfacing from many locations, however state-run IRIB News Agency denied the launches had ever taken place, stating that the white trail was "an aircraft contrail at high altitude" and that the images were "inaccurate".

During the 2026 Iran War, ballistic missiles were used to target U.S. bases in the Middle East as well as targets in neighboring Arab states, as well as Israel. The IDF and the US began a campaign of airstrikes targeting the ballistic missile launchers to limit the ability of Iran to launch missiles. As a result the number of daily ballistic missile launches was reduced by 86% after the first week of the war. There have also been four instances of Iranian ballistic missiles entering Turkish airspace during the war, all of which were downed by NATO air defenses. Iran has denied targeting Turkey with ballistic missiles, with Turkish officials suggesting that the missiles may have intended to target Cyprus but veered off course.

Iran reportedly fired missiles towards the UK-US base on Diego Garcia, part of the Chagos Islands, which is around 4,000km (2,500 miles) from Iran, overnight between 19 and 20 March. However, an Iranian official later denied the claim. The Spokesperson for the Ministry of Foreign Affairs of Iran Esmail Baghaei called it a false flag operation and accused Israel of launching the missiles at the base.

== Types ==
Iran's ballistic missile arsenal is estimated to include somewhere between 3000 and 4000 missiles prior to the 2026 Iran war. This large inventory comprises a diverse array of short-range ballistic missiles (SRBMs), with a range of 300–1000 km, and medium-range ballistic missiles (MRBMs) with a range of 1000–3000 km. According to a statement made by Iranian Parliament member of the Commission on National Security and Foreign Policy, Amir Hayat Moghadam, all of Europe, and in particular Britain, France and Germany are in range of Iranian MRBMs, while major US cities such as Washington and New York, beyond range at approximately 10,000 km away, may be targeted by missiles launched from the sea.

In addition, Iran has outfitted various types of its missiles with cluster munition capabilities to disperse small bomblets from the head of the missile. The munitions are capable of carrying up to 5 kg (11 lb) of explosive material and released at high altitudes, which are released during the missile's flight at a high altitude and disperse over a radius of several miles. According to analysts, most of Iranian missiles equipped with cluster munitions are able to accommodate up to 24 bomblets, though the more advanced Khorramshahr missile can carry up to 80 such munitions. Iran has deployed such outfitted missiles extensively during both the 2025 and 2026 wars against Israel, in what observers consider an effort to evade the latter's multi-layered air defense system and exhaust the supply of interceptors. Iran's use of this tactic to target adversaries has been described as "indiscriminate" by human rights organizations such as Human Rights Watch and Amnesty International, given that the cluster munitions do not aim for precise targets and randomly disperse. In the past two wars with Israel, both organizations issued reports criticized Iran for launching cluster bombs into densely-populated civilian areas, calling them violations of international humanitarian law and possible war crimes.

=== Table ===
Ballistic missiles of Iran
Model	Range class	Range (km)	Fuel type	Number of stages	Year deployed
Shahab-1	Short-range ballistic missile	350	Liquid fuel	1	1985
Shahab-2	Short-range ballistic missile	750	Liquid fuel	1	1997
Qiam 1	Short-range ballistic missile	750	Liquid fuel	1	2017
Fateh-110	Short-range ballistic missile	300	Solid fuel	1	2004
Fateh-313	Short-range ballistic missile	500	Solid fuel	1	2015
Raad-500	Short-range ballistic missile	500	Solid fuel	1	
Zolfaghar	Short-range ballistic missile	750	Solid fuel	1	2017
Dezful	Medium-range ballistic missile	1,000	Solid fuel	1	2017
Shahab-3	Medium-range ballistic missile	1,300	Liquid fuel	1	2003
Ghadr-110	Medium-range ballistic missile	1,600	Liquid fuel	1	
Emad	Medium-range ballistic missile	1,800	Liquid fuel	1	2015
Khorramshahr	Medium-range ballistic missile	2,000	Liquid fuel	1	In development
Fattah-1	Medium-range ballistic missile	1,400	Solid fuel	1 plus MaRV	2023
Fattah-2	Medium-range ballistic missile	1,500	Solid fuel	1 plus MaRV	
Haj Qasem	Medium-range ballistic missile	1,400	Solid fuel	1	2020
Qassem Bassir	Medium-range ballistic missile	1,200	Solid fuel	2	
Kheibar Shekan	Medium-range ballistic missile	1,450	Solid fuel	1	
Sejjil	Intermediate-range ballistic missile	4,000	Solid fuel	2	2012

=== Short-range ballistic missiles ===
300–1,000 km range

- Shahab-1 and Shahab-2 – Liquid-fueled missiles with ranges of 350 km and 750 km, respectively.
- Qiam-1 – A liquid-fueled SRBM with a range of 750 km and a smart targeting system.
- Fateh-110 family – A series of solid-fueled missiles, including:
  - Fateh-110 (300 km range)
  - Fateh-313 (500 km range)
  - Zolfaghar (750 km range)
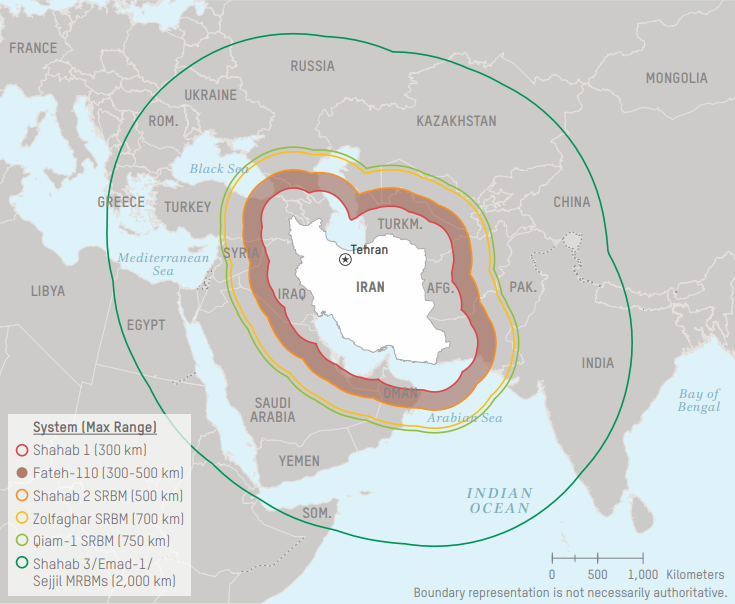
    Iranian Ballistic Missile Ranges (2019)
- Hormuz series – Anti-ship SRBMs with ranges of about 300 km.

=== Medium-range ballistic missiles ===
1,000–3,000 km range

- Shahab-3 variants – Liquid-fueled MRBMs with ranges between 1,200 km and 2,100 km.
- Qasem Basir – An improved Haj Qasem variant, with better precision and evasion mechanisms and a range of 1,200 kilometers.
- Haj Qasem – A solid-fueled MRBM with an estimated range of 1,400 km.
- Kheybar shekan – A precision-strike ballistic missile with a range of 1,450 km.
- Fattah-1 and Fattah-2 – Hypersonic missiles reportedly capable of Mach 13 speeds, with ranges of 1,400 km and 1,500 km, respectively.
- Etemad, meaning "trust" in Persian, capable of traveling 1,700 kilometers.
- Ghadr-110 – A liquid-fueled MRBM with a range of 2,000–3,000 km.
- Sejjil – A two-stage, solid-fueled MRBM with a range of 2,000 km.
- Khorramshahr – A liquid-fueled MRBM that can carry multiple warheads, with a range of 2,000 km.
- Emad – An improved Shahab-3 variant with better precision and a range of 2,000 km.

=== Intermediate-range ballistic missiles (disputed) ===
3,000–5,500 km range

- Unknown Type

According to an Amir Hayat-Moghaddam, a member of the Iranian Parliament's National Security Committee, all European countries are in range, while U.S. cities could be struck if the missiles were launched from offshore naval platforms.

== Stock ==
Iran was estimated to possess more than 3,000 missiles total (all ranges) before the 2025 Twelve-Day War. Iran manufactured hundreds of SRBMs (e.g. Fateh-110/M-600) for Hezbollah. Iran has reportedly supplied ballistic missile components to its ally in Yemen, the Houthis, to the extent that it possess dozens of ballistic missiles capable of hitting both Saudi Arabia and Israel. Iran-backed Iraqi militias have received "a couple of dozen" short-range ballistic missiles.

Iran employs mobile transporter erector launchers (TELs) (e.g. multi-axle trucks) for most missiles, allowing dispersion. Aerial photos show Iranian TELs carrying Zelzal, Qiam and Sejjil missiles on 6x6, 8x8, or 10x10 chassis. Iran also maintains hardened facilities (often underground) for missile assembly and storage. Notably, satellite imagery reveals vast new complexes at Khojir and Modarres near Tehran – expanded missile production and storage sites with numerous protective berms and bunkers.

Iran was estimated to have over 1,000 missiles at the beginning of the 2026 Iran war ceasefire. However, Western intelligence later assessed that Russia had resupplied Iran with enough missiles to reach about three-quarters of the amount it had before the war.

== Key development sites and organizations ==
Aerospace Industries Organization (AIO) is based in Tehran and is a key subsidiary of the Defense Industries Organization (DIO) which oversees the Iranian missile program, and is involved in the procurement of missile components, such as turbine engines, sealing compound, and hermetic connectors. A 2001 report suggested that a Research and Development center near Tehran was using Russian SS-4 missile technology for the development of the Shahab-4 missile, which, according to western experts, could serve as a long-range weapon system.

Bank Sepah - Iran's fourth largest state-owned bank, described as "the financial linchpin of Iran’s missile procurement network" by the US Treasury Department. Through Bank Sepah, Iran has acquired multiple missile related items from China and the North Korean ballistic missile exporter, KOMID.

Defense Industries Organization (DIO) - A main subsidiary of the Ministry of Defense and Armed Forces Logistics (MODAFL), controls dozens of state-owned defense contractors and front companies, both directly and through the AIO. The DIO has orchestrated hundreds of illicit operations for the procurement of ballistic missile production components from China, through a web of domestic false-flag enterprises and front companies abroad.

Fajr Industrial Group - A subsidiary of the AIO. According to the US Treasury Department, it "is involved in the production and acquisition of precision equipment for missile guidance and control systems".

Imam Khomeini Space Center - Formerly the Semnan Spaceport, the original site consists of two launch pads: one medium-sized with a collapsible umbilical tower and one large launch pad with a mobile gantry tower. In February 2009, the Omid satellite was launched into orbit with the two-stage Sefir SLV from the center. In 2010 an additional launch pad was constructed approximately 3km from the original site, and it included a mobile gantry tower, an umbilical tower, two flame trenches, support tunnels, and four large lightning towers. At a height of 45m, the gantry tower far exceeded the needs of the SLVs in use at the time, pointing to Iranian intentions to test new designs for SLVs.

Isfahan Missile Complex - Iran's largest missile production and assembly facility, where solid and liquid fuels and missile components are manufactured, and Shahab, Chinese HY-2 Silkworm and M-class missiles are assembled. A 2001 report suggested that a Research and Development center near Isfahan was using Russian SS-4 missile technology for the development of the Shahab-4 missile, which according to western experts could serve as a long range weapon system.

Ministry of Defense and Armed Forces Logistics (MODAFL) - The unified organization for Iran's defense industries, formed through the merging of the Defense Ministry and the IRGC Ministry in 1989. The MODAFL is the overarching organization directing the AIO and giving it operational control over Iran's ballistic missile program.

Parchin Military Complex (Missile) - A large research and development complex, allegedly involved in the production of chemical weapons, and in conducting experiments with laser enrichment technology and high explosive testing for nuclear weapons. Some experts suspect the complex is also utilized for the production of liquid-fueled ballistic missiles.

Semnan Missile Complex - A ballistic missile production facility and test range, built with substantial Chinese assistance and located in the vicinity of the Iranian Space Center and associated launch facilities. The facility also produces artillery rockets, as well as the Shahab-1 missiles and possibly Zelzal rockets.

Shahid Bakeri Industrial Group (SBIG) - Produces a range of solid-fueled rockets and ballistic missiles, including the Fateh-110, and according to Christoph Bluth, it produced long-range solid-fueled missiles with the assistance of Russian engineers. According to ISIS, in the mid 1990s the group assumed responsibility for the production of solid fuel in Iran.

Shahid Hemmat Industrial Group (SHIG) - Through cooperation with Russia, China, North Korea and possibly Ukraine, the group is responsible for the Iranian ballistic missile programs, including those of the Shahab-3 and Ghadr missiles. The SHIG was damages during the June 2025 airstrikes, though its operational status is unknown.

Shahroud Missile Test Site - An IRGC facility for the development, testing and launching of solid-fueled missiles and SLVs. Two military satellites, the Noor-1 and the Noor-2, were launched from the site, in 2020 and 2022 respectively, and additional SLVs and satellites were launched from the facility since then. The site was damaged during the June 2025 airstrikes.

Shiraz Missile Plant - Reportedly, a research, development and production facility for the fuel and components of the Shahab-1/Scud-B missiles. The site was damaged during the June 2025 airstrikes, though its operational status is unknown.

== Bases ==
Iran has numerous ballistic-missile bases spread across the country, with many underground, including:

1. Khorramabad Underground Missile Base: Located in the Lorestan province, this base is known to have the most missile silos in the country.
2. Imam Ali Missile Base: One of two Iranian silo missile bases, large enough to store and deploy Shahab-3 missiles as well as mobile erector-launchers. The base consists of a storage facility and a missile launch facility, and is heavily guarded.
3. Tabriz Missile Base: Iran's second silo missile base, located in northwestern Iran, potentially threatens parts of Eastern and Central Europe, with an approximate launch area of approximately 50,000 square kilometers. According to various reports, the site contains hardened silos and transporter erector launchers (TEL) for the Shahab-1, Shahab-2 and potentially Shahab-3 missiles.The site was damaged during the June 2025 airstrikes, though its operational status is unknown.
4. Kenesht Canyon Underground Base: Situated in the Kermanshah province.
5. Panj Pelleh Underground Base: Also located in the Kermanshah province.
6. Bakhtaran Missile Base: Located in western Iran, this base is strategically positioned for potential launches against targets in Israel, the Gulf States, and Europe. It houses an underground facility, two missile storage areas and two launch pads.
7. Haji Abad Missile Base: A suspected new hardened launch site near Haji Abad, though its exact location is not disclosed.
8. Undisclosed Gulf Location: On January 18, 2025, the IRGC navy unveiled an underground naval missile base at an undisclosed location in the Gulf region34.
9. Southern Iran Coastal Areas: On February 2, 2025, the IRGC navy unveiled another underground missile base in the coastal areas of southern Iran.

Iran has missile bases in all provinces and cities throughout the country, with many at depths of 500 meters underground, and impenetrable to the United States Air Force's most powerful bunker-buster bomb, the GBU-57A/B MOP. The locations of many of these bases remain classified for security reasons. Iran continues to expand its missile production capabilities, with recent unveilings of underground "missile cities" showcasing its growing arsenal.

== Nuclear potential ==
Several of Iran's ballistic missiles have the range and payload capacity to carry a nuclear warhead, should Iran choose to develop one. This has drawn international concern and sanctions.

The Shahab-3, based on North Korean technology, is one of Iran's most sophisticated ballistic missiles. With a range of about 1,300 kilometers, it could carry a nuclear warhead. The Ghadr-1, a Shahab-3 variant, extends this range to almost 2,000 kilometers. A 2019 study declared the original Shahab-3 to be "designed to be nuclear capable".

The Khorramshahr, Iran's most advanced liquid-fuel ballistic missile, is also considered to be designed for potential nuclear capability. Its wider conical nose (1.5 meters in diameter) could accommodate a nuclear device.

Iran's medium-range ballistic missiles, such as the Sejjil and Emad, with ranges between 1,500 and 2,500 kilometers, could be adapted to carry nuclear warheads. These missiles cover all of the Middle East and parts of Europe, making them a concern for regional and international security.

While the 2017 Joint Comprehensive Plan of Action was designed to block Iran's pathways to nuclear weapons, concerns remain about the potential dual-use nature of Iran's missile technology.

The international community has expressed concerns about Iran's missile program, particularly its potential connection to Iran's nuclear ambitions. UN Security Council Resolution 2231 previously forbade Iran from activities involving "missiles designed to be nuclear capable," but these restrictions expired in October 2023.

According to the Institute for International Political Studies (ISPI), sources in Tehran reported that in October 2025, Iranian Supreme Leader Ali Khamenei had authorized the development of miniaturized nuclear warheads for ballistic missiles, despite denials issued at earlier dates. The report stated that although such warheads would require uranium enriched to 90%, this could be achieved in a matter of weeks if Iran were to process its existing stockpile of 441 kg of 60% uranium with its advanced IR-4 and IR-6 centrifuges; and circulated accounts indicate the existence of an ultra-secret enrichment program at one of Iran's covert nuclear sites, to which the IAEA has not been given access.

== Use in combat ==
On April 13–14, 2024 Iran fired approximately 120 ballistic missiles towards Israel as part of operation "True Promise". Israel claimed that the interception rate was 99%, but Israeli media outlet Maariv claimed that the interception rate was 84%.

On 1 October 2024, Iran launched about 200 ballistic missiles as part as operation "True Promise II". Most of the missiles were intercepted according to the Israeli army. According to the Palestinian Authority's state-run news agency Wafa, one Palestinian was killed in Jericho by an Iranian missile.

During the Twelve-Day War in June 2025, Iran launched between 500 to 550 ballistic missiles at Israel. According to Israeli authorities, 31 landed in populated areas or critical infrastructure sites. The missile attacks killed 29 Israelis.

Between 28 February and 20 April 2026, in response to joint US and Israeli attacks, Iran launched 1,471 ballistic missiles towards Israel, Jordan, Qatar, Kuwait, Bahrain, Saudi Arabia, the UAE, Oman, and Turkey, according to data by the Israeli think tank Institute for National Security Studies (INSS). Following the implementation of a temporary ceasefire on 8 April, a comprehensive tracker by NBC found that Iran launched roughly 1,372 ballistic missiles at Persian Gulf countries, with the following breakdown: 563 at the UAE; 265 at Kuwait; 215 at Qatar; 194 at Bahrain; and, 135 at Saudi Arabia. (The analysis emphasized that the Kuwait figure is underreported, as Kuwaiti authorities did not publicize the attack figures between 2 and 5 March). Following the ceasefire, the Israeli military reported that a total of 650 ballistic missiles were fired from Iran towards Israeli territory, more than half of which carried cluster munitions. A total of 20 citizens and foreign nationals were killed in Israel by ballistic missiles. In addition, an Iranian ballistic missile might have been responsible for killing four Palestinian women in a direct hit on the southern West Bank town of Beit Awwa, in the Hebron district.

== See also ==
- Defense industry of Iran
- Islamic Revolutionary Guard Corps Aerospace Force
- Nuclear program of Iran
- Iranian underground missile bases
- Project Flower
