= Islamic Revolutionary Guard Corps Aerospace Force =

Aerospace service branch of Iran's Islamic Revolutionary Guard Corps

- نیروی هوافضای سپاه پاسداران انقلاب اسلامی
- Founded: 17 September 1985; 41 years ago
- Country: Iran
- Allegiance: Islamic Republic of Iran
- Type: Strategic missile force, air force, space force
- Role: Strategic deterrence, aerial warfare, anti-aircraft warfare, space warfare
- Size: ≈15,000 (2020)
- Part of: Islamic Revolutionary Guard Corps
- Garrison/HQ: Tehran
- Engagements: Iran–Iraq War; Syrian civil war; Iranian intervention in Syria; Operation Night of Power; Operation Strike of Muharram; War in Iraq (2013–2017); Iranian intervention in Iraq; Iran–PJAK conflict; Western Iran clashes; 2018 Koy Sanjaq missile strike; 2019–2021 Persian Gulf crisis; Shoot-down of an American drone; Operation Martyr Soleimani; 2022 Erbil missile attacks; Attacks on US bases during the Middle Eastern crisis; 2024 Iranian missile strikes in Iraq and Syria; 2024 Iran–Pakistan conflict; 2024 Iranian missile strikes in Pakistan; 2024 Iran–Israel conflict; April 2024 Iranian strikes on Israel; October 2024 Iranian strikes on Israel; Twelve-Day War; 2026 Iran war

Commanders
- Current commander: Brigadier General Majid Mousavi
- Commander of the Space Command: Brigadier General Ali Jafarabadi

Insignia
- Roundel

- Fin flash

- Ceremonial flag

Aircraft flown
- Attack: Su-22M4/UM3K, Chengdu F-7Ms
- Helicopter: Mi-17
- Trainer: Embraer EMB 312 Tucano, MFI-17 Mushshak
- Transport: Il-76, An-74, Harbin Y-12, Falcon 20

The Islamic Revolutionary Guard Corps Aerospace Force, officially known as the Islamic Revolutionary Guard Corps Air and Space Force (IRGCASF; Persian: نیروی هوافضای سپاه پاسداران انقلاب اسلامی, romanized: niru-ye havâfazây-e sepâh-e pâsdârân-e enghelâb-e eslâmi, acronymed in Persian as NEHSA), is the strategic missile, air, and space force of the Islamic Revolutionary Guard Corps (IRGC). It was renamed from the IRGC Air Force to the IRGC Aerospace Force in 2009.

Besides operating military aircraft alongside its counterparts in the Islamic Republic of Iran Air Force, the IRGC Aerospace Force is also responsible for space warfare through its military satellite program. Most importantly, it oversees the ballistic missile program of Iran, which includes the deployment and operation of an arsenal of intermediate-range, and medium-range ballistic missiles with ranges over 2,000 kilometers, considered one of the cornerstones of the Islamic Republic's strategic deterrence and defense doctrine.

== Aviation forces ==
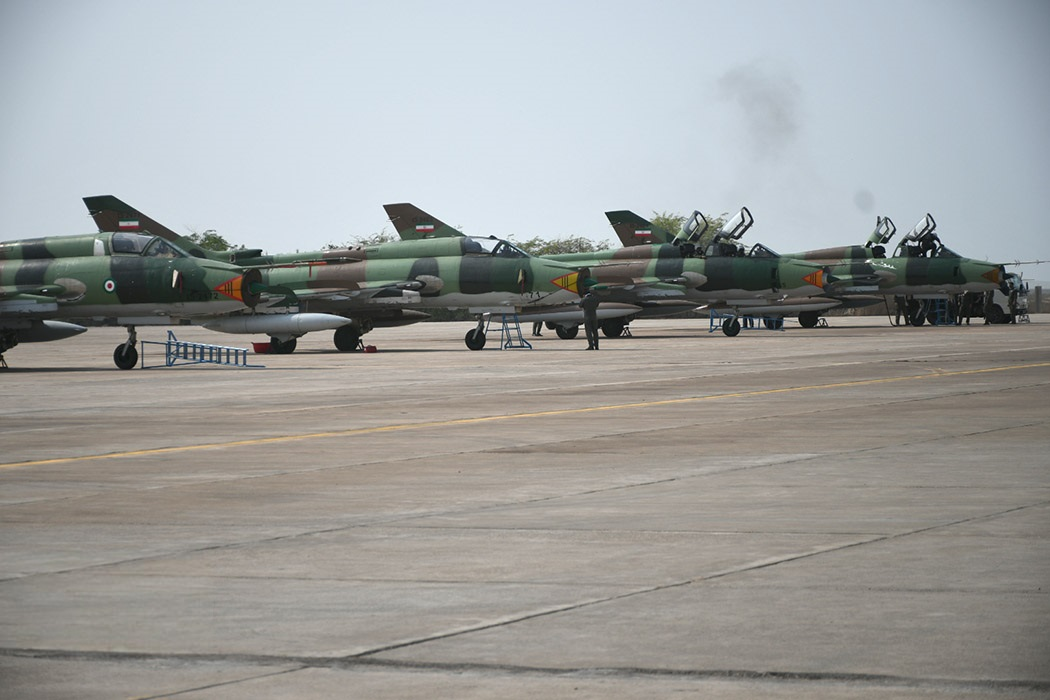
The Su-22M4 fleet

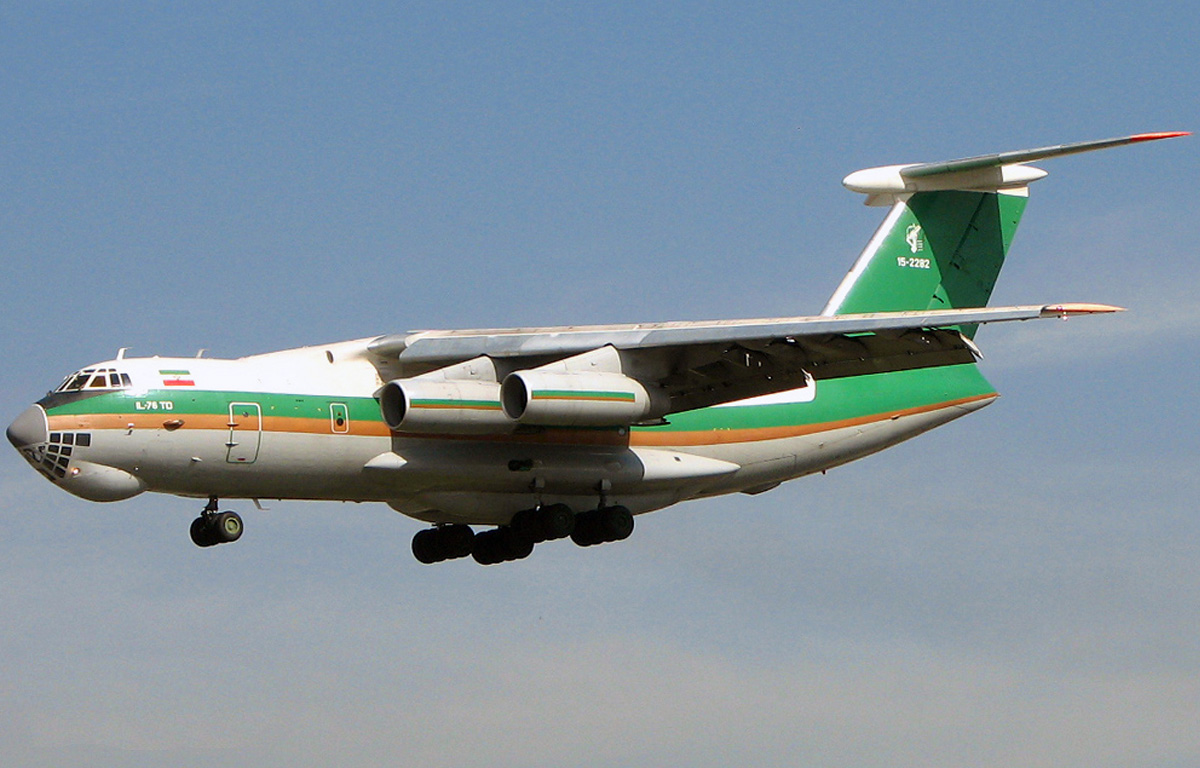
An Ilyushin Il-76 in flight

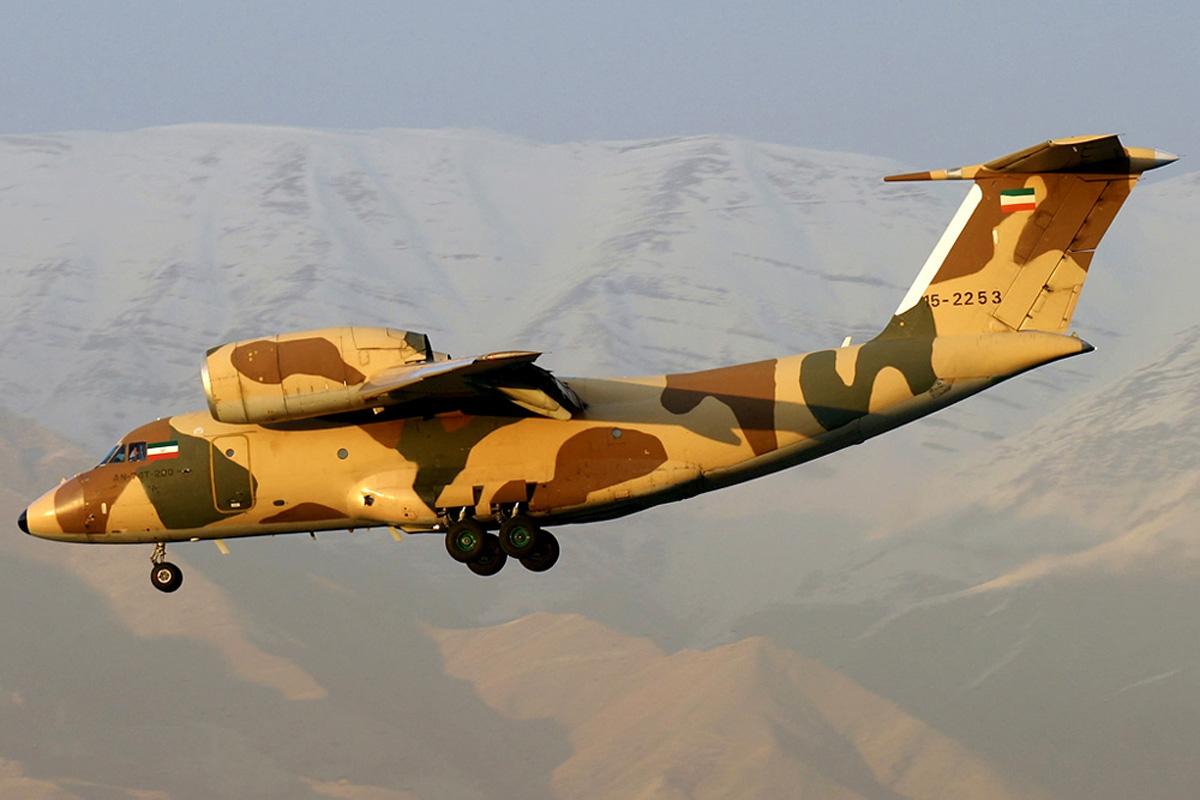
An An-74TK-200

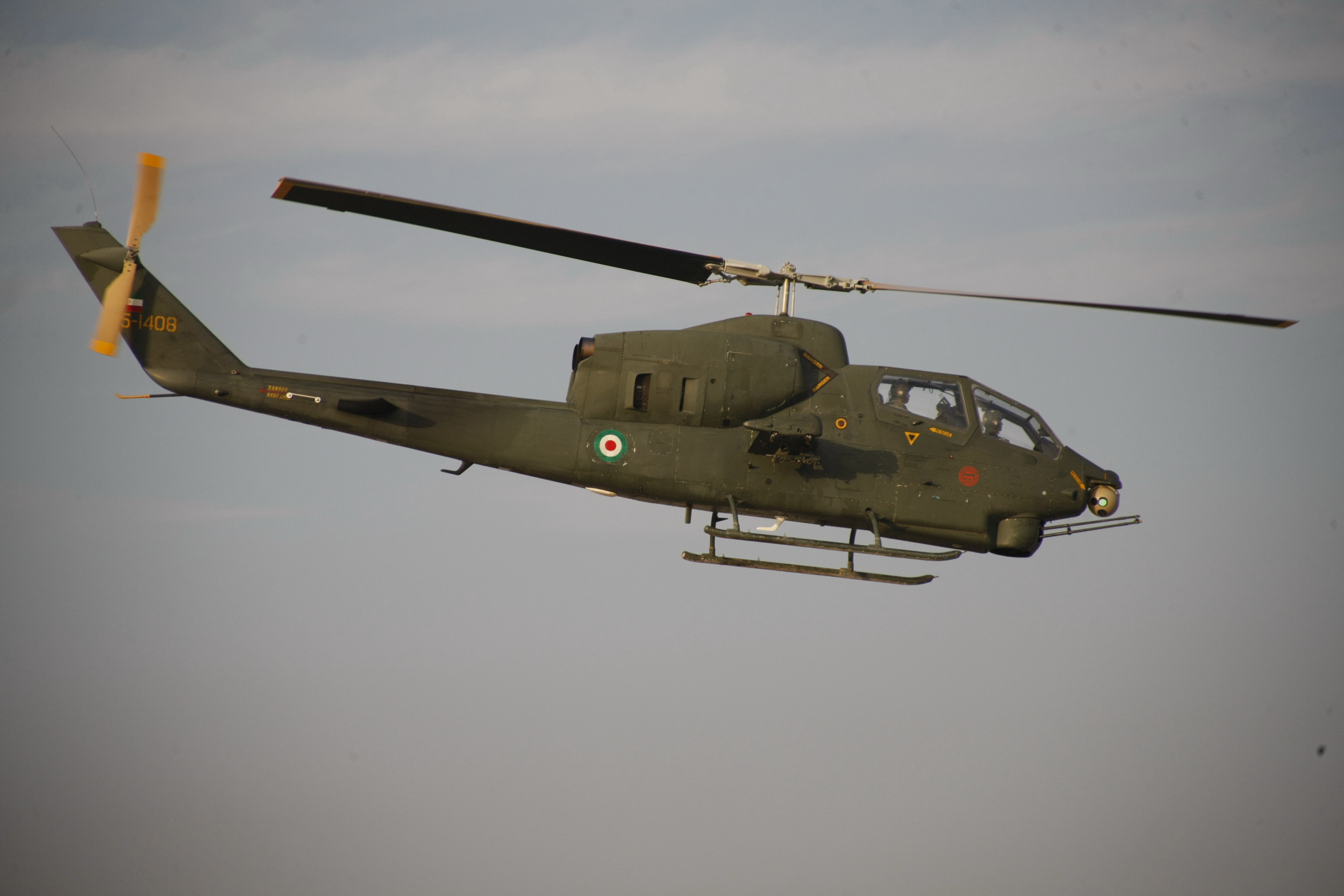
A Toufan helicopter

Most American public sources disagree and argue on which aircraft are operated by the AFAGIR. The Washington Institute for Near East Policy said in 2005 that "[t]he backbone of the IRGCAF consists of ten Su-25 Frogfoot attack aircraft, including seven flown from Iraq to Iran during the 1991 Gulf War, kept airworthy with the help of Georgian technicians, although reports indicate that all of the IRGCAF aircraft have been sold to Iraq in July 2014, to increase the latter's for CAS and COIN for fighting against ISIS capabilities. All of them were replaced by Su-22", all of them flown from Iraq to Iran during 1991 Gulf War, and around forty EMB-312 Tucanos".

The Washington Institute said that the IRGCAF maintained thirty Y-12 and Dassault Falcon 20 light transports, as well as MFI-17 Mushshak and Super Mushshak trainers, and locally built Ababil and Mohajer reconnaissance unmanned aerial vehicles (UAVs).

The AFAGIR also operates a sizable rotary-wing force consisting of around twenty Mi-171 helicopters for transport and armed assault roles, and a large transport force out of Shiraz, equipped with around fifteen ex-Iraqi Il-76s, originally operated by the IRIAF, and twelve An-74TK-200 transports. Scramble backs up this picture in general, reporting An-74s, An-14s, and Su-22 at Tehran Mehrabad, Chengdu F-7Ms at Zahedan, while saying that MFI-17s were often reported at Zahedan incorrectly, and Il-76 AEW variants at Shiraz Shahid Dastghaib International Airport, while saying that they might be based at Mehrabad.

Other later writings make no mention of Il-76s. Anthony Cordesman of the Center for Strategic and International Studies, writing in August 2007, said only the AFAGIR "may operate Iran's 10 EMB-312 Tucanos", and that it "seems to operate many of Iran's 45 PC-7 training aircraft" as well as Pakistani-built training aircraft at a school near Mushshak, "but this school may be run by the regular air force". He said that reports of the Revolutionary Guards operating F-7s did not seem to be correct.

Cordesman noted claims of the AFAGIR building gliders for use in unconventional warfare, saying that they would be unsuitable delivery platforms, but could at least carry a small number of weapons. However the attached reference was a 1996 Reuters report, making the sources for such assertions extremely thin. The IISS Military Balance 2007 makes no mention of aircraft, referring only to the Shahab 1, 2, and 3 missiles.

In October 2009, it was announced that its name has been changed from IRGC Air Force to IRGC Aerospace Force.

In February 2014, Jane's announced that the Barani missile system had been tested. This system is a laser-guided air-to-surface missile which releases submunitions: "new generation of long-range ballistic missiles carrying multiple re-entry vehicle MIRV payloads". The UN Panel of Experts identified it as a variant of the Shahab (Ghadr 1) and questioned its alleged multiple re-entry vehicle capability, suggesting instead that it carried sub-munitions.

The Bina missile, which can be carried aloft and is able to be ground-launched from a rail car, was also revealed at the time.

=== Current aircraft inventory ===
Aircraft	Origin	Type	Variant	In service	Notes
Combat aircraft
Sukhoi Su-22	Soviet Union	attack	Su-22M4/Su-22UM3K	7	
Transport
Antonov An-74	Soviet Union	transport	TK-200/T-200	8	
Dassault Falcon 20	France	VIP transport		1	
Harbin Y-12	China	transport		11	
Helicopters
Mil Mi-17	Russia	transport/armed		17	
Trainers
Embraer EMB 312 Tucano	Brazil	trainer		15	
PAC MFI-17 Mushshak	Pakistan	trainer		25	

==== Aircraft on loan ====
The Aerospace Force owns some civilian aircraft. As of 2017, 6 Russian-made transport planes were reportedly leased to Pouya Air, and 2 more Embraer ERJ-145ER jets acquired.

== Missile forces ==
Targets hit by IRGCAF missiles between 2017 and 2024:
United States military & diplomatic locations
ISIL
Kurdish insurgents

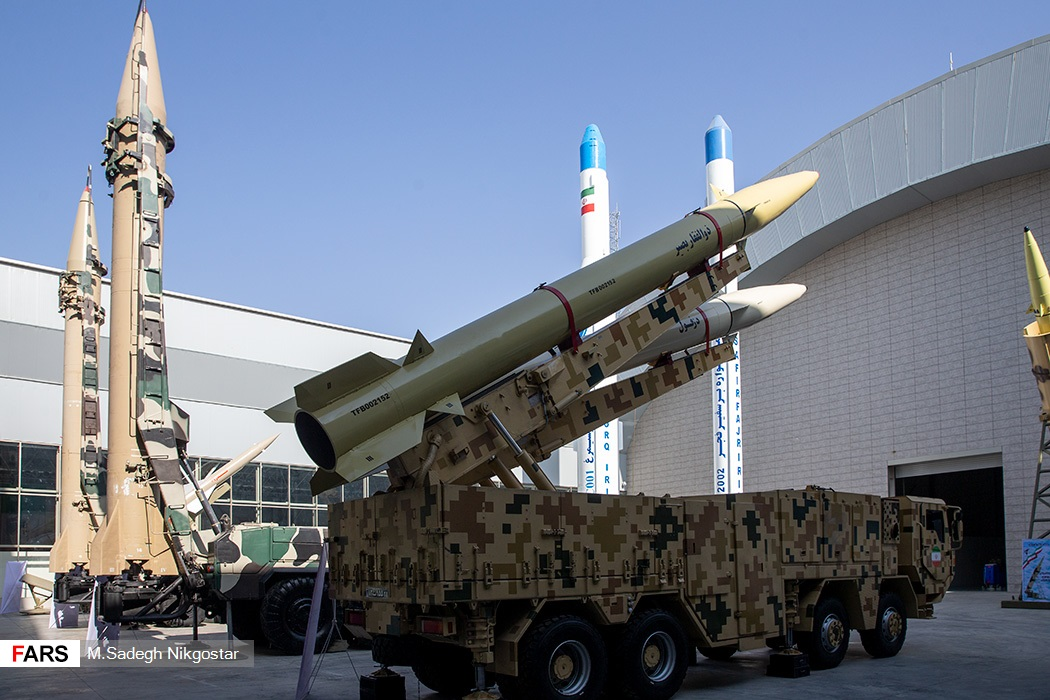
IRGC Aerospace Force missiles at an exhibition in Tehran, showing the Shahab-1, Shahab-2, Zolfaghar and Dezful missiles

The IRGC Aerospace Force is responsible for the operation of Iran's surface-to-surface (SSM) missile systems. In 2006 it was mentioned by John Negroponte that Iran held the largest inventory of ballistic missiles in the Middle East. In August 2013, Ahmad Vahidi former defense minister of Iran said that his country was ranked sixth in the world in missile production. It is claimed to operate several thousand short- and medium-range mobile ballistic missiles, including the Shahab-3/3B with a range of up to 2,100 kilometers, which is the mainstay of Iran's strategic deterrent.

This puts even NATO members Turkey, Greece, Bulgaria and Romania within striking range, if fired from Western Iran. If Iran ever produces nuclear weapons, they fall under the direct supervision of the Aerospace Force. Iran says that it has no intention of producing nuclear weapons. However, there is evidence which points otherwise. A stolen Iranian laptop, containing over 1000 pages of calculations, simulations and modifications required to make the Shahab-3 nose cone capable of carrying a nuclear warhead, was obtained by U.S. intelligence in 2004 and shown to IAEA officials. Additionally, an interview with Alireza Assar, an Iranian physicist formerly tied with the Iranian ministry of defense, revealed the existence of a military nuclear program whose goal was "to produce enough HEU (Highly Enriched Uranium) to enable the regime to produce nuclear weapons". Iran's continuous lack of transparency regarding their nuclear program has resulted in much suspicion regarding its intentions.

According to the testimony of John Negroponte in 2006, Iran's ballistic missile development, together with its enhancement of the navy is largely for the projection of its military power, with the goal of dominating the Gulf region and maintaining its ability to deter and retaliate against adversaries, including the United States. Additional reasons for the indigenous development of missiles may include the regime's intent to showcase its technological advancements, to intimidate and deter neighboring countries, and to reduce its reliance on precarious foreign supplies, particularly from North Korea.

The independent production of missiles in Iran can be traced back to at least 1997, when the country obtained missile plans and production components from Russia and began constructing missile production facilities, including the two tunnels for housing Scud missiles at Kuh-e-Padri, located along the Persian Gulf between Bandar Abbas and Bushehr. Additionally, Iran received assistance from China in the construction of a ballistic missile plant and test range east of Tehran, a production facility near Semnan, and the acquisition guidance technology and precision machine tools. Iran's largest missile production facility, the complex near Isfahan, was built with North Korean and potentially Chinese assistance as the main assembly site for Scud-B missile kits from North Korea.

In May 2013, Iran's Ministry of Defense and Logistics delivered a massive number of missile TELs to IRGC AF, "Iranian television footage showed at least 26 TELs lined up in two rows for the event, which marked their purported delivery to the Islamic Revolution Guards Corps (IRGC) Aerospace Force, which operates the country's ballistic missiles", according to the report by IHS Jane's.

Any Iranian long-range intermediate-range ballistic missile or intercontinental ballistic missile would require an extraordinarily effective guidance system and level of reliability to have any real lethality with conventional warheads, even if it could be equipped with a functional GPS guidance platform. It would probably require nuclear warheads in order to compensate for critical problems in accuracy, reliability, and warhead lethality.

In June 2020, Iranian admiral Hossein Khanzadi said that Iran would start producing indigenous supersonic cruise missiles equipped with turbofan engines soon.

Ballistic missiles of Iran
Model	Range class	Range (km)	Fuel type	Number of stages	Year deployed
Shahab-1	Short-range ballistic missile	350	Liquid fuel	1	1985
Shahab-2	Short-range ballistic missile	750	Liquid fuel	1	1997
Qiam 1	Short-range ballistic missile	750	Liquid fuel	1	2017
Fateh-110	Short-range ballistic missile	300	Solid fuel	1	2004
Fateh-313	Short-range ballistic missile	500	Solid fuel	1	2015
Raad-500	Short-range ballistic missile	500	Solid fuel	1	
Zolfaghar	Short-range ballistic missile	750	Solid fuel	1	2017
Dezful	Medium-range ballistic missile	1,000	Solid fuel	1	2017
Shahab-3	Medium-range ballistic missile	1,300	Liquid fuel	1	2003
Ghadr-110	Medium-range ballistic missile	1,600	Liquid fuel	1	
Emad	Medium-range ballistic missile	1,800	Liquid fuel	1	2015
Khorramshahr	Medium-range ballistic missile	2,000	Liquid fuel	1	In development
Fattah-1	Medium-range ballistic missile	1,400	Solid fuel	1 plus MaRV	2023
Fattah-2	Medium-range ballistic missile	1,500	Solid fuel	1 plus MaRV	
Haj Qasem	Medium-range ballistic missile	1,400	Solid fuel	1	2020
Qassem Bassir	Medium-range ballistic missile	1,200	Solid fuel	2	
Kheibar Shekan	Medium-range ballistic missile	1,450	Solid fuel	1	
Sejjil	Intermediate-range ballistic missile	4,000	Solid fuel	2	2012

=== Short range missiles ===
==== Solid fuel program ====
The foundations for this were laid with the Oghab and Shahin-II missiles. These would lead the way for a number of other rocket artillery systems including Fajr-3, Nazeat and Zelzal. The initial effort in this area relied heavily on technical help from the People's Republic of China in the form of assembly and manufacturing contracts during 1991 and 1992. Iran was quick to surpass the Chinese level of assistance and became self-sufficient.

===== Bina =====
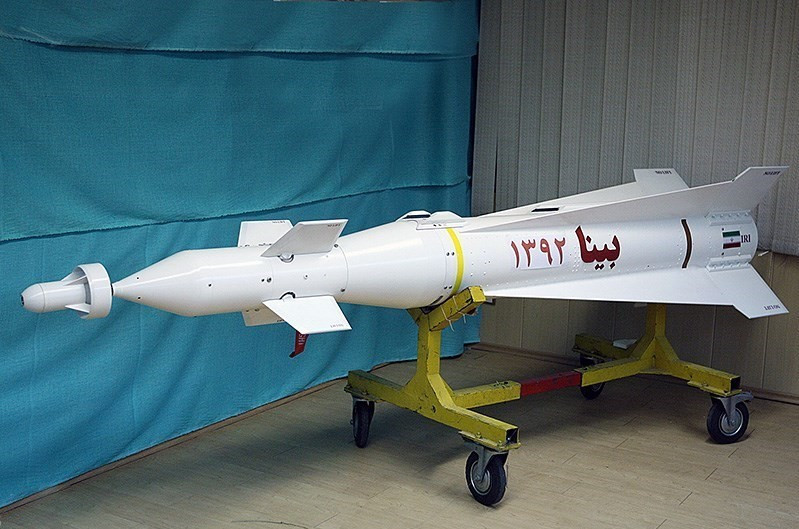
A Bina missile

Bina is a laser guided dual-capability short-range surface-to-surface and air-to-surface missile. It appears to be an AGM-65 Maverick air-to-ground missile with a semi-active laser (SAL) seeker fitted to its nose. Brigadier General Hossein Dehqan said the ballistic missile had radar-evading capabilities. "The new generation of long-range ground-to-ground ballistic missile with a fragmentation warhead and the laser-guided air-to-surface and surface-to-surface missile dubbed Bina (Insightful) have been successfully test-fired. The Bina missile is capable of striking important targets such as bridges, tanks and enemy command centres with great precision."

==== Liquid fuel program ====
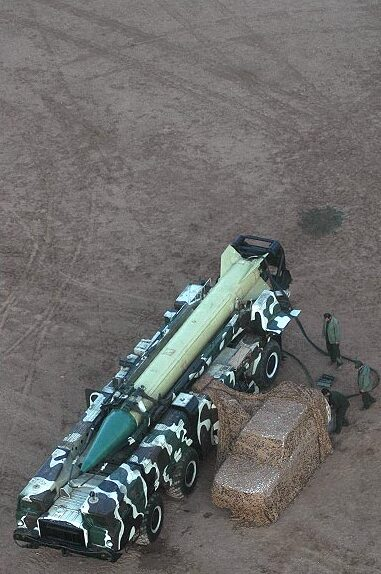
Great Prophet II

After the war, Iran's experience of liquid fuel missiles had purely focused on the reverse engineering of Scud-B missiles. However, with the post war reorganisation the focus of the effort quickly changed and focused on assembly and maintenance. A domestic version of the Scud-B, known as Shahab-1, was developed and manufactured. This led to its successor the Shahab-2, a variant of the Scud-C with a range of 500 to 700 km, and finally the Shahab-3.

Since the end of the war, Iran has consistently attempted to recruit foreign help, as well as its expatriate population, into its missile program. Iranian expatriates who left with the revolution have been slow to return, but many are now doing so and thus heralding a new age for Iran's missile development programme.

==== Other missile systems ====
Iran has an arsenal of short-range, liquid-fueled missiles including the Scud-B and Scud-C, and is now able to produce SCUD type missiles on its own, such as the R-17E, a variant of the Russian R-17 Elbrus (Scud-B). The Aerospace Industries Organization, a subsidiary of Iran's Ministry of Defense, supports the manufacturing process by engaging in SCUD missile restoration. Its short-range missile inventory also includes solid-fueled missiles, such as the Tondar-69 and the Fateh-110.

Also, Iranian artillery rockets include the Samid, the Shahin-2, the Naze'at, and the Zelzal family (Zelzal-1, Zelzal-2, and Zelzal-3).

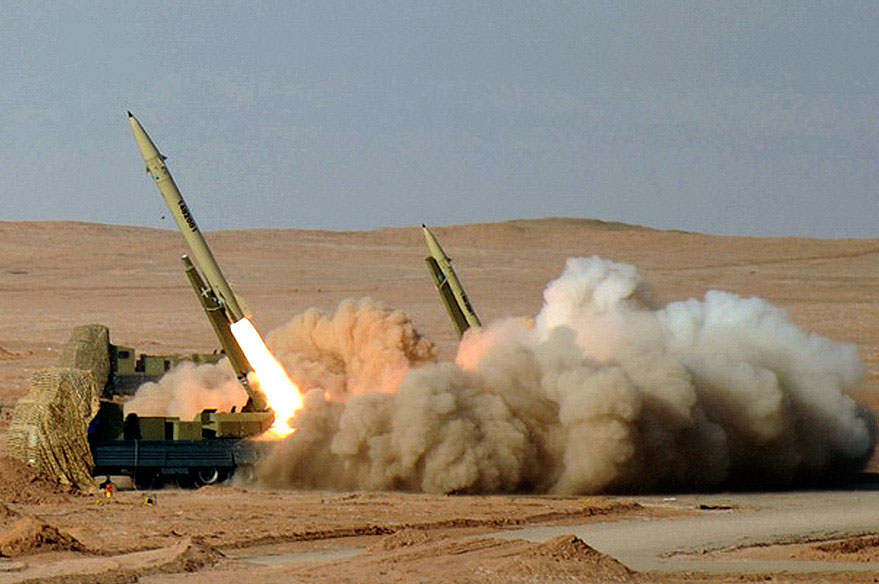
Fateh-110

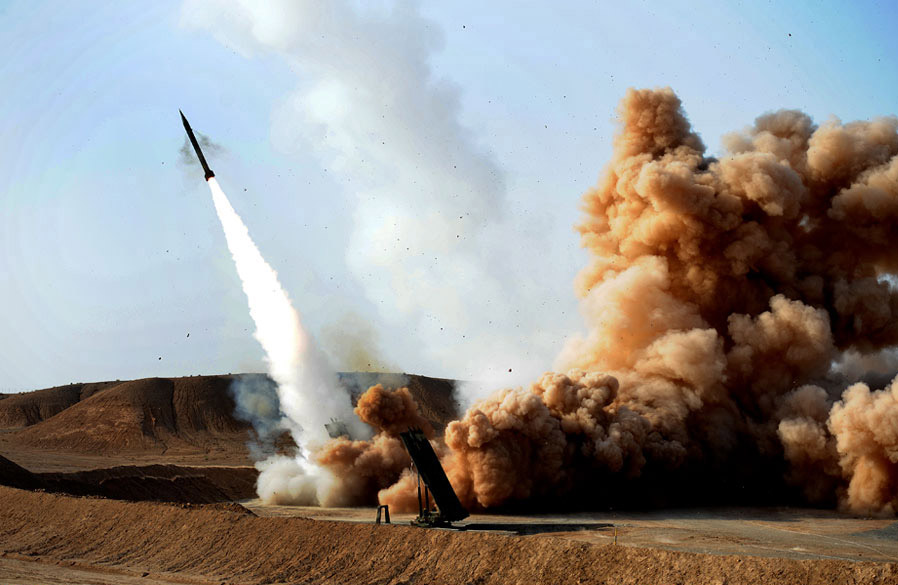
Zelzal-3

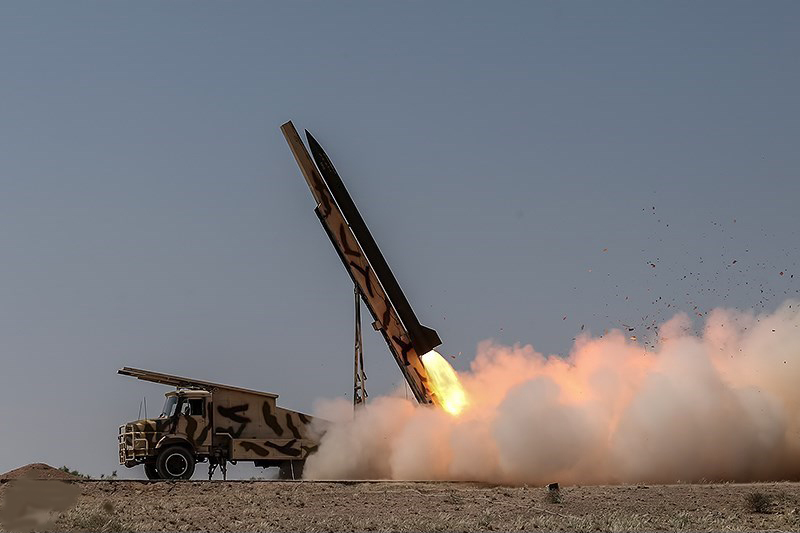
Naze'at

=== Longer range ballistic missiles (>1,000 km) ===
As of 2009, Iran has an active interest in developing, acquiring, and deploying a broad range of ballistic missiles, as well as developing a space launch capability. In mid-July 2008, Iran launched a number of ballistic missiles during military exercises, reportedly including the medium-range Shahab-3. Iran announced other missile and space launch tests in August and November 2008. In February 2009, Iran announced it launched a satellite into orbit and "officially achieved a presence in space".

==== Fajr-3 MIRV ====
The Fajr-3 is currently Iran's most advanced ballistic missile. It is a domestically developed liquid fuel missile with an unknown range. The Iranian government says it has multiple independently targeted reentry vehicles (MIRV) capabilities. Its MIRV capability may give it the ability of avoiding anti-missile surface-to-air missiles (SAMs). The missile was last launched during Holy Prophet wargames, which was the IRGC's largest naval war games ever. The Fajr-3 and the Fajr-3 artillery rocket are different systems.

==== Shahab-3 ====
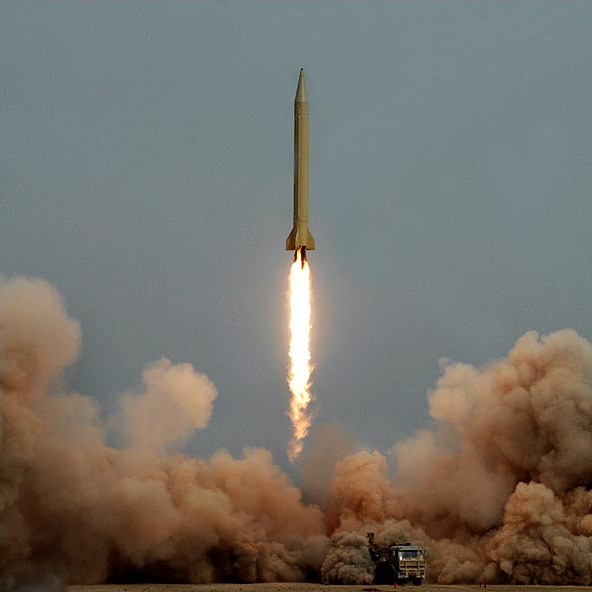
Shahab-3

The Shahab-3 is a medium-range ballistic missile (MRBM) that was built by Iran's military. Its first model, also known as Shahab-3A has a range of 1,300 km (810 mi). Soon after Iran came with a new model called Shahab-3B, which has a range of 2,000 km (1,200 mi), and can carry a heavier warhead. Making this missile was a major step in Iran's missile industry, and it opened the way to longer-range missiles. Shahab-3D, which followed the Shahab-3C, is Iran's latest Shahab model. A 2,000-kilometre (1,200 mi) range including Russia (as far as Moscow), Ukraine, parts of Hungary, Serbia, Greece, Egypt, Arabia, parts of India and China, as well as countries closer to Iran.

Jane's Information Group said in 2006 that Iran had six operational Shahab-3 brigades, the first of which was established in July 2003. They said that the six brigades were mainly equipped with standard variants, but with others described as enhanced Shahab-3 variants, with ranges of 1,300, 1,500, and 2,000 km (810, 930, and 1,240 mi), respectively. Anthony Cordesman at the Center for Strategic and International Studies however said only in August 2007 that 'the air force of the IRGC is believed to operate Iran's three Shahab-3 intermediate-range ballistic missiles units' while noting that their actual operational status remains uncertain.

==== Ghadr-110 ====
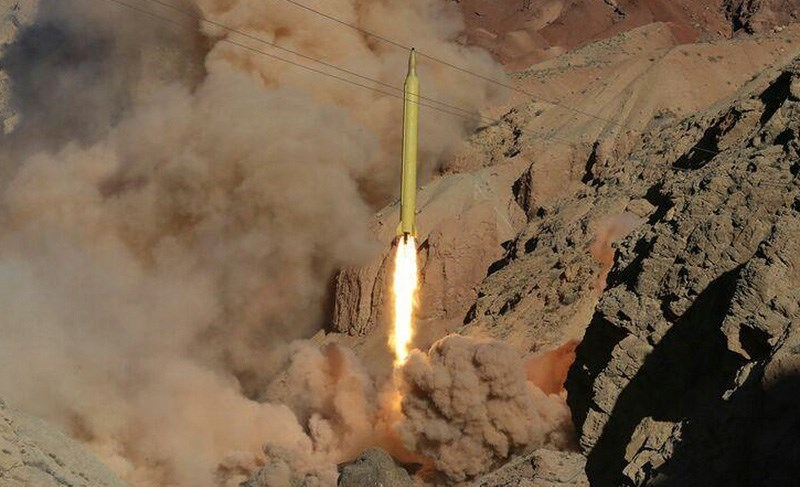
Ghadr-110

The Ghadr-110 is a medium-range ballistic missile designed and developed by Iran. The missile has a range of 1,800 to 2,000 kilometres (1,200 mi) and as such is the Iranian missile with the longest range.

It is believed to be an improved version of the Shahab-3, also known as the Ghadr-101. It has a liquid-fuel first stage and a solid-fuel second stage, which allows it to have a range of 2,000 km. It has a higher maneuverability than the Shahab-3 and a setup time of 30 minutes which is shorter than that of the Shahab-3.

==== Ashoura ====
In November 2007, Iranian Defence Minister Mostafa Mohammad-Najjar announced that Iran had built a new missile with a range of 2,000 km (1,200 mi), the Ashoura missile. He did not say how the missile differed from the Shahab-3, which has a range of 2,100 km (1,300 mi).

He told the gathering Basij militia during the manoeuvers they were holding that same week that the "construction of the Ashoura missile, with the range of 2,000 km (1,200 mi), is among the accomplishments of the Defence Ministry".

According to Jane's Defence Weekly, the Ashoura represents a major breakthrough in Iranian missile technology. It is the first two-stage MRBM using solid-fueled rocket motors instead of the existing liquid-fueled technology used on the Shahab. This would dramatically reduce the setup and deployment time for the missile and hence, shorten the amount of warning time for the enemy. Jane's noted that while the development parallels Pakistan's Shaheen-II MRBM there is no evidence to suggest there had been any prior technology exchange or with its other known technology partners such as North Korea or China.

==== Sejjil ====
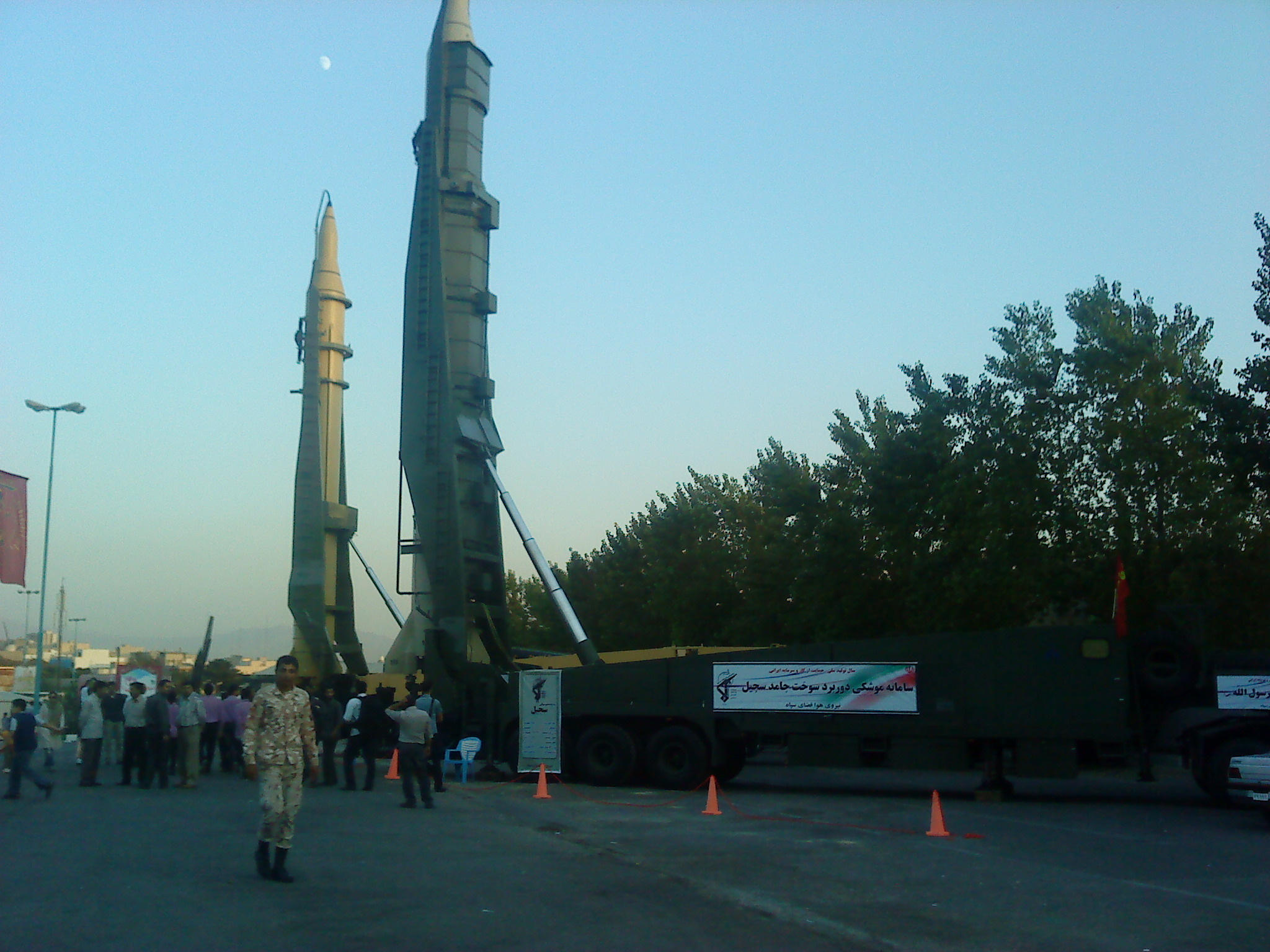
Sejjil-2 (right) and Qiam (left) missiles

The new two-stage solid-fuel missile has a range of nearly 2,500 km (1,600 mi), it was tested in November 2008. An improved version, the Sejjil-2, was tested in May 2009. Improvements include better navigation system, better targeting system, more payload, longer range, faster lift-off, longer storage time, quicker launch, and lower detection possibilities.

==== Simorgh ====
US Director of National Intelligence James Clapper told the Senate Armed Services Committee in February 2014 that Iran was expected to test "a missile system that could potentially have ICBM-class range", a possible reference to the Simorgh satellite launch vehicle (SLV) on which Iran is working.

==== Emad ====
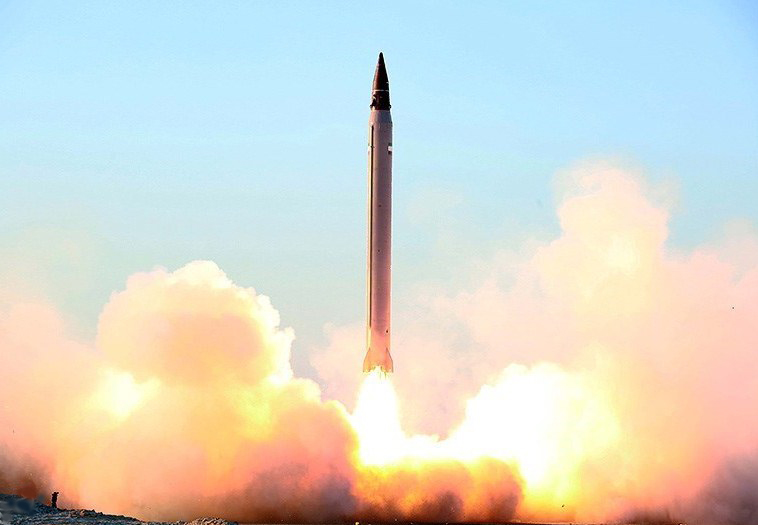
Emad missile

On October 10, 2015, Iran launched a new missile, the Emad. The Emad is capable of delivering a nuclear weapon and has a range of 1,700 km (c. 1,000 miles), enough to reach all of Israel and Saudi Arabia. It is considered to represent a great advance in accuracy, with a guidance and control system in its nose cone that functions during reentry into the atmosphere.

As a consequence of Iran's nuclear deal (JCPOA), on 20 July 2015 the United Nations Security Council Resolution 2231 was endorsed, replacing the Resolution 1929, which "called upon" Iran "not to undertake any activity related to ballistic missiles designed to be capable of delivering nuclear weapons". It has been argued that the language is not a legal prohibition. The U.S. ambassador to the UN Samantha Power said that the Emad missile was inherently capable of delivering a nuclear warhead which is therefore a violation. However, Vitaly Churkin, Russia's ambassador disputed this interpretation: "a call is different from a ban, so legally you cannot violate a call, you can comply with a call or you can ignore the call, but you cannot violate a call".

Iran's foreign minister, Javad Zarif, responded by saying that since Iran does not possess nuclear weapons nor does it ever intends in having one, it does not design its missiles (Emad) to be capable of carrying something it does not have. Nevertheless, the testing of the Emad missile took place before the adoption of the Resolution 2231. The US, France, Britain, Germany, Sweden, Turkey, and Australia asked the UN Security Council to investigate and take appropriate action.

==== Khorramshahr ====
A Khorramshahr missile

The Khorramshahr (Persian: خرمشهر), named after the city of Khorramshahr in Iran, is a medium-range ballistic missile that was tested by Iran in January 2017. With a range between 1,000 and 2,000 km, it can carry a 1,800 kg warhead and is 13 m in length.

==== Hoveyzeh ====
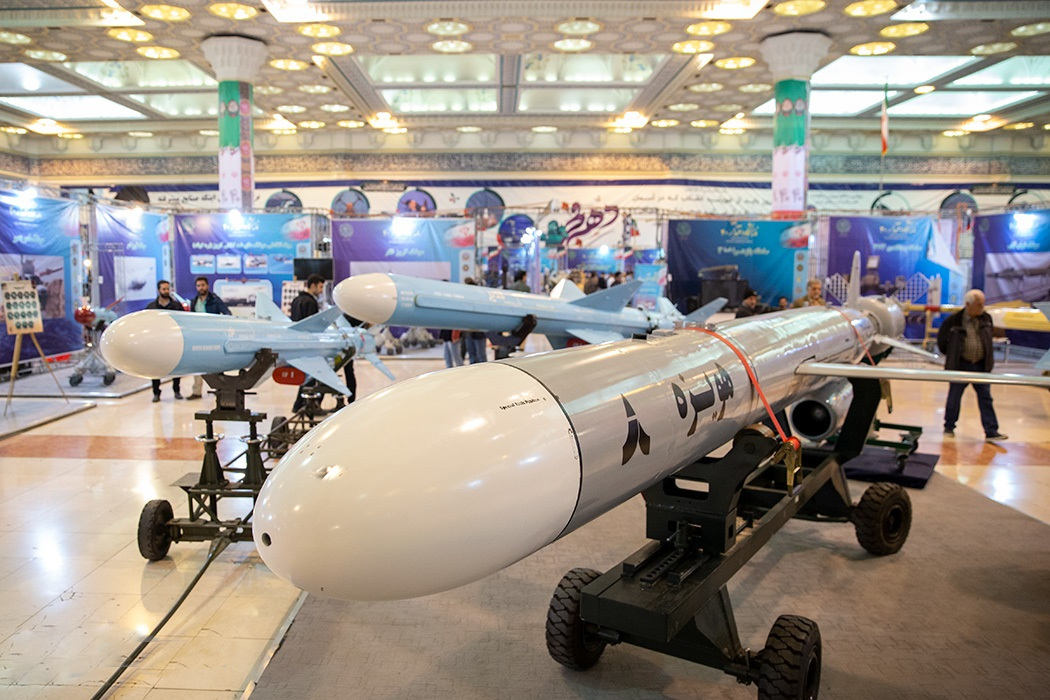
A Hoveyzeh cruise missile

The Hoveyzeh Cruise Missile is an all-weather, surface-to-surface cruise missile. The Hoveyzeh is from the Soumar family of cruise missiles. The missile was unveiled and put on display on February 2, 2019, at an exhibition of defense achievements in Tehran during commemorations of the 40th anniversary of the 1979 Iranian Revolution. The surface-to-surface cruise missile is capable of low altitude flight and has a range of 1,350 km (840 mi), a maximum range has not yet been given.

It has the ability to strike ground targets with high precision and accuracy. Its motor utilizes a turbojet, it releases low heat signatures and the missile is equipped to deal with the most sophisticated types of electronic warfare.

Discussing the capabilities of the missile, the Israeli military intelligence website DEBKAfile states that there is "no military force in the world has so far found an effective means of intercepting cruise missiles before they strike, unless they are short range". The missile is essentially immune to any sort of radar and missile defense systems.

==== Dezful ====
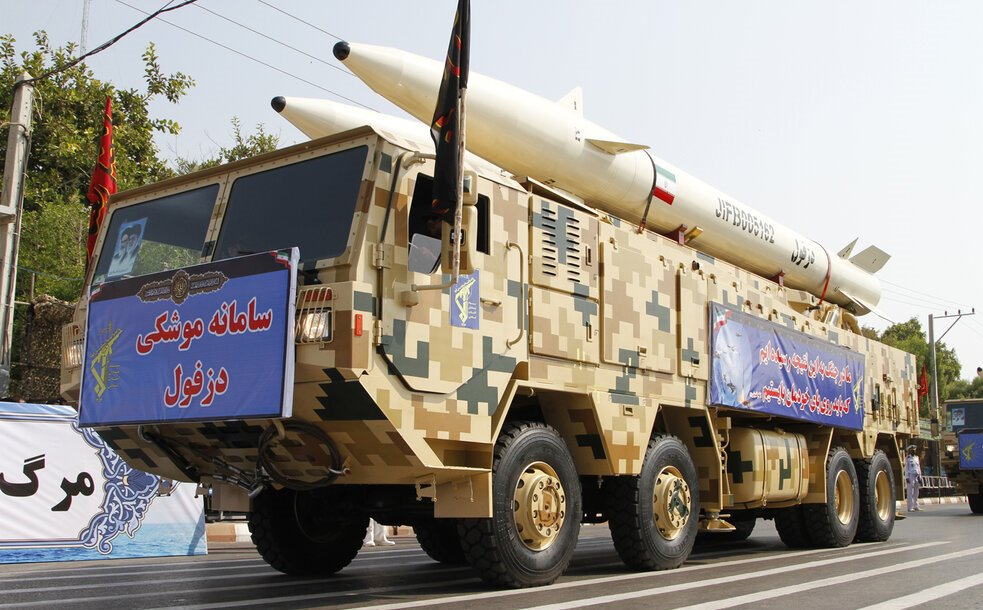
Dezful missiles on a truck

Dezful (Persian: دزفول) is a medium range ballistic missile (MRBM) developed by Iran and unveiled in February 2019 in an underground missile factory. The Iranian armed forces said that the missile has a range of over 1,000 kilometers (620 miles). It carries a 600 or 700 kg warhead and has a CEP (circular error of probability) of 5 meters. The missile can attain the speed of Mach 7 (8,643 km/h). Brigadier General Amir Ali Hajizadeh said this is an upgrade on the older Zolfaghar model, that had a range of 700 kilometers.

==== Raad-500 ====
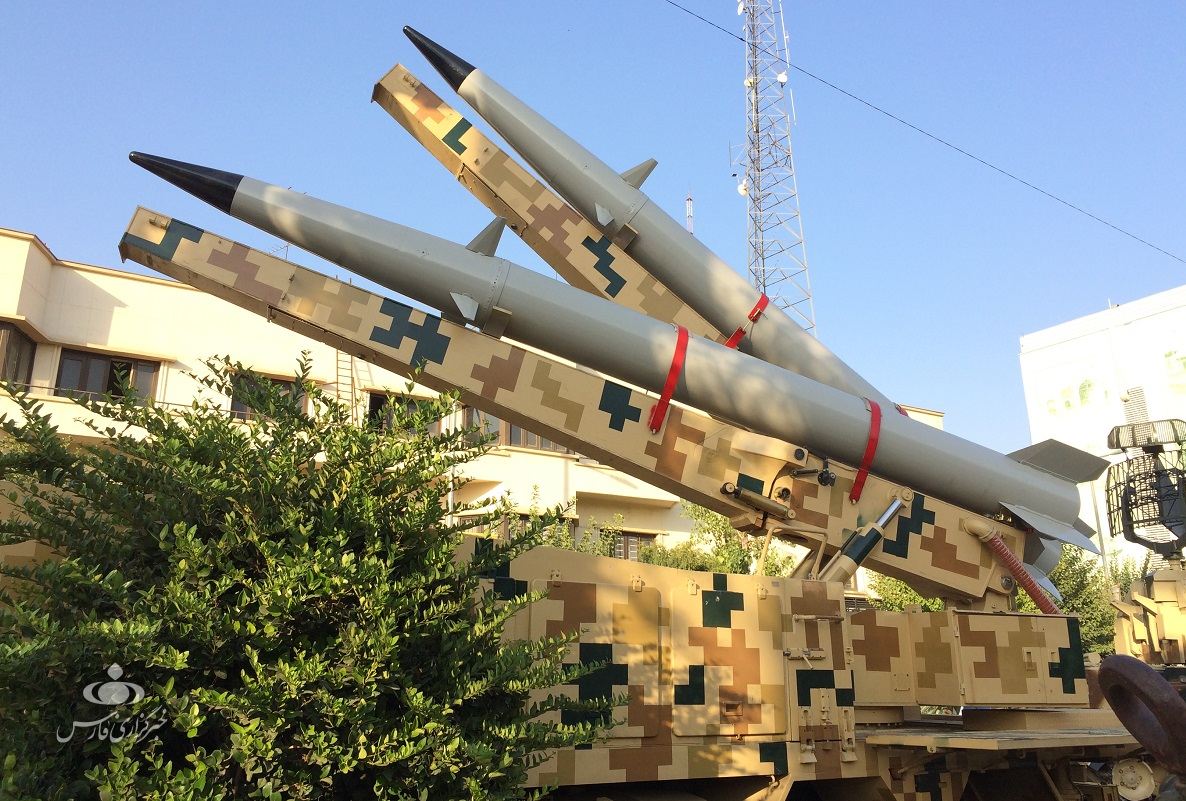
National Aerospace Park opening ceremony

Raad-500 missile is an Iranian SRBM/Tactical ballistic missile which is equipped with a progressive composite engine that is dubbed as "Zohair (Persian: زهیر)". Raad-500 means "Thunder 500", and it was designed by halving the weight of the previous Iranian missile (Fateh-110) whose body was made from metal; whereas the range of this new Iranian ballistic missile increased two hundred kilometers more than Fateh-110), and its final range is 500 kilometers.

==== Haj Qasem ====
Martyr Haj Qasem (Persian: موشک بالستیک شهید حاج قاسم) is an Iranian ballistic missile which was unveiled in August 2020. It is named after the Iranian commander Qasem Soleimani, who was assassinated by the US in January 2020.

Haj-Qasem's range is claimed by the Iranian military to be 1,400 kilometres (870 mi) with a claimed warhead weight of 500 kilograms (1,100 lb).

==== Qassem Bassir ====
The Qassem Bassir missile is an Iranian medium-range ballistic missile (MRBM) unveiled in May 2025. With a solid-fueled, two-stage system, it is presented as an improved variant of Iran's Haj Qassem series, named after Quds Force commander Qassem Soleimani. Iranian officials state the Qassem Bassir has a range of about 1,200 km, and features enhanced guidance and countermeasure resistance. Iran claims the Qassem Bassir missile can penetrate advanced missile defenses, and can strike selected targets (e.g. runways, aircraft hangars) with "pinpoint" accuracy without GPS, though western analysts have cast doubt on these claims which are likely tinted with internal propaganda.

=== Fattah ===
On 10 November 2022, during the 11th anniversary of the death of Hassan Tehrani Moghaddam, known as the "father of Iranian missiles", Iran announced it has built an advanced hypersonic ballistic missile calling it a "major generational leap". Brigadier General Amir Ali Hajizadeh, IRGC-ASF commander, said the missile has a high velocity and can maneuver below and above the Earth's atmosphere. He said "it can breach all the systems of anti-missile defence" and added that he believed it would take decades before a system capable of intercepting it is developed. He said it can breach the most advanced and significant missile defense systems in the world, and can also target them. The next day he stated that the tests have been made and that the missile will be unveiled in an appropriate time.

The missile was unveiled on 6 June 2023 with the name "Fattah".

== Anti-aircraft forces ==
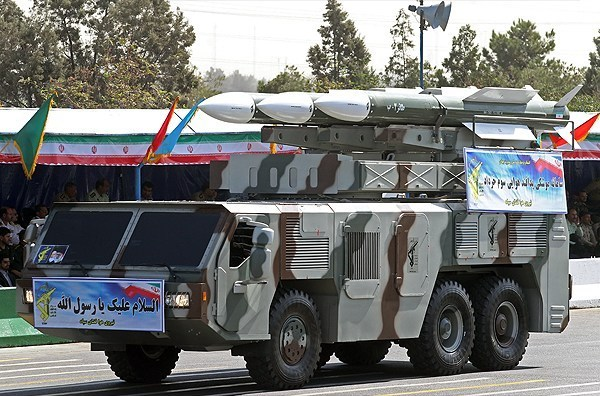
3rd Khordad transporter erector launcher

=== Surface-to-air missiles ===
IRGC Aerospace Force is known to operate the following air defense equipment:

Medium-range

- Raad/3rd Khordad
- Talash/15th Khordad

Point-defence

- Misagh-1 (QW-1 Vanguard)
- Misagh-2 (QW-18)

== Space Command ==
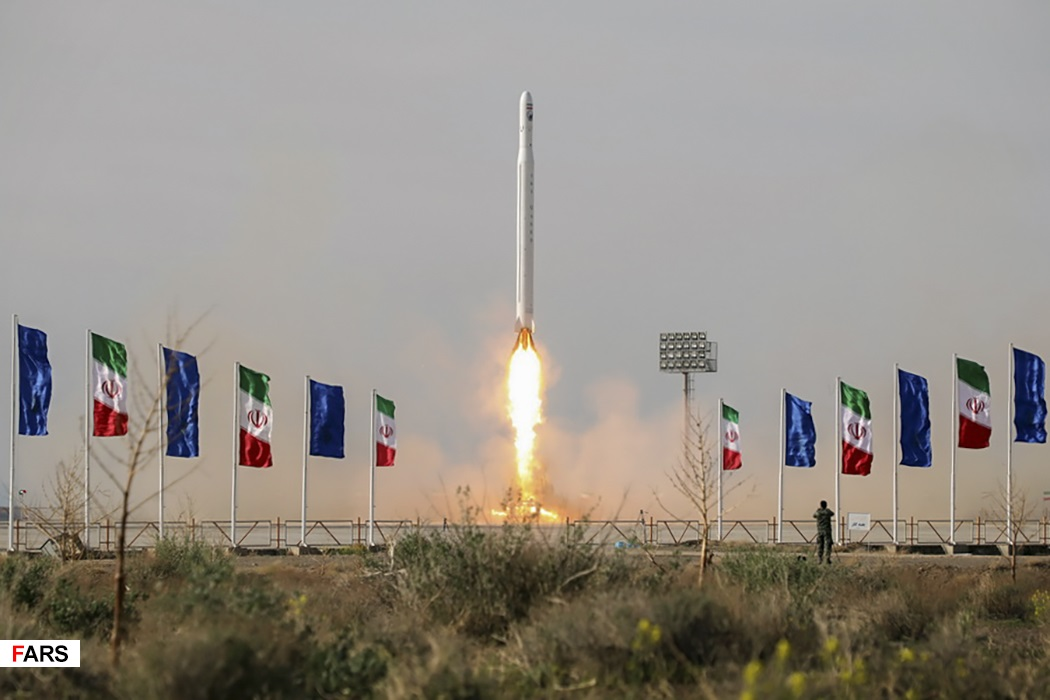
The first launch of the Qased SLV

The IRGC Aerospace Force has been running its own space program, and on 22 April 2020, it made existence of its own 'Space Command' public. On that date it successfully launched its first military satellite, the Noor, into orbit. This was acknowledged by Western experts, and marked joining the club of about a dozen countries to have carried out such a project.

The United States Space Force's chief of space operations, General John W. Raymond, said it was unlikely that Iran's Noor satellite provided any information of value, describing it as "a tumbling webcam in space". However, an Israeli security source told Haaretz that the satellite is "indeed an important accomplishment for the Iranian space program in general and its military in particular". Uzi Rubin commented that he "wouldn't be surprised" if an Iranian system of operational military space assets was soon operational.

In July 2020, the Aerospace Force said that it had received detailed images of Al Udeid Air Base in Qatar, where United States Central Command's forward headquarters is hosted, captured by the satellite.

In March 2022, a second launch of the Qased launch vehicle from the Shahroud Space Center put the Noor-2 military reconnaissance satellite into orbit.

Commander of the Space Command, Brigadier General Ali Jafarabadi, has stated that the reconnaissance satellite is part of a larger project that will include satellites with communication and navigation capabilities, in addition to reconnaissance.

In November 2022, the IRGC conducted a successful suborbital test launch of the newly unveiled Qaem-100 launch vehicle.

In September 2023, Noor-3, also called Najm, was launched on a Qassed launcher to a 450 kilometer orbit. It weighs 24 kg, with a camera image resolution of 6 to 4.8 meters.

In January 2024, the Qaem 100 launch vehicle successfully performed its first orbital launch, placing the Soraya satellite into a 750 km orbit, setting a new altitude record for Iran.

== Organization ==
Its personnel size is unknown according to the Congressional Research Service, while International Institute of Strategic Studies estimated that the military branch had 15,000 sworn members as of 2020.

== Commanders ==
No.	Portrait	Commander	Took office	Left office	Time in office	Ref.
1	Mousa Refan	Mousa Refan (born 1958)	17 September 1985	24 April 1990	4–5 years	–
2	Hossein Dehghan	Brigadier general Hossein Dehghan (born 1957)	24 April 1990	18 January 1992	1 year, 269 days	–
3	Mohammad Hossein Jalali	Brigadier general Mohammad Hossein Jalali	18 January 1992	30 October 1997	5 years, 285 days	–
4	Mohammad Bagher Ghalibaf	Brigadier general Mohammad Bagher Ghalibaf (born 1961)	30 October 1997	28 June 2000	2 years, 242 days	–
5	Ahmad Kazemi	Brigadier general Ahmad Kazemi (1958–2006)	28 June 2000	25 August 2005	5 years, 58 days	–
6	Mohammad Reza Zahedi	Brigadier general Mohammad Reza Zahedi (1960–2024)	25 August 2005	21 January 2006	149 days	–
7	Hossein Salami	Brigadier general Hossein Salami (1960–2025)	21 January 2006	4 October 2009	3 years, 256 days	–
8	Amir Ali Hajizadeh	Brigadier general Amir Ali Hajizadeh (1962–2025)	4 October 2009	13 June 2025 †	15 years, 252 days	
9	Majid Mousavi	Brigadier general Majid Mousavi	13 June 2025	Incumbent	1 year, 123 days	

== See also ==
- List of air forces
- List of space forces
- Iran's ballistic missiles program
