= Shahab-6 =

Alleged Iranian missile project

Shahab-6 (Persian: Ŝahāb 6, meaning "Meteor-6", Persian: Toqyân, طغیان) is the designation of an alleged Iranian long-range ballistic missile project.

== Capabilities ==
According to reports released in 1996, the missile has a range of about 14,000 kilometers. Its manufacturing technology comes from Russia and North Korea. According to these reports, the Shahab 6 missile was operational until 2014, and it is a completely redesigned model of North Korea's Taepodong 2 ballistic missile (Enkasasal-X-2). No reliable estimates of the Shahab-6's capability exist. According to Israeli intelligence, both the Shahab-5 and Shahab-6 would have a range of 8,500-10,000 kilometers. The Washington Times reported Israeli prime minister Benjamin Netanyahu as describing the Shahab-6 as having the capability to reach the US Eastern Seaboard.

== Variants ==
Shahab is the name of a class of Iranian missiles, service time of 1988–present, of which three variants are confirmed: Shahab-1, Shahab-2, Shahab-3. The Shahab-4, Shahab-5, Shahab-6 (Toqyān) were alleged to exist by Western and Israeli sources in the early 1990s, but these allegations were not proven.

== See also ==
- Military of Iran
- Defense industry of Iran
- Equipment of the Iranian Army
