= Qassem Bassir =

Iranian ballistic missile

- Type: Medium-range ballistic missile
- Place of origin: Iran

Service history
- Used by: Iran

Production history
- Designer: Islamic Revolutionary Guard Corps Aerospace Force
- Manufacturer: Ministry of Defence and Armed Forces Logistics (Iran)
- Produced: 2025

Specifications
- Propellant: Two-stage solid fuel
- Guidance system: Inertial navigation + electro-optical/infrared terminal seeker
- Launch platform: Road-mobile TEL

The Qassem Bassir (also transliterated Qasem or Ghasem Bassir) missile is an Iranian medium-range ballistic missile (MRBM) unveiled in May 2025. With a solid-fueled, two-stage system, it is presented as an improved variant of Iran’s Haj Qassem series, named after Quds Force commander Qassem Soleimani. Iranian officials state the Qassem Bassir has a range of about 1,200 km, and features enhanced guidance and countermeasure resistance. The missile was revealed by Iranian Defense Minister Brig. Gen. Aziz Nasirzadeh on Iranian state television on 4 May 2025, and is assessed to be the most advanced missile in Iran's arsenal.

== Development ==
The Qassem Bassir emerged from Iran’s ongoing missile program development. It is explicitly an upgrade of the "Shahid Haj Qassem" medium-range ballistic missile (MRBM) first unveiled in 2020 (with a longer advertised 1,400 km range). According to Institute for the Study of War, the Qassem Basir was designed to address lessons learned from Iran’s April and October 2024 missile attacks on Israel, where US and Israeli ballistic missile defense systems (THAAD and Arrow respectively) proved largely effective against Iranian missiles.

=== Design and technical characteristics ===
Estimates from Iranian sources suggest the Qassem Bassir re-enters the atmosphere at speeds up to ~Mach 11 and impacts at about Mach 5, classifying it as hypersonic at terminal phase.

==== Guidance system ====
The Qassem Bassir’s guidance system combines inertial navigation with an advanced electro-optical sensor for the terminal phase. According to the Iranian Defense Ministry, it carries a thermal imaging (Infrared) camera that allows the missile to visually identify and home in on designated targets by their heat signatures, this means it can attempt to "see" its target and maneuver toward it without relying on any satellite GPS signal. Iranian reports claim that during testing the Qassem Bassir flew under intense jamming, yet its autonomous optical seeker and onboard inertial units maintained trajectory. Observers note this is the first Iranian MRBM reported to use an image-based (infrared/optical) terminal seeker. In practice, this guidance scheme should make the Qassem Bassir largely immune to radio-frequency jamming; as one analyst explained, by matching real-time images to stored terrain or target shapes, the missile avoids any external signals that an enemy could block. Iran claims that the Qassem Bassir can achieve near "meter-level" accuracy against selected targets (e.g. airfield facilities).

==== Missile defense evasion ====
During reentry, the missile's fins reportedly allow the warhead to perform course changes at supersonic speed

Independent analysts caution that such figures likely include elements of propaganda. Others, such as Andreas Krieg, a senior lecturer at King’s College London, are skeptical about Iran's claims about the new missile, stating that they need to be taken with a "pinch of salt,”, further stating about Iran that "they claim a lot" in order to retain a deterrent posture in anticipation of a rise in military tensions between Iran and the US.

Parameter	Reported figure/feature	Reported advantage
Range	~1,200 km(Reportedly, a 3000 km range model based on North Korean design is under development)	
Speed		
Impact speed	Mach 5	
Length	≈ 11 m	
Launch mass	≈ 7 t	
Launch vehicle	Mobile transporter-erector-launchers (TELs)	
Warhead	~500 kg (unitary or modular)	
Fuel	Solid	
Propulsion	Two‑stage solid‑fuel motor	
Guidance system	Thermal Imaging Sensor, Electro-optical imaging and onboard inertial measurement units (IMU)as well as Electronic Protective Measures (EPM)	Improved accuracy through identification of targets by heat signature during terminal flight phase, not dependent on satellite navigation systems (GPS) though reportedly retains satellite signal correction capabilities. The EPM protects the missile's guidance system from electronic interference and jamming.

== Test firing and unveiling ==
According to the Iranian Ministry of Defense, the Qassem Bassir missile was successfully test-fired on 16–17 April 2025, striking a target over 1,200 km away. On 4 May 2025, the missile’s formal unveiling took place, while US-Iran talks were on hold after a pause requested by Oman’s foreign minister. In public statements, Iranian Defense Minister Aziz Nasirzadeh and media outlets stressed that Bassir’s enhancements in guidance and maneuverability address the deficiencies of earlier missiles, while stating that US bases in the region would be legitimate targets if military tensions in the area were to increase.

== See also ==
- Haj Qassem
- Defense industry of Iran
- List of military equipment manufactured in Iran
- Iran's ballistic missiles program
- List of equipment of the Iranian Army
- 2025–2026 Iran–United States negotiations
