= Shahab-2 =

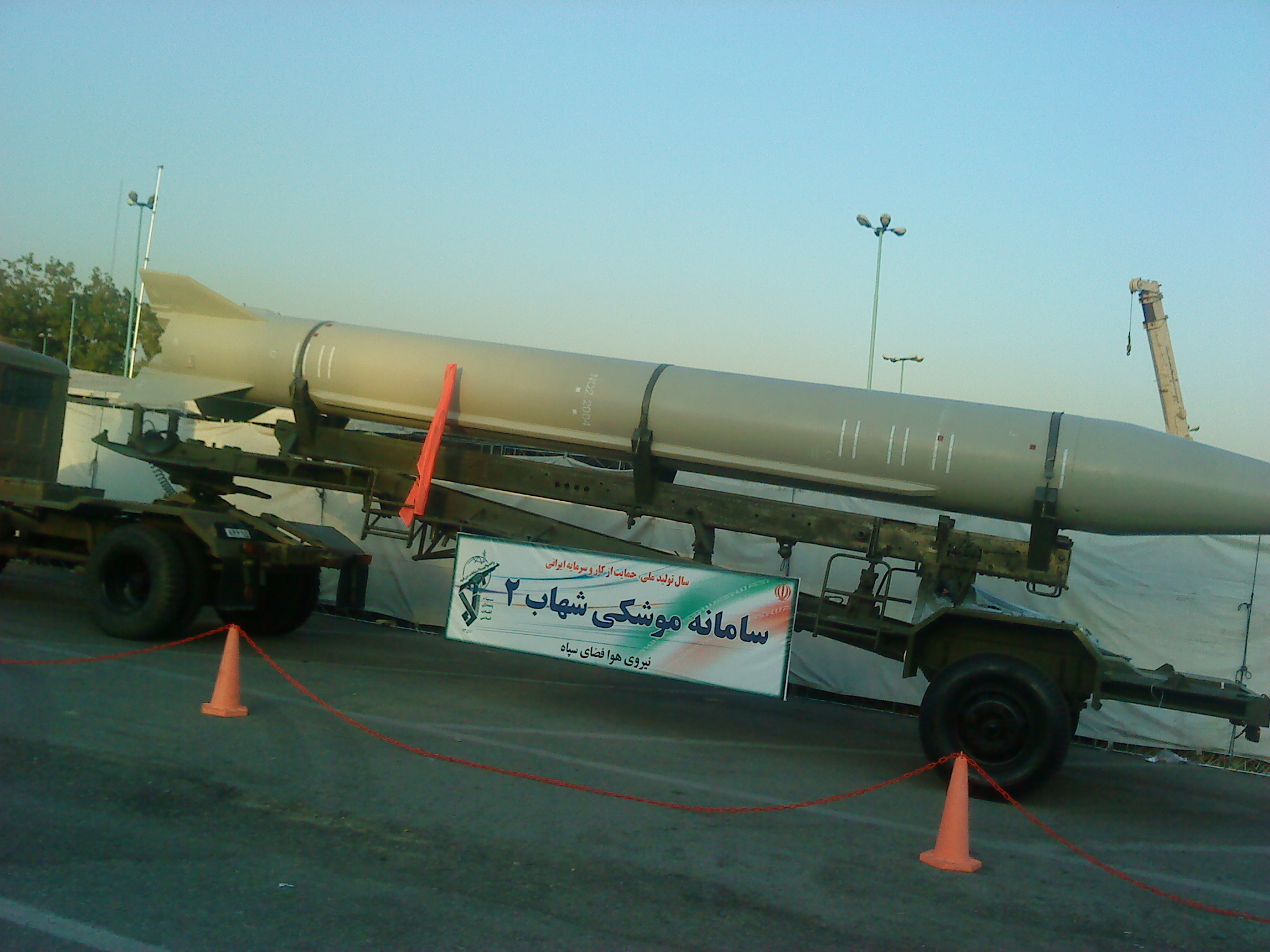
- Type: Tactical SRBM

Service history
- In service: 1990–2016 (in Iran); present (in Syria)
- Used by: See § Operators

Production history
- Manufacturer: Iran

Specifications
- Mass: 6,370–6,500 kg
- Length: 11.37–12.29 m
- Diameter: 0.885 m
- Warhead: 770kg
- Engine: Liquid
- Operational range: 500 km
- Guidance system: inertial
- Accuracy: 500m CEP

The Shahab-2 (Persian: شهاب ۲, romanized: Ŝahāb 2, meaning "Meteor-2") is a tactical short-range ballistic missile that is the successor to the Iranian Shahab-1 missile. It is based on the North Korean Hwasong-6 (modified version of the Hwasong-5, itself a modification of the Soviet R-17 Elbrus).

== History ==
On November 2, 2006, Iran fired unarmed missiles to begin 10 days of military simulations. Iranian state television reported "dozens of missiles were fired, including Shahab-2 and Shahab-3 missiles. The missiles ranged from 300 km to up to 2,000 km. Iranian experts have made some changes to Shahab-3 missiles, installing cluster warheads in them with the capacity to carry 1,400 bombs."

These launches come after some United States-led military exercises in the Persian Gulf on October 30, 2006, meant to train for blocking the transport of weapons of mass destruction.

In 2016, Iranian state-aligned news website Mashregh News reported that production of Shahab-1 and Shahab-2 missiles had ceased.

== Variants ==
Shahab is the name of a class of Iranian missiles, service time of 1988–present, which comes in six variants: Shahab-1, Shahab-2, Shahab-3, Shahab-4, Shahab-5, Shahab-6.

== Operators ==
- Iran
- Ba'athist Syria

== See also ==
- Ballistic missile program of Iran
- Qiam 1
- Military of Iran
- Iran's missile forces
- Iranian military industry
- Equipment of the Iranian Army
