= Haj Qasem (missile) =

Iranian ballistic missile

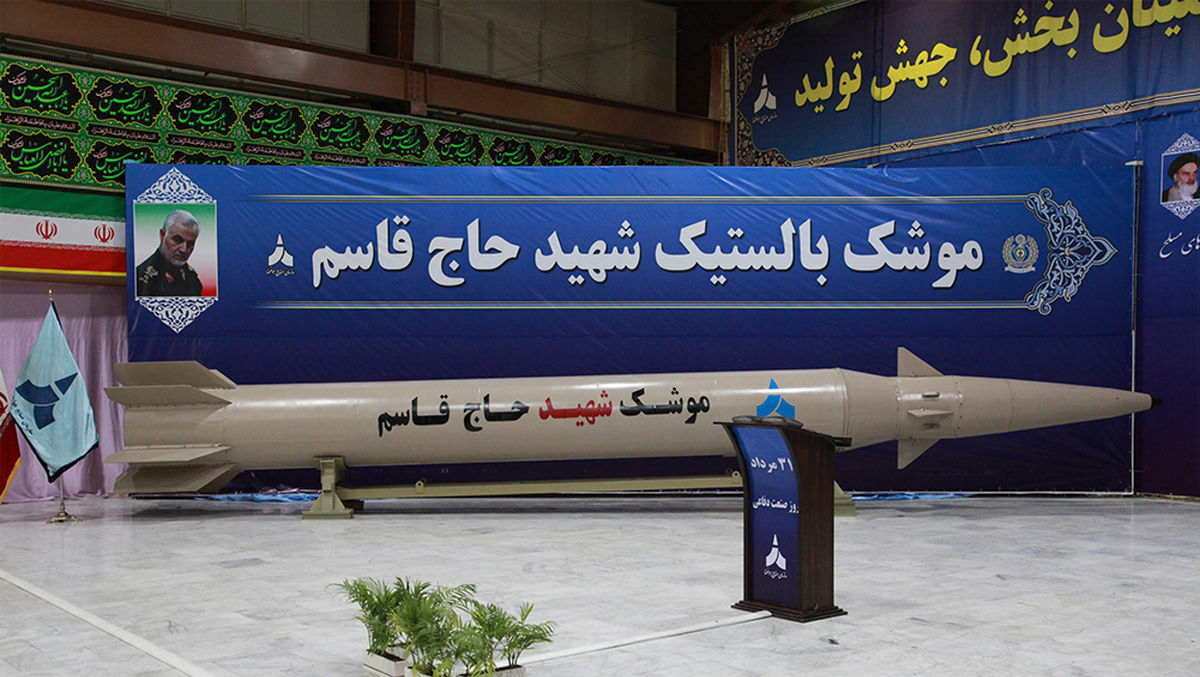
- A Haj Qasem missile
- Type: Medium-range ballistic missile
- Place of origin: Iran

Service history
- In service: 20 August 2020
- Used by: Iran

Production history
- Designer: Ministry of Defence and Armed Forces Logistics (Iran)
- Variants: Qassem Bassir

Specifications
- Mass: 7 tonnes (15,000 lb)
- Length: 11 metres (36 ft)
- Warhead weight: 500 kilograms (1,100 lb)
- Operational range: 1400 Km
- Maximum speed: Mach 12

Martyr Haj Qasem (sometimes Qassem) (Persian: موشک بالستیک شهید حاج قاسم) is an Iranian ballistic missile developed as part of the country's missile program. It was unveiled in August 2020, and is named after the Iranian Islamic Revolutionary Guard Corps commander Qasem Soleimani who was assassinated by the US in January 2020.

Haj-Qasem's range is 1,400 kilometres (870 mi) with a warhead weighing 500 kilograms (1,100 lb). Alongside the unveiling of the "Haj-Qasem (Soleimani) missile", Iran unveiled a naval cruise missile, the Abu Mahdi.

On May 4, 2025 Iranian Defense Minister Brig. Gen. Aziz Nasirzadeh unveiled the Qassem Bassir as an improved variant of Iran’s Haj Qassem series on Iranian state television. The missile is a medium-range ballistic missile (MRBM) with a solid-fueled, two-stage system. Iranian officials state the Qassem Bassir has a range of about 1,200 kilometres (750 mi), and features enhanced guidance and countermeasure resistance. Iran claims the Qassem Bassir missile can penetrate advanced missile defenses, and can strike selected targets (e.g. runways, aircraft hangars) with "pinpoint" accuracy without GPS, though western analysts have cast doubt on these claims which are likely tinted with internal propaganda.

The Haj Qassem was developed from Iran's Zolfaghar missile.

Haj Qasem missiles are believed to undergo final assembly in the Kuh-e Barjamali site, which is part of Iran's Khojir Aerospace Complex southeast of Tehran. The site was bombed by the US on 7 March 2026.

On 18 July 2026, Iranian state media reported that Haj Qassem missiles had been fired at some Persian Gulf states and Jordan.

== See also ==
- Islamic Revolutionary Guard Corps Aerospace Force
- Ministry of Defence and Armed Forces Logistics (Iran)
- List of military equipment manufactured in Iran
- Science and technology in Iran
- Qassem Bassir
