= Shahab-1 =

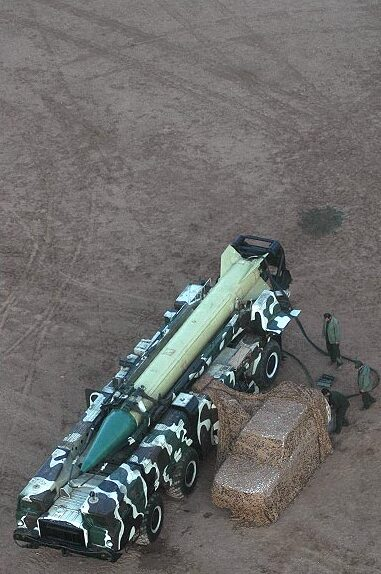
- Type: Tactical SRBM

Service history
- In service: ~1987–2016 (in Iran)

Production history
- Manufacturer: Iran

Specifications
- Mass: 5,860 kg
- Length: 10.94 m
- Diameter: 0.885 m
- Warhead: 1,000 kg
- Operational range: 350 km
- Guidance system: Inertial
- Accuracy: approximately 450m circular error probable (CEP)

The Shahab-1 (Persian: شهاب ۱, romanized: Ŝahāb 1, meaning "Meteor-1") was the foundation of the short-range Iranian missile program. During the Iran–Iraq War, Iran purchased R-17 Elbrus missiles (also known as the Scud-B) from Libya, Syria and North Korea (Hwasong-5). It is a close copy of Hwasong-5 (R-17).

Iran began making the Shahab-1 sometime between 1985 and 1988. It is a short-range ballistic missile derived from the Scud-B, and has a maximum range of 300 km (185 miles).

Iran employed Shahab-1s extensively during the 1990s and early 2000s against the Mujahidin-e Khalq Organization (MKO) camps in Iraq.

Production of Shahab-1s ceased in 2016.

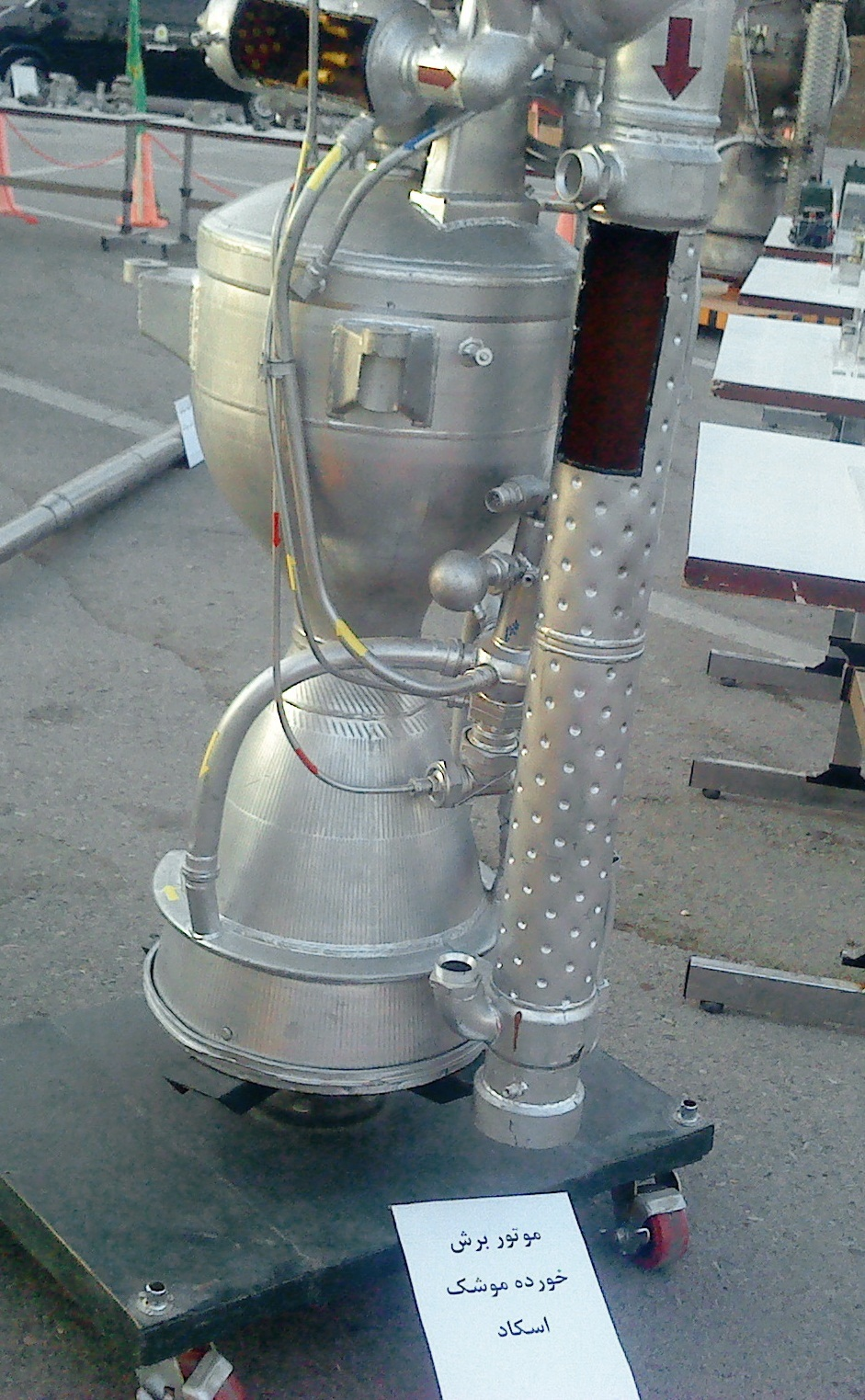
Shahab-1 engine at a 2012 military exhibition in Tehran

== Variants ==
Shahab is the name of a class of Iranian missiles, service time of c. 1987–present, which comes in six variants: Shahab-1, Shahab-2, Shahab-3, Shahab-4, Shahab-5, and Shahab-6.

== Operators ==
- Iran
- Ba'athist Syria

== Gallery ==
Shahab-1 launch day, 3 July 2012

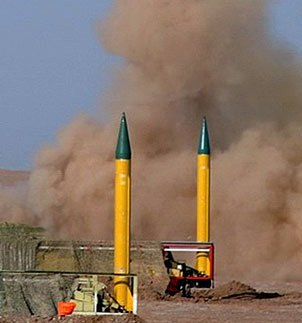
Operational pre-launch

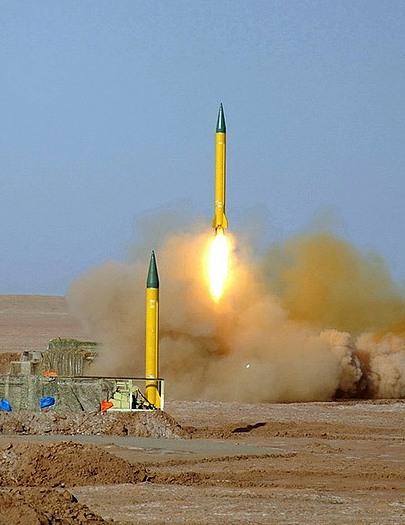
Lift-off (cropped)

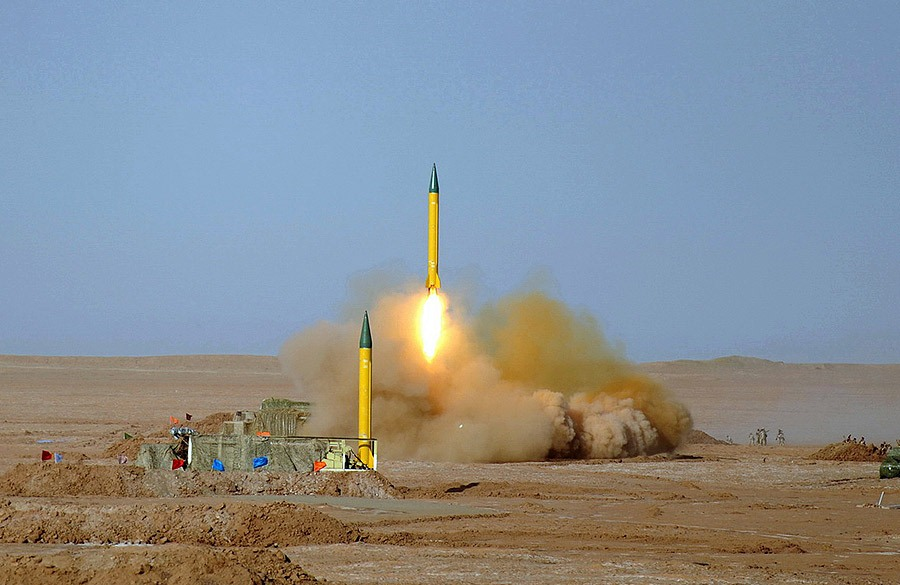
Lift-off

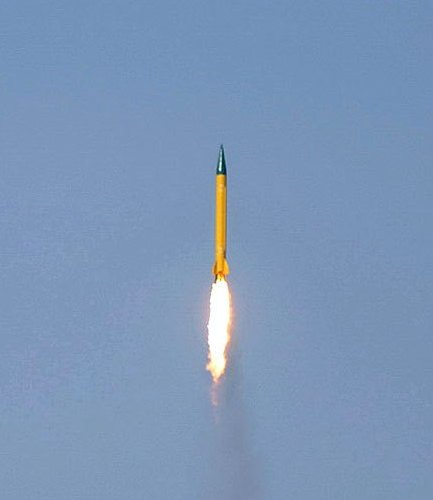
Flight (cropped)

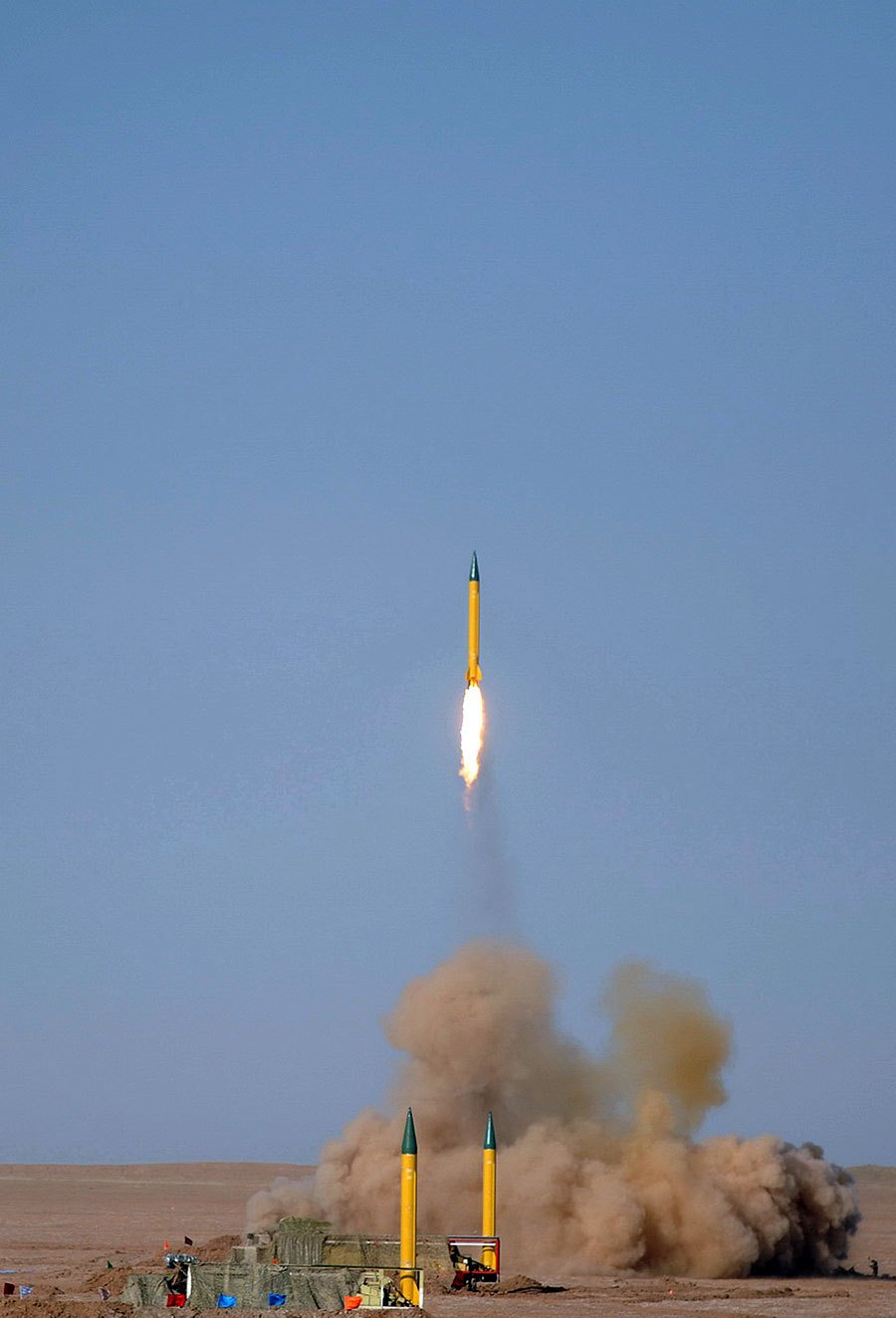
Flight

== See also ==
- Military of Iran
- Islamic Revolutionary Guard Corps Aerospace Force
- Defense industry of Iran
- List of equipment of the Iranian Army
- Shahab-2
- Shahab-3
- Shahab-4
