= 2026 interceptions of Iranian missiles in Turkey =

- Part of the 2026 Iran war
Date	4 March 2026; 9 March 2026; 13 March 2026; 30 March 2026
Location	Turkey (Adana, Gaziantep and Hatay)
Result	4 Iranian ballistic missiles shot down

Belligerents
Iran	NATO; Turkey; Spain; United States

Casualties and losses
None	

During the 2026 Iran war, several Iranian missiles were intercepted by NATO forces over Turkish airspace.

== Background ==
Since the 1990s, Turkey and Iran have been competing for regional spheres of influence within the Middle East and North Africa. Turkey joined the North Atlantic Treaty Organization (NATO) in 1952, putting it in an American-led alliance bloc. It is the only NATO country in the Middle East.

In September 2011, parts of the NATO missile defense system were installed on Turkish soil. This led to a diplomatic crisis between Iran and Turkey. The former declared that the missile shield was an American plot to protect Israel in the event that the Israelis decide to strike Iran's nuclear facilities. Turkey insisted that the defense system was European-related matter, and did not seek to specifically target any specific country. Hillary Clinton, then US Secretary of State, later warned Iran over the missile system in October 2011, stating "Iran would be badly miscalculating if they did not look at the entire region and all of our presence in many countries, both in bases and in training with NATO allies, like Turkey." In November 2011, the head of the aerospace division of the Iranian Islamic Revolutionary Guard Corps (IRGC) threatened to strike Turkey in the event of an attack on Iran.

In the past, Turkey's relationship with Israel has caused issues between Ankara and Tehran. However, according to Pars Today, an Iranian state news website, following the initiation of the Twelve-Day War, the Turkish foreign minister Hakan Fidan characterized the Iranian strikes on as a legitimate act of self-defense, underscoring Iran's right to protect itself.

== Interceptions ==
On 4 March 2026, NATO air and missile defense installations in Turkey and the Eastern Mediterranean intercepted a ballistic missile that was bound for Turkey, with the anti-ballistic munition falling in Dörtyol, Hatay. Following the incident, Turkish officials remarked that the missile was launched from Iran and passed by Iraq and Syria before its shootdown. Turkey then asserted her "right to retaliate." The Iranian ambassador in Ankara was shortly after summoned to the Ministry of Foreign Affairs, in which Iran denied any involvement.

An Arleigh Burke-class destroyer of the United States Navy engaged the ballistic missile, utilizing an RIM-161 Standard Missile 3, video analysis of the debris suggests. The Spanish government also stated that its MIM-104 Patriot battery that was deployed in Turkey for NATO support mission "assisted" the interception.

On 9 March, a second ballistic missile was downed over Gaziantep. The debris was removed by the security services and there were no casualties reported. The Turkish defense ministry released another firm statement, reiterating that Turkey will "decisively" respond to any threat against its soil.

On 13 March, a third Iranian ballistic missile was intercepted by NATO air defenses near Incirlik Air Base.

On 18 March, NATO said that it will deploy an additional Patriot system in southern Turkey.

On March 30, the Defence Ministry said that for the fourth time NATO air defense systems intercepted an Iranian missile that entered Turkey's air space. Ankara sent a protest and warning to Tehran saying "all necessary measures were being taken "decisively and without hesitation" against any threat directed at Turkey's territory and airspace".

== Response ==
On 7 March 2026, a subsequent Turkish presidential decree established separate "Directorates of Emergency Situations and Defense Planning" (Turkish: Acil Durumlar ve Savunma Planlaması Dairesi Başkanlığı) subordinating to all individual cabinet ministries except the Ministry of National Defense. The novel offices are tasked with "civil defense" and "war preparedness", as per the Resmî Gazete. Plans for such bodies were already underway since at least October 2025 and the ballistic missile threats on Turkey accelerated the process.

Soon after the second attack, Turkey deployed a squadron of six F-16 Fighting Falcon multirole fighters in the Turkish Republic of Northern Cyprus, The previous week, British military installations in Akrotiri and Dhekelia, a British Overseas Territory, were targeted by drones, inducing Greek response to position F-16 fighter jets in Cyprus.

Referring to the potential security threats, the United States suspended its consulate in Adana, where the Incirlik Air Base is located, evacuating government employees and their families. Diplomatic operations in Ankara and Istanbul will remain uninterrupted.

NATO eventually deployed an additional MIM-104 Patriot battery in Turkey's Malatya and the Turkish authorities took "national level precautions" in an attempt to bolster the country's air and missile defense capabilities.

== Reactions ==
Turkish foreign minister Hakan Fidan told Iranian foreign minister Abbas Araghchi that Iran’s violation of Turkish airspace was "unacceptable". On 10 March 2026, following the second missile intercepted over Turkish airspace, president Recep Tayyip Erdoğan sent a firm warning to Iran to stop their "wrong and provocative steps."
