= Fattah-2 =

Iranian medium-range hypersonic missile

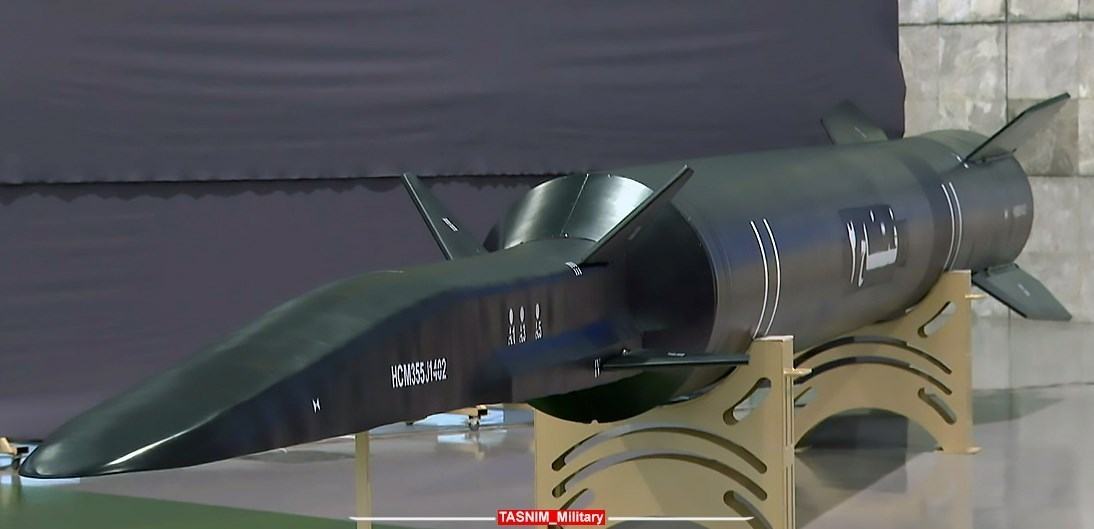
- Fattah‑2 prototype unveiled at IRGC Aerospace Force exhibition, November 2023
- Type: Hypersonic missile

Service history
- Used by: Iran

Production history
- Designer: IRGC
- Manufacturer: AIO

Specifications
- Warhead: Conventional Warhead
- Propellant: Stage 1: Solid‑Fuel Booster; Stage 2: Liquid‑Fuel HGV
- Operational range: 1,500 kilometres (930 mi)
- Launch platform: Road‑mobile TEL

Fattah-2 (Persian: فتاح‑۲, lit. 'Conqueror‑2') is an Iranian hypersonic missile project unveiled by the Islamic Revolutionary Guard Corps in November 2023 and still under development. It is introduced as a successor of Fattah‑1, with a hypersonic glide vehicle (HGV) designed to reach high speed and maneuverability.

== Capabilities ==
According to Iranian statements, Fattah-2 can travel at speeds up to Mach 15 and strike targets up to 1,400km away, though analysts have cast doubt on these claims, noting that "Fattah 1 hasn't proven itself to be operational or even work" and that "the missiles have not been proven and they are not likely ready for combat."

Though Iran claims Fattah-2 is designed to penetrate advanced missile defenses through unpredictable flight paths, Western analysts have expressed skepticism about its actual capabilities in deterrence calculations.

== See also ==
- Fattah-1
- Hypersonic glide vehicle
- Boeing X-51 Waverider
