= Shahab-3 =

Medium range ballistic missile

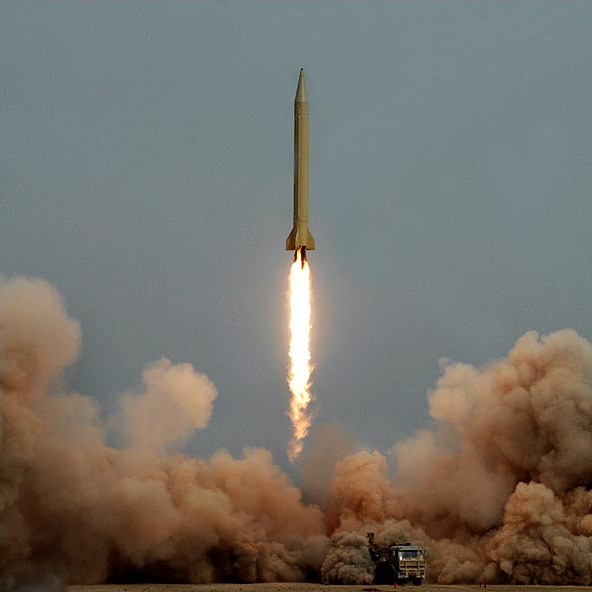
- Type: Strategic MRBM

Service history
- In service: 2003–present
- Used by: Iran

Production history
- Variants: A, B, C, D

Specifications
- Diameter: 1.2 m (3 ft 11 in)
- Warhead: One (1,200 kg or 2,600 lb) at 1,000-2,000 km– five cluster munition warheads in new models (280 kg or 620 lb each), each warhead can target different destinations.
- Engine: Liquid propellant rocket
- Operational range: 1,000 km (620 mi)-2,000 km (1,200 mi) (Shahab-3 ER)
- Flight altitude: 400 km
- Maximum speed: 2.4 km/s at altitude of 10–30 km in final stage which is about Mach 7
- Guidance system: inertial navigation system
- Accuracy: 2,500 m Circular error probable
- Launch platform: Vehicle

The Shahab-3 (Persian: شهاب ۳, romanized: Šahâb 3; meaning "Meteor-3") is a family of liquid-fueled ballistic missiles developed by Iran, under the IRGC, and based upon the North Korean Nodong-1/A and Nodong-B missiles. The Shahab-3 family has a range of 1,000-2,000 kilometres (1,200 mi). It was tested from 1998 to 2003 and added to the military arsenal on 7 July 2003, with an official unveiling by Ayatollah Khamenei on July 20. It has an estimated accuracy of about 2,500m CEP. According to the IAEA, Iran in the early 2000s may have explored various fuzing, arming and firing systems to make the Shahab-3 more capable of reliably delivering a nuclear warhead.

The forerunners to this missile include the Shahab-1 and Shahab-2. Iran's Defense Ministry has alternately denied plans to develop a Shahab-4 and admitted that a Shahab-4 program is in development, having claimed it both to be a MRBM and an SLV. Some successors to the Shahab have longer range and are more maneuverable.

Operating under the Sanam Industrial Group (Department 140), which is part of the Defense Industries Organization of Iran, the Shahid Hemmat Industrial Group (SHIG), led the development of the Shahab missile.

In 2019, the US Defense Intelligence Agency described the Shahab 3 as "the mainstay of Iran’s MRBM force". In June 2017, the US Air Force National Air and Space Intelligence Center estimated that fewer than 50 launchers were operationally deployed.

Shahab-3 missiles are considered obsolete and are being progressively changed for their more recent upgrades of Shahab family missiles, such as the Ghadr-110H and Emad missile. The US government says that the Shahab-3 is "generally" less accurate than the Fateh-110.

== Shahab-3A ==
The range of the Shahab-3A is about 1,300 km (810 mi) or 1,500 kilometres (930 mi). According to The New York Times, the Shahab-3A was no longer in production as of 2008.

== Shahab-3B ==
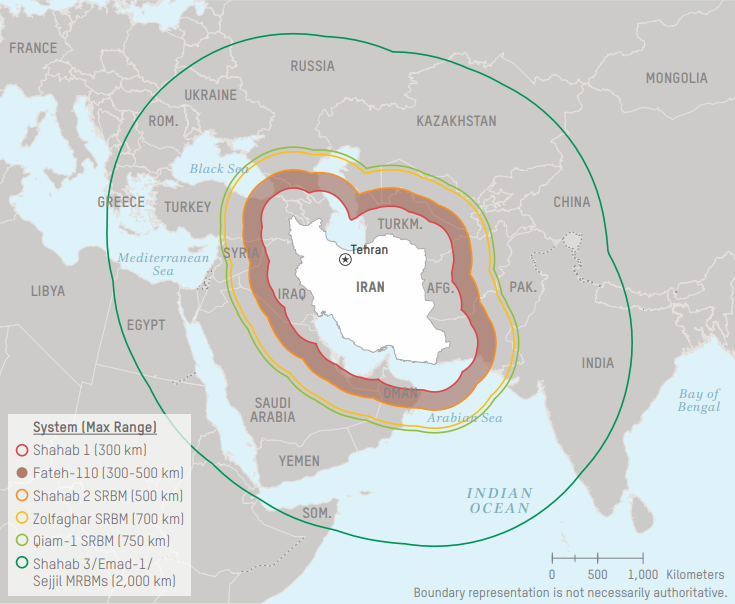
The range of the Shahab-3

The Shahab-3B differs from the basic production variant. It has improvements to its guidance system and a warhead with a greater range, a few small changes on the missile body, and a new re-entry vehicle whose terminal guidance system and rocket-nozzle steering method are completely different from the Shahab-3A's spin-stabilized re-entry vehicle.

The new re-entry vehicle uses a triconic aeroshell geometry, or "baby bottle" design, which improves the overall lift to drag ratio for the re-entry vehicle. This allows greater range maneuverability, which can result in better precision. The triconic design reduces the overall mass of the warhead from an estimated 1 metric ton (2,200 lb) to 700 kg (1,500 lb).

== Shahab-3C and D ==
Little is known about the Shahab-3C and Shahab-3D. From what can be gathered, the missiles have an improved precision, navigation system, and a longer range. The missiles were indigenously developed, and are being mass-produced. In 2008, Iran had a production capacity of 70 units per year.

== Galleries ==
Shahab 3 image gallery

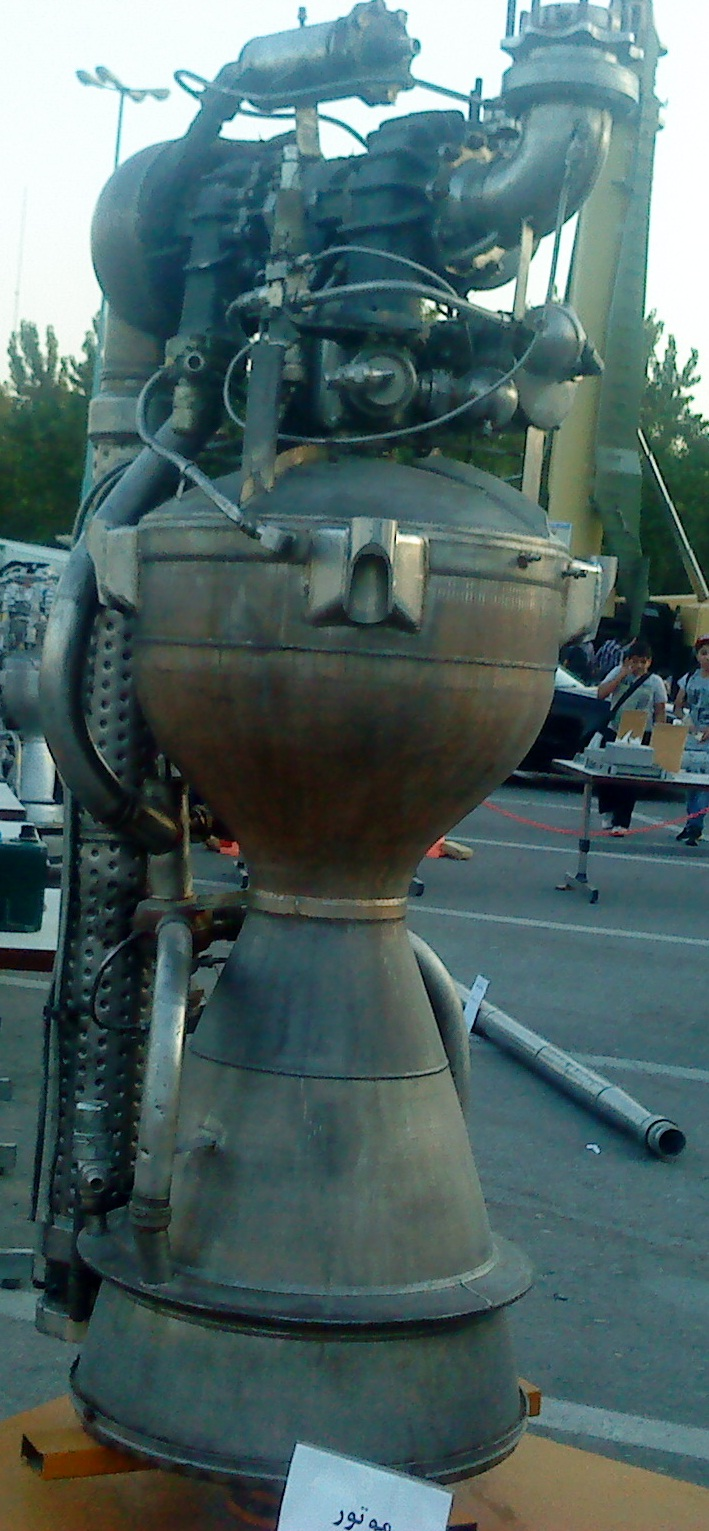
A Shahab 3 engine

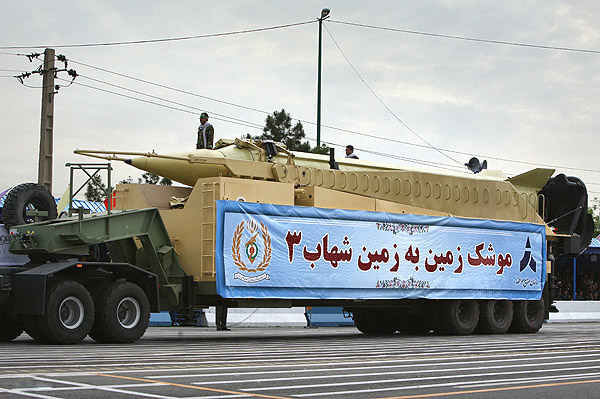
With a truck-mounted launcher, on a Military Day Parade, 2010
Shahab 3 artwork

Artist's conception

Artist's conception

Artist's conception

== History, development and tests ==
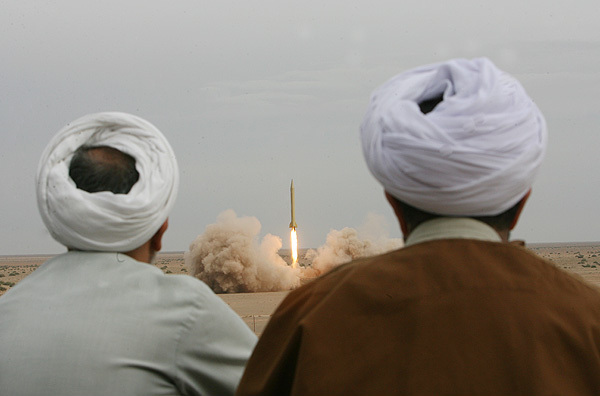
The "Great Prophet II" test, 2 November 2006.

During the early 1990s Iran began to shift from the acquirement of ballistic missiles to their production through a well documented technological partnership with North Korea, despite its denial by Iranian foreign ministry official Hassan Taherian, in February 1995. The main reason for this transition was to minimise the effects of sanctions and interdictions posed by the USA, as well as military embargoes and international actions against Iran. According to Seitz and Cordesman, another possible reason was that more capable long-range missiles are necessary for deploying heavy nuclear weapons, and would allow Iran to threaten targets outside the region, intimidate the US and prevent them from taking military action against Iran.

Based on the designs of the North Korean No-Dong medium range ballistic missile, which some analysts suggest was developed with Iranian financial support, Iran manufactured the Shahab-3. And while Iran claimed that its purpose was to deliver conventional payloads, it is more likely that it was meant to carry biological, chemical and nuclear weapons.

=== Timeline ===
In October 1997 Russia commenced training Iranian engineers in missile production, for the Shahab-3 missile system.

Iran has conducted at least six test flights of the Shahab-3. During the first one, in July 1998, the missile reportedly exploded in mid-air during the latter portion of its flight. U.S. officials wondered whether the test was a failure or the explosion was intentional. A second, successful test, using a North Korean engine, took place in July 2000.

In September 2000, Iran conducted a third test, in which the missile reportedly exploded shortly after launch.

In May 2002, Iran conducted another successful test, leading then-Iranian Defense Minister Ali Shamkhani to say the test improved the Shahab-3's "power and accuracy".

Another successful test reportedly occurred in July 2002.

On 7 July 2003, the foreign ministry spokesman said that Iran had completed a final test of the Shahab 3 "a few weeks ago", that was "the final test before delivering the missile to the armed forces", according to a New York Times report. Additionally, allegations regarding Chinese assistance in resolving the missile's final technical issues began to emerge. Shahab-3 missiles were displayed openly in military parades, production was said to have begun at a rate of several per month and they were introduced into service.

In September 2003 Shahab-3 missiles were displayed on mobile launchers in a military parade and were claimed to have a range of 1000 km.

On 11 August 2004, the design of the Shahab-3 missile was modified (often referred to as Shahab-3M). The "Cone-shaped" warhead was replaced with a smaller "Bottleneck" warhead, the latter having a slower reentry and being advantageous when carrying chemical and biological agents, as well as being more suitable for carrying a nuclear payload. Another variant may include a larger fin, an airframe shorter by 1 m and a range of less than 1500 km.

On 19 September 2004, a subsequent test was conducted, followed by a parade on September 21, 2004, during which missiles were covered in banners proclaiming "We will crush America under our feet."

In November 2004, Shamkhani said Iran could mass-produce the missile.

On 31 May 2005, Shamkhani declared that a new missile motor, using solid fuel technology and capable of carrying a payload of 700 kg over a distance of 1500–2000 km was successfully tested.

In September 2005 two new variants of the Shahab-3, with three metre long triconic ("Baby-bottle") nose-cones, were tested and displayed publicly. Experts are in disagreement with regard to their intended purpose. Some are of the opinion that they are to carry a warhead of the air-burst type, geared toward the dispersal of chemical and biological agents, while others believe it is better suited for a nuclear payload.

On 16 February 2006 it was reported that Iran had successfully test-launched four missiles, one of which was the Shahab-3 with a range of 1300 km and another was the Shahab-4 with a range of 2200 km.

On 7 April 2006 The London Telegraph reported that Iran had modified the nose cone of the Shahab-3 to carry a nuclear warhead such as that manufactured by Pakistan - the designs of which Iran is rumoured to possess.

On 2 November 2006, Iran fired unarmed missiles to begin 10 days of military war games. Iranian state television reported "dozens of missiles were fired including Shahab-2 and Shahab-3 missiles. The missiles had ranges from 300 km (190 mi) to up to 2,000 km (1,200 mi)...Iranian experts have made some changes to Shahab-3 missiles installing cluster warheads in them with the capacity to carry 1,400 bombs". These launches came after some United States-led military exercises in the Persian Gulf on 30 October 2006, meant to train for blocking the transport of weapons of mass destruction.

=== 2008 Great Prophet III test ===
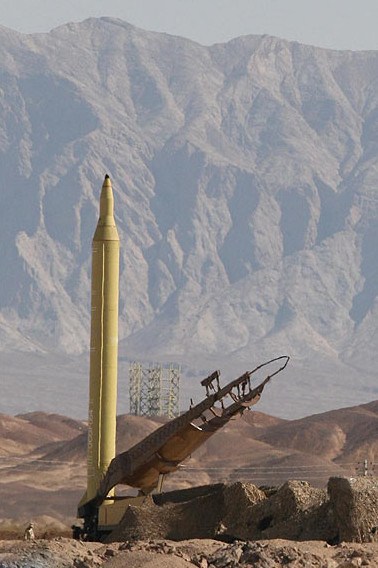
A Shahab-3 on a launcher at Iran's Great Prophet IV military exercise

On 8 July 2008, Iran test fired a non-upgraded version of the Shahab-3, as one of 9 medium- and long-range missiles launched as part of the Great Prophet III exercise.

Other missiles fired include the surface-to-surface Fateh-110 and Zelzal missiles. Islamic Revolutionary Guard Corps air and naval units conducted these tests in a desert location. Air Force commander Hossein Salami said that "Iran was ready to retaliate to military threats... we warn the enemies who intend to threaten us with military exercises and empty psychological operations that our hand will always be on the trigger and our missiles will always be ready to launch".

On 9 July 2008, Iran allegedly tested a version of the Shahab-3 in the Strait of Hormuz, which Iran has threatened to shut down traffic into if it is attacked. Arms control analyst Jeffrey Lewis analyzed Iranian launch footage and concluded that Iranian claims of testing an upgraded Shahab missile were unfounded. A senior Republican Guard commander said Iran would maintain security in the Strait of Hormuz and the Persian Gulf. According to the Israeli newspaper Haaretz and the French news agency Agence France-Presse, which published pictures from the missile test, "Iran had apparently doctored photographs of missile test-firings and exaggerated the capabilities of the weapons", and an additional missile was added afterwards to cover up a failed launch.

=== Later developments ===
The Shahab-3 was reportedly test-fired in December 2016. As of March 2026, Shahab-3 missiles were reportedly stored at Imam Ali Missile Base in Lorestan Province. They are also reportedly stored at Imam Javad Missile Base in Fars Province, which was struck by the combined US and Israeli force in March 2026.

== Operators ==
=== Current operators ===
- Iran
  - Aerospace Force of the Islamic Revolutionary Guard Corps

== See also ==
- Ballistic missile program of Iran
- Islamic Revolutionary Guard Corps
- Iranian military industry
- List of aircraft of the Islamic Revolutionary Guard Corps Aerospace Force
