= Shahab-5 =

Iranian long-range ballistic missile

Shahab-5 (Persian: شهاب ۵, meaning "Meteor-5") is an Iranian long-range ballistic missile, that was rumoured to exist as early as 1998. It is thought to be based upon the North Korean Taepodong-2, with a first stage based upon the Soviet RD-0216. The potential range of the missile is estimated to be between 4,000 and 4,300 km, with a warhead payload of 700 to 1,000 kg.

Some analysts have suggested that Iran’s development of the Shahab‑5 was influenced by cooperation and technology transfers involving North Korean and Russian missile programs in the late 1990s.

== See also ==
- Military of Iran
- Defense industry of Iran
- Equipment of the Iranian Army
