= Shahab-4 =

Unbuilt Iranian rocket

Shahab-4 (IRIS)
- Function: Disputed
- Manufacturer: Iran

The Shahab-4 (Persian: شهاب ۴, meaning "Meteor-4") (a.k.a. IRIS) was an unbuilt Iranian rocket, derived from the Shahab-3 medium-range ballistic missile. According to Iran it was intended to be a space launch vehicle, after a slip by the Defense Minister in which he acknowledged it as a "more capable ballistic missile than the Shahab-3". According to Western observers, it was intended to be part of a nuclear-capable ballistic missile.

== History ==
The IRIS/Shahab-4 project was initiated in 1988, but according to some sources, it never went beyond the drawing board. The design heritage of the IRIS was later incorporated into the Safir.

In 1997, an American satellite captured evidence of a Shahab-4 test facility in Parchin.

In 1999, it was suspected that the Shahab-4 was largely derived from NPO Yuzhnoye's R-12 Dvina, which in its single-stage variant, had a maximum range of 2,000km and a circle of equal probability of 2,400m. The dual-stage R-12 Dvina was capable of lifting payloads into orbit.

== See also ==
- Safir (rocket)
