= Soleimani (tribe) =

Tribe in southern Iran

The Soleimani (Persian: سلیمانی) are a tribe living mainly in southern Iran, specifically around Kerman province. They speak Persian and Turkic and follow Shia Islam.

== History ==
According to Pierre Oberling, the Soleimani tribe of Kerman were a Turkic tribe, and they descended from either the Bolvardi Soleimani tribe in Fars province who migrated to Kerman 300 years earlier, or the Soleimanlu clan of the Baharlu tribe which split 230 years earlier. He added that the Soleimani tribe was divided between sedentary and nomadic, and that they were Shia Muslims who mostly spoke Persian, although some nomadic elements still spoke Turkic, and they numbered around 5,000 individuals. The Soleimani tribe migrated from Fars to Kerman in the 18th century. The tribe was historically led by a khan. The Iranian government historically had very little presence and control among the tribe.

The Soleimani tribe were part of the Mehni tribe of Kerman until the late Qajar period. The clans of the Soleimani tribe included Ibrahimi, Hosseini, Khodaverdi, Alidadi, Alimoradi, Mareki, Mohammadi-Soleimani, Mashhadi-Vali, Mirzakhani, Mirzayi, and Abdolazimi. The Soleimani tribe was mainly concentrated in the central and southern parts of Kerman province. It was one of the main tribes of Kerman.

The Soleimani tribe later came to attention for being the tribe of Qasem Soleimani. His family was from Qanat-e Malek, Kerman, but was originally from Fars, having fought for Nader Shah during campaigns in India and in Afghanistan before settling in Kerman.
