= Hashem Safieddine =

Lebanese Shia cleric (1964–2024)

- هاشم صفي الدين
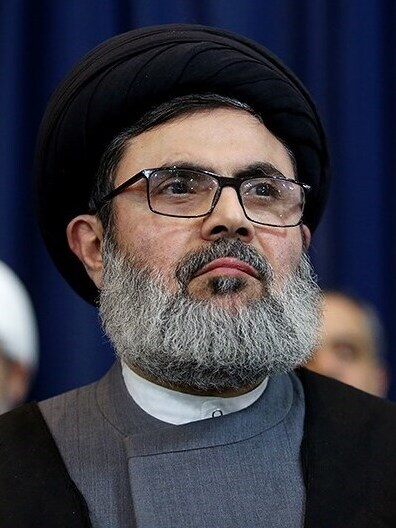
- Safieddine in 2020

Head of Hezbollah's Executive Council
- In office July 2001 – 3 October 2024
- Secretary-General: Hassan Nasrallah; Naim Qassem (acting)
- Succeeded by: Ali Damoush

Personal details
- Born: 1964 Deir Qanoun En Nahr, Lebanon
- Died: 3 October 2024 (aged 59–60) Dahieh, Lebanon
- Cause of death: Assassination by airstrike
- Party: Hezbollah
- Spouse: Raeda Faqih
- Relatives: Hassan Nasrallah (cousin); Zeinab Soleimani (daughter-in-law)

Hashem Safieddine (Note: Arabic: هاشم صفي الدين, romanized: Hāshim Ṣafī al-Dīn) (1964 – 3 October 2024) was a Lebanese Shia cleric who served as the head of Hezbollah's Executive Council from 2001 until his assassination in 2024. A maternal cousin of Hassan Nasrallah, Safieddine was considered the "number two" in Hezbollah for many years. In 2017, he was declared a Specially Designated Global Terrorist by the United States and designated as a terrorist by Saudi Arabia.

Following the 2024 Hezbollah headquarters strike on 27 September 2024, during the Israel–Hezbollah conflict, in which Nasrallah was killed, Safieddine was named as his likely successor. On 3 October 2024, Safieddine was assassinated in an Israeli airstrike in Dahieh, south of Beirut. His death was confirmed later that month.

== Early life ==
Safieddine was born in 1964 in Deir Qanoun En Nahr, southern Lebanon, to a respected Lebanese Shia family. His name is also rendered as Safi al-Din. He was a maternal first cousin of Hassan Nasrallah. He was the brother of Abdallah Safieddine, a key Hezbollah operative based in Tehran.

Safieddine studied theology in Najaf, Iraq and Qom, Iran, together with Nasrallah, until he was recalled to Lebanon by Hassan Nasrallah in 1994, and was groomed by Nasrallah as a successor ever since.

== Career ==
In 1995, Safieddine was promoted to the Majlis al-Shura (Consultative Assembly), the highest council in Hezbollah, after which he operated under Imad Mughniyeh, until the latter's assassination in 2008. He was also appointed head of the Jihad Council. The Executive Council, of which he was president, oversees Hezbollah's political, social, and educational activities.

Until Nasrallah's assassination on 27 September 2024, Safieddine was among the three top leaders of Hezbollah, alongside Nasrallah and Naim Qassem.

In 2006, Safieddine was cited as a possible successor to Nasrallah for the post of Secretary-General of Hezbollah.

Safieddine was one of six clerics who were members of the Shura Council of Hezbollah. He was the head of the executive council of the group, also known as Shura Tanfiziyah, to which he was elected in the general assembly meeting in July 2001. He was one of nine members of the deciding consultative council (Shura al-Qarar), which is the top body of the group.

In October 2008, Safieddine was elected to succeed Nasrallah as secretary general of Hezbollah in the general meeting. He was considered the "number two" figure in the organization. His appointment as heir apparent to Nasrallah was supported by Iranians. In 2009, Safieddine was again elected to the Shura Council. In November 2010, he was appointed Hezbollah's military commander of the Southern Lebanon region.

In May 2017, Safieddine was designated a Specially Designated Global Terrorist by the U.S. Department of State. He was also designated as a terrorist by Saudi Arabia. In May 2018, Safieddine and nine other senior Hezbollah figures (including Nasrallah and Naim Qassem) were sanctioned by the U.S. and several of its Arab allies, including Saudi Arabia, the United Arab Emirates, and Bahrain. In 2020, the U.S. sanctioned two Lebanon-based companies, Arch Consulting and Meamar Construction, which are both subordinate to the Executive Council of Hezbollah, receive guidance and direction from Safieddine and Sultan Khalifah As'ad, and are accused of concealing money transfers to the accounts of Hezbollah leadership, "while the Lebanese people suffer from inadequate services".

After Nasrallah was killed in September 2024 in an Israeli airstrike on the Hezbollah headquarters, Safieddine was in line to succeed him. He was recognized for his similarity to Nasrallah in both appearance and manner of speaking, and for his strong ties with the Iranian regime and the Ayatollah. Upon the announcement of Nasrallah's death, Saudi news outlets Al Arabiya and AlHadath reported that Safieddine had been officially designated as his successor, although Hezbollah denied this via Telegram. Although Qassem was formally Hezbollah's acting leader, after Nasrallah's death, Safieddine assumed control over the organization.

== Assassination ==
Safieddine was designated a terrorist in May 2017 by the United States Department of State and Saudi Arabia for his leadership role in Hezbollah. According to the IDF, there were more than 25 members of Hezbollah's intelligence division inside the command headquarters, including Saeb Ayyash, the air assembly officer in the intelligence division, and Mahmoud Muhammad Shahin, the Hezbollah intelligence division officer in the Syrian branch.

On the night of 3 October 2024, the Israel Defense Forces (IDF) carried out an airstrike on an underground bunker in Dahieh, a predominantly Shia Muslim suburb in the south of Beirut, Lebanon, where Hezbollah leaders, including Safieddine, had convened in the headquarters of Hezbollah's Intelligence Branch. The airstrike targeted an underground bunker at which Hezbollah intelligence chief Hussein Hazimah ("Mortada") was also believed to be located. Hezbollah said that they had lost contact with Saffiedine ever since and that he was missing.

Several days after the attack, his death in the strike was announced by Israeli Defense Minister Yoav Gallant and later Prime Minister Benjamin Netanyahu. On 22 October 2024, the IDF confirmed the killings of Safieddine, Hazimah, and other senior Hezbollah members and that his body had been found. Hezbollah acknowledged his death the next day.

Safieddine's remains were secretly buried in a temporary location before his official funeral ceremony in Beirut on 23 February 2025. He was buried in Deir Qanoun En Nahr the next day.

=== Airstrike ===
In the wider context of the latest Israel–Hezbollah war, at least 11 consecutive bombings took place in Dahieh on that occasion, reportedly targeting a meeting taking place in an underground bunker and consisting of several senior Hezbollah officials, including Safieddine and the group's chief of intelligence, Hussein Ali Hazimeh. It is unclear how many casualties were caused in the attack. The IDF said that the strikes targeted Hezbollah's intelligence headquarters.

Around 73 tons of bombs were dropped on the bunker by the Israeli Air Force, and the strikes were reportedly larger than the attack that killed Hezbollah secretary-general Hassan Nasrallah on 27 September 2024. Footage of the aftermath showed large balls of flame rising from the bunker with thick smoke and flares bursting out. The attack emitted loud bangs and caused buildings to shake.

=== Fate of Hashem Safieddine ===
According to the Israeli Channel 12, Israeli security officials were "increasingly confident" that Safieddine had been killed in the attack.

On 5 October, a Lebanese security source reported that Hezbollah lost contact with Safieddine, and that Hezbollah has not heard from him since the airstrike.

Al Arabiya and Al Hadath reported that Israel confirmed the assassination of Hashem Safieddine and all Hezbollah leaders that were with him. On 8 October, Israeli Defense Minister Yoav Gallant stated that Safieddine was likely "eliminated". The claim was later repeated by Prime Minister Benjamin Netanyahu. On 22 October, the IDF formally announced his killing along with Hussein Hazimeh and 24 other senior Hezbollah members. Hezbollah confirmed Sadieddine's death the following day, and confirmed Hazimeh's death two days later.

=== Analysis ===
According to military analyst Elijah Magnier, the disappearance of Hashem Safieddine will not change Hezbollah's military strategy against Israel because "the team of special forces in the south of Lebanon are fighting independently of the political decision-making in Beirut".

== Personal life ==
Safieddine was married to Raeda Faqih. In June 2020, their eldest son, Reza, married Zeinab Soleimani, the youngest daughter of the Iranian military officer Qasem Soleimani, who had been killed by an American drone strike in Iraq in January of that year.

== See also ==
- Israel–Hezbollah conflict (2023–present)
- Esmail Qaani
