= Zeinab Soleimani =

Daughter of Qassem Soleimani

- زینب سلیمانی
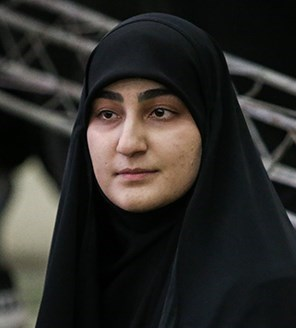
- Soleimani in 2024
- Born: 1991 (age 34–35); Tehran, Iran
- Education: Shahid Beheshti University
- Spouse: Reza Safieddine (m. 2020)
- Father: Qasem Soleimani
- Relatives: Hashem Safieddine (father-in-law)

Zeinab Soleimani (Persian: زینب سلیمانی; born 1991) is an Iranian political activist who manages the Qasem Soleimani Foundation International. She is the youngest daughter of Qasem Soleimani, the former commander of the Quds Force of the Iranian Islamic Revolutionary Guard Corps (IRGC).

She studied political science at and graduated from Shahid Beheshti University in Tehran, Iran. Zeinab was the liaison between Soleimani and the families of Iranian military forces who were killed in the Iran-Iraq War and in wars in Iraq, Syria, and other countries in the region. She also traveled with her father to Syria, Iraq, and Lebanon on several occasions.

Soleimani is subject to sanctions on the Canadian Consolidated Autonomous Sanctions List.

== Personal life ==
Zeinab was born in Tehran, Iran, and is the youngest child of Qasem Soleimani, the former commander of the Quds Force of the Iranian Islamic Revolutionary Guard Corps. She spoke at her father's funeral, saying: "the families of American soldiers in West Asia will be waiting for the news of the deaths of their children."

In 2019, after actress Saba Kamali called the "Blue Girl", who self-immolated to protest the Iranian laws banning females from attending sports events and entering stadiums since the Iranian Revolution, more oppressed than Hussein ibn Ali (grandson of the Prophet) and his companions, Zeinab Soleimani reacted strongly on Instagram. Subsequently, Soleimani's Instagram account was blocked.

Shortly after her father's death, in June 2020, she married Reza Safieddine, the eldest son of Hashem Safieddine, the head of Hezbollah's Executive Council. The news of their marriage was first published on Instagram by the sister of Imad Mughniyeh's, the founding member of Lebanon's Islamic Jihad Organization and number two in Hezbollah's leadership. Unlike his father and wife, Reza Safieddine avoids interviews with the media and news cameras. The timing of their marriage surprised some people in Iran, as marriages are normally avoided in Iran before the first death anniversary of a close family member.

== Political life ==
Zeinab Soleimani is part of the Islamic Republic of Iran's media narrative about her father. Even before Qasem Soleimani's death, Zeinab was the only child of his who appeared in public. For instance, in 2016, a video of her appearance alongside Fatima Mughniyeh, daughter of Imad Mughniyeh, in a program was released.

Zeinab is one of the few women who has been able to speak before the Friday prayer sermons and deliver a speech at the Tehran Friday prayer platform. She was the speaker at her father's funeral ceremony at the University of Tehran, and two weeks after her father's death, she delivered a speech before the Friday prayer sermons in Kerman while holding a weapon.

== Qasem Soleimani Foundation ==
Zeinab is the director of the "Qasem Soleimani Foundation," known as the "Haj Qasem School," which was formed after her father's assassination to preserve and publish the works of Qasem Soleimani. The allocation of an 8.5 billion toman budget for this foundation in Iran's 2021 budget was criticized. Shortly after this news was published, Zeinab Soleimani wrote in a letter that she had not requested a budget.

On December 6, 2020, the public relations department of the Budget and Planning Organization announced that the budget line for this foundation in 2020 was added to the text of the law by the parliament during the review of the 2020 budget in the IRGC budget section. This budget was 10 billion tomans in 2020.
