= Kuweires offensive =

2015 Offensive Military Operation

- Part of the Battle of Aleppo and the Syrian Civil War
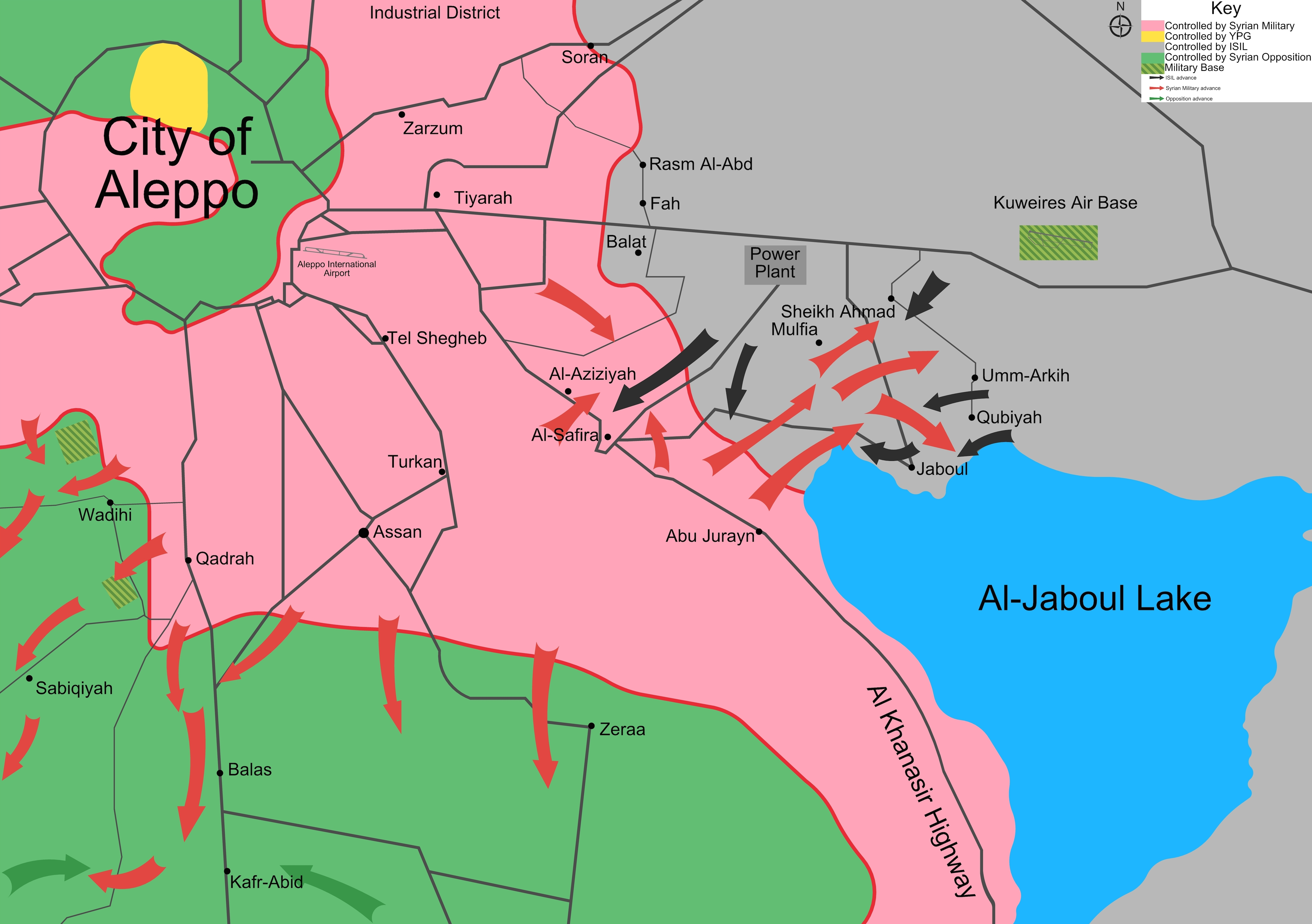
- Map of the Southern Aleppo offensive to the west, and the Kuweires offensive to the east, from September to late October 2015
Date	14 September – 16 November 2015 (2 months and 2 days)
Location	Aleppo, Syria
Result	Syrian government victory: Syrian Army lifts the airbase siege on 10 November; Syrian Army reaches the Aleppo–Raqqa Highway; Syrian Army captured close to 50 villages during their offensive

Belligerents
(Syria) Syrian Arab Republic: Syrian Armed Forces; National Defence Forces; Iran: IRGC; Quds Force; IRGC Ground Forces; Hezbollah; Ba'ath Brigades; Harakat Hezbollah al-Nujaba Air strikes: Russia: Aerospace Forces	Islamic State

Commanders and leaders
(Iran) Maj. Gen. Qasem Soleimani (Chief strategist) (Iran) Maj. Gen. Hossein Hamadani † (Deputy commander) (Syria) Maj. Gen. Munzer Zammam (Kuweires Airport chief commander) (Syria) Gen. Hasham Mohamed Younis (Kuweires Airport sub-commander) (Syria) Col. Suhayl al-Hasan (Tiger Forces commander) (Syria) Col. Muhammad Shahen (Cheetah Forces commander) (Syria) Col. Lu'ayy Sleitan (Cheetah Forces commander); Akram al-Kaabi (Leader of al-Nujaba) (Russia) Aleksandr Dvornikov (Commander of Russian Forces) (Russia) Viktor Bondarev (Commander of Russian Aerospace Forces)	(Islamic State) Umar Al-Absi (ISIL chief commander of Aleppo) (Islamic State) Abu Mu'awiya Al-Halabi (ISIL senior commander)

Units involved
Syrian Army: Tiger Forces; Cheetah Forces; Cheetah Forces Team 6; Qalamoun Shield Forces; Syrian Air Force; Aerospace Forces: Sukhoi Su-25SMs; Naval Infantry advisors: 810th Naval Infantry Brigade	Military of ISIL

Strength
314 (Kuweires Airport, out of original 1,000–1,100); ~4,500 (reinforcements)	Unknown

Casualties and losses
78 killed, 200+ wounded	80+ killed

On 14 September 2015, the Syrian Arab Army (SAA) – in cooperation with the National Defence Forces (NDF) and the Al-Ba'ath Battalion – launched a fresh offensive inside the Aleppo Governorate's southeastern countryside in order to lift the Islamic State's (ISIS) two-year-long siege of the isolated Kuweires Military Airbase. This offensive was later complemented by another effort starting mid-October further south, which would be aimed at cementing government control over the main logistical route to Aleppo from central Syria.

The main objective of the offensive was to lift the siege on the Kuweires Military Airport, and relieve the hundreds of soldiers locked into the Kuweires pocket for almost three years, as well as to give significant depth to the main line of communication to the Syrian and allied forces in the province from the south. Also there is a possible long-term goal of cutting the Aleppo–Raqqah highway and thereby bisecting ISIL in Syria.

== Preparations ==
The origins of the planning of operations in the Aleppo area could be traced back to Gen. Qasem Soleimani's visit to Moscow in July 2015. Gen. Soleimani was reportedly sent to Syria by the supreme leader of Iran himself, Ali Khamenei, in order to discuss military matters with his Russian counterparts and coordinate a joint escalation of forces in Syria.

Military advisers, including high ranking generals from Iran's Quds force began deploying to Latakia, and soon moving to the points of engagement throughout the country in order to plan the coming ground offensives which would be augmented by Russian air-power. With so many Iranian generals patrolling and reconnoitering the front-lines of the Syrian civil war, three of the aforementioned were soon killed in action including a very senior Guards member, Gen. Hossein Hamadani, who was deputy to Qasem Soleimani.

== The offensive ==
The situation at the airport at the beginning of the offensive.

Beginning on 15 September, the government forces launched attacks along the north-western rim of the al-Jaboul Lake in an attempt to drive the ISIL militants back towards the besieged air-base of Kuweires in eastern Aleppo. The offensive began with the Army and National Defense Forces taking control of the two hilltops at Tal Na'am and Tal Sab'in, which are located just north of Lake Jabboul.

However, ISIL was able to regroup not long after and launch a counter-attack in which they gained some of their lost territory and checked the rapid advance of the government forces. On 22 September, the intervention of the Syrian Air force enabled the ground forces to regain the initiative and continue their advance by capturing Salihiyah after sharp engagements with ISIL militants around the town and later gain Tal-Rayman in the drive east towards Kuweires.

Before dawn of 24 September 2015, the Russian Naval Infantry went into battle for the first time since their deployment to Syria, Debka file's military and intelligence sources reveal. The 810th Naval Infantry Brigade fought with Syrian Army and Hezbollah special forces in an attack on ISIL forces at the Kweiris air base, east of Aleppo.

On 4 October, the Russian Air Force attacked ISIS along the Dayr Hafir Highway, and the Thermal Plant. This allowed the government forces to enter the village of Ayn Sabil. A Syrian Army source claimed that 75 militants in the Aleppo governorate were killed in Russian airstrikes in the past two days.

On 16 October, government forces and Iraqi militia, reportedly captured the town of Al-Nasiriyah, following fighting that they claimed killed 25 ISIS fighters. They then advanced to the town of Barayjeh, some 7 km from Kuweires.

On 17 October, the military reportedly captured the village of Huwaija. By the next day, government forces took more areas, bringing the total of captured villages since the start of the offensive to five.

On 19 October, government forces captured the village of Bkayze, about seven kilometres from the air base, as well as two other villages near the base. They also captured parts of Dakwanah. The following day, the military seized parts of the Tal Sbi'ein area.

On 21 October, government forces took control of the Tal Sbi'ein area, including its hill, and two days later Dakwanah as well, bringing them to within four kilometers of the air base.

On 9 November, government forces captured the town of Sheikh Ahmad, two kilometers from the air base, setting the conditions for a final assault towards the airport.

The situation at the airport at the end of the offensive.

On 10 November, government forces lifted the siege of the Kuweires air base after three years. Subsequently, the Army captured the villages of Rasm 'Abboud and 'Umm Arkileh near the airport, as a mass ISIL retreat from areas east of Aleppo. On the next day, the military, in coordination with its allies, captured the villages Jdaydet Arbin and Arbid in the vicinity of the Kuweires airbase.

In the last 24 hours of the fighting around the military airport, 60 ISIL militants, more than 20 Syrian soldiers, 13 Iranian and 8 Hezbollah fighters were killed.

On 13 November, government forces advanced 4.5 km along the Aleppo-Raqqa Highway, seizing the chemical production facility and positioned themselves at the Sisako Factory. On 16 November, the air base was officially declared secured after the Army seized the village of Kaskays. This marked the beginning of a new military offensive with the aim of expanding the buffer zone around the airport.

== See also ==
- Aleppo offensive (October–December 2015)
- Battle of Aleppo (2012–2016)
- Operation Northern Storm
- Operation Canopus Star
- Operation Rainbow
