= Ali Damoush =

Lebanese Shia cleric (born 1962)

- علي دعموش
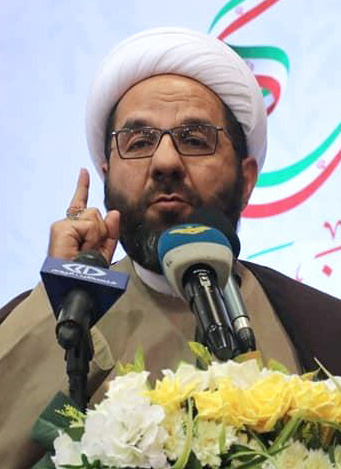
- Damoush in 2019

2nd Head of Hezbollah's Executive Council
- Incumbent
- Assumed office October 3, 2024
- Preceded by: Hashem Safieddine

Personal details
- Born: Sheikh Ali Damoush; 1962 (age 63) Insariyeh, Lebanon
- Party: Hezbollah (since 1994)
- Education: Islamic Sharia Institute

Sheikh Ali Damoush (Arabic: علي دعموش; born 1962) is a Lebanese Shia cleric and current head of Hezbollah's Executive Council. He took over the position after the previous head Hashem Safieddine, was assassinated on October 3, 2024. He was in charge of Hezbollah's External Relations Unit before that, and it is possible that he was still fulfilling this role as an additional charge. (Note: Damoush was also originally deputy head of Hezbollah's Executive Council.)

Various reports indicate the appointment of Damoush as the new head of Hezbollah's Executive Council, one stating "It was clear, noting that [he] was deputy head of Hezbollah's Executive Council in 1998."

== Early life and education ==
Damoush was born on 1962 (Note: The original day and month of Damoush's birthday is unclear due to the lack of information provided by him, somehow keeping it secret.) in Akkar, Lebanon, and lived a traditional home with a father who was very knowledgeable in Islam and a mother from the Alawite community.

Following the civil war in Lebanon in 1977, he relocated to Najaf for his studies. He spent approximately two months at the Al-Adariyya religious school before Saddam Hussein’s regime arrested and deported him to Lebanon. The regime took Damoush, along with several Lebanese students, to study religion at the Najaf Security Center. From there, they took him to Baghdad Prison, where he spent eleven days before deporting him to Lebanon.

Damoush graduated from the Islamic Sharia Institute in Beirut, and a few months after the victory of the Islamic Revolution in Iran under the leadership of Imam Khomeini in 1979, he emigrated to the city of Qom to continue his studies at the seminary, where he stayed at the school of Imam Tzadik and studied with a group of Lebanese scholars.

Damoush lived at the college in Qom for about fourteen years, from 1979 to the end of 1993, during which time he was busy acquiring knowledge, teaching Shiite Islam, writing, and conducting da’wah (call to Islam) tours in Iran, Lebanon, and Africa.

== Career ==
At the beginning of 1994, Damoush returned to Lebanon permanently and joined the Islamic Sharia Institute, where he served on its administrative and scientific body until 1997. That same year, he also became a member of Hezbollah.

Within Hezbollah, Damoush held several positions. From 1994 to 1998, he serves as a judge in Hezbollah’s sharia courts. In 1998, he joined the Executive Council, overseeing the Culture Unit until 2001, after which he led the External Relations Unit.

Damoush served as deputy to Hashem Safieddine, the previous head of the Executive Council, until Safi al-Din's assassination on October 3, 2024. Following this event, Damoush was appointed as the second head of Hezbollah's Executive Council.

== Involvement in the Israel conflict ==
Currently, Damoush is involved in the ongoing conflict between Lebanon and Israel, emphasising that Israel threats are ineffective against Lebanon's strong resistance. He has stated that adversaries aim to weaken Hezbollah's political influence and mobilize opposition against it. He also warned that retaliatory actions by the Lebanese resistance in response to Israeli aggression and assassinations of resistance figures would exceed Israel's expectations.

== See also ==
- Israel–Hezbollah conflict (2023–present)
