= Qasem Soleimani =

Iranian military officer (1957–2020)

Shaheed Sardar Qasem Soleimani
- قاسم سلیمانی
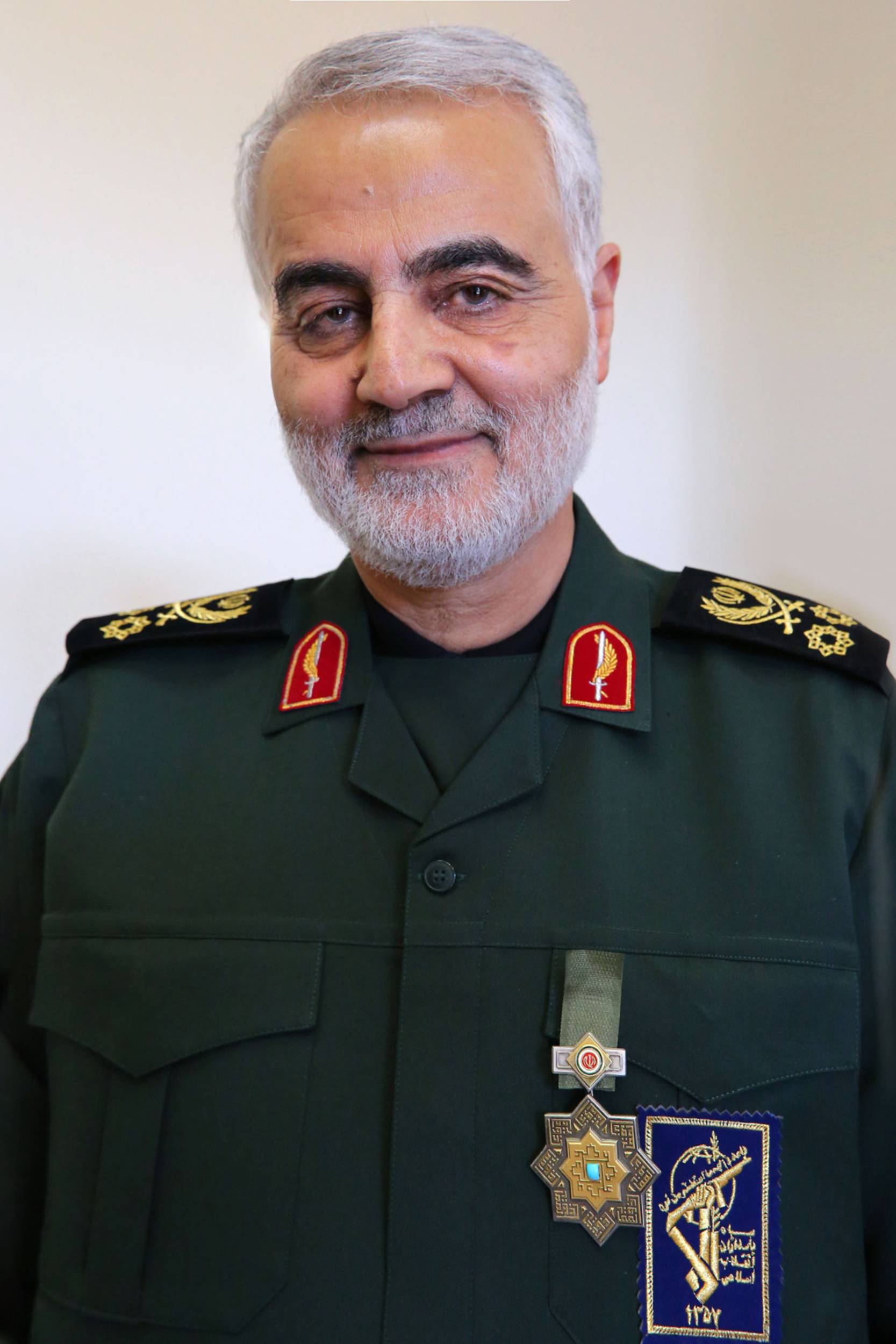
- Soleimani in 2019

2nd Commander of the Quds Force
- In office 21 March 1998 – 3 January 2020
- President: Mohammad Khatami; Mahmoud Ahmadinejad; Hassan Rouhani
- Supreme Leader: Ali Khamenei
- Preceded by: Ahmad Vahidi
- Succeeded by: Esmail Qaani

Personal details
- Born: 11 March 1957 (Note: The most widely cited birth date for Soleimani is 11 March 1957. His gravestone states 21 March 1956. At least one later source states 21 March 1958.) Qanat-e Malek, Kerman, Pahlavi Iran
- Died: 3 January 2020 (aged 62) Baghdad, Iraq
- Cause of death: Assassination by drone strike
- Resting place: Kerman Martyrs Cemetery, Kerman, Iran; 30.291984°N 57.128931°E
- Relations: Hashem Safieddine (co-father-in-law)
- Children: 6 (including Zeinab)
- Occupation: Military officer
- Awards: Order of Zolfaghar (1); Order of Fath (3)
- Nicknames: Haji Qassem (حاج قاسم) (Supporters); The Shadow Commander (Western)

Military service
- Allegiance: Iran
- Branch/service: Islamic Revolutionary Guard Corps
- Years of service: 1979–2020
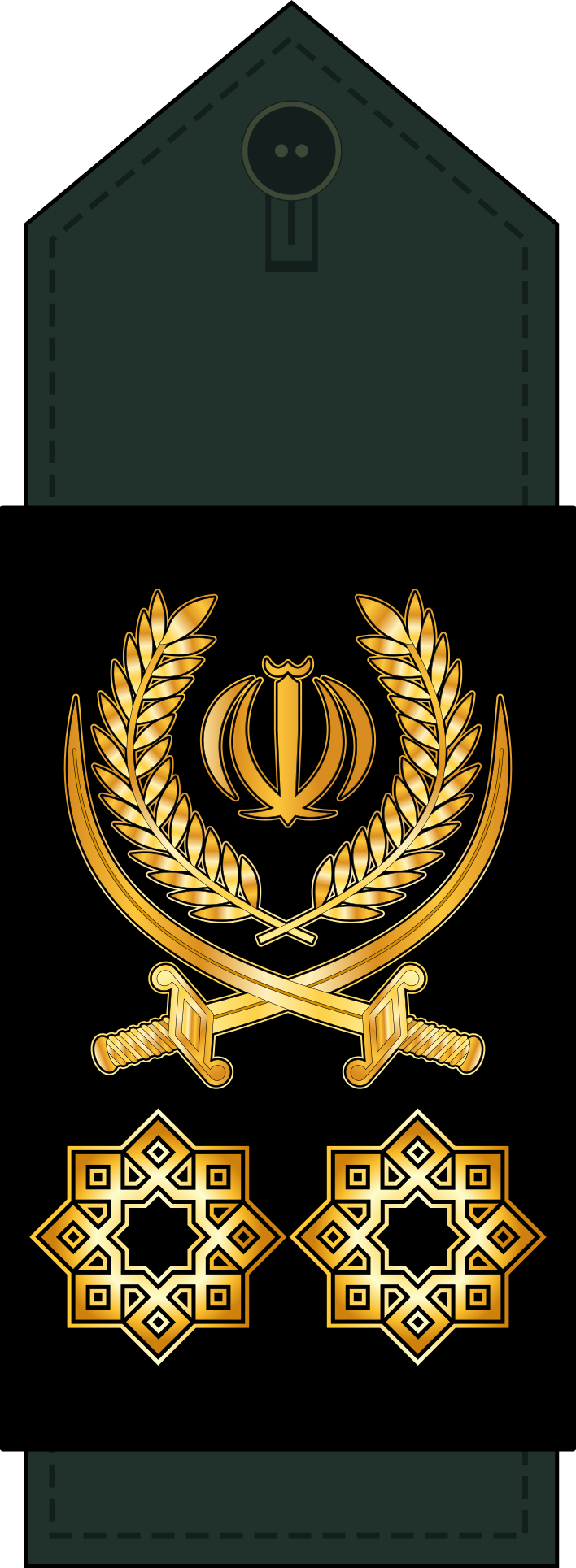
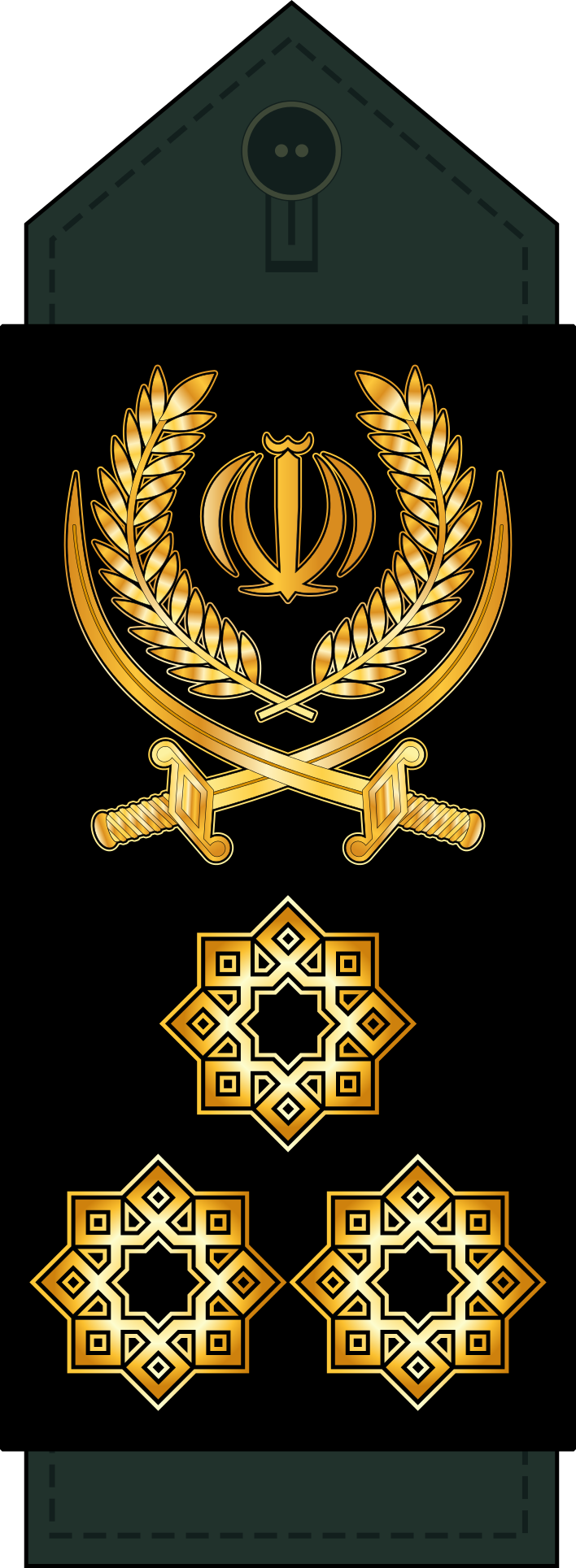
- Rank: Major General; Lieutenant General (posthumously)
- Unit: Quds Force
- Commands: Quds Headquarters (1997–?); 41st Tharallah Division (1982–1997)
- Battles/wars: 1979 Kurdish Rebellion; Iran–Iraq War; Operation Tariq al-Quds (WIA); Operation Fath ol-Mobin; Operation Beit ol-Moqaddas; Second Battle of Khorramshahr; Operation Ramadan; Operation Before the Dawn; Operation Dawn; Operation Dawn 3; Operation Dawn 4; Operation Dawn 5; Operation Dawn 6; Battle of the Marshes; Operation Kheibar; Operation Badr; First Battle of al-Faw; Operation Dawn 8; Operation Karbala 1; Operation Karbala 4; Operation Karbala 5; Operation Karbala 6; Operation Karbala 10; Operation Dawn 10; Second Battle of al-Faw; Operation Mersad; KDPI Insurgency; South Lebanon conflict; War in Afghanistan; American invasion of Afghanistan; 2001 Herat uprising; 2006 Lebanon War; Iran–Israel proxy conflict; Gaza–Israel conflict; Syrian civil war; Battle of al-Qusayr; Southern Syria offensive; Battle of Zabadani; Northwestern Syria offensive; Latakia offensive; Kuweires offensive; Battle of Aleppo; Southern Aleppo offensive; Special forces operation to rescue Russian pilot; East Aleppo offensive; Northern Aleppo offensive; Encirclement of Aleppo; Aleppo offensive; Hama offensive; Syrian Desert campaign; Eastern Syria campaign; 2017 Abu Kamal offensive; War in Iraq (2013–2017); Siege of Amirli; Liberation of Jurf Al Sakhar; Battle of Baiji; Battle of Tikrit; Siege of Fallujah; Battle of Fallujah; 2019–2021 Persian Gulf crisis X

Qasem Soleimani (Persian: قاسم سلیمانی, romanized: Qâsem Soleymâni; 11 March 1957 – 3 January 2020) was an Iranian military officer who served as the 2nd commander of the Quds Force from March 1998 until his assassination by the United States in January 2020. (Note: The Quds Force is one of the branches of the Islamic Revolutionary Guard Corps (IRGC) that is primarily responsible for extraterritorial and clandestine military operations, and they played a key role in the Syrian civil war through securing Russian intervention.) He was described as "the single most powerful operative in the Middle East" and a "genius of asymmetric warfare". Former Mossad director Yossi Cohen said Soleimani's strategies had "personally tightened a noose around Israel's neck".

In his later years, he was considered by some analysts to be the right-hand man of the supreme leader of Iran, Ali Khamenei, and the second-most powerful person in Iran behind Khamenei. For attacks orchestrated or attempted against Americans and other targets abroad, Soleimani was personally sanctioned by the United Nations and the European Union, and was designated as a terrorist by the United States in 2005.

Soleimani was assassinated in a targeted drone strike ordered by U.S. president Donald Trump on 3 January 2020 in Baghdad, Iraq. Iranian government officials publicly mourned Soleimani's death and launched missiles against U.S. military bases in Iraq, wounding 110 American troops. Iranian outlets subsequently represented Soleimani as a national hero.

== Early life ==
Soleimani was born on 11 March 1957, in the village of Qanat-e Malek, Kerman Province. (Note: In a 2007 memo, the U.S. State Department listed his birthplace as Qom, Qom Province, instead.) His family belonged to the Soleimani tribe and descended from Khamseh warriors from Fars who fought for Nader Shah in India and Afghanistan before settling around Kerman. He also claimed to have Lur origin. He left school at the age of 13 and moved to the city of Kerman to work on a construction site to help repay his father's agricultural debts. In 1975, he began working as a contractor for the Kerman Water Organization. When not at work, he spent his time with weight training in local gyms, athletic clubs that centered their ethos around the traditional religious concept of chivalry (javānmardi), Soleimani becoming proficient in karate and working as a fitness coach for some time. He also attended the sermons of Hojjat Kamyab, a preacher and a protégé of Ali Khamenei, who according to Soleimani encouraged him to "revolutionary activities".

== Early military career (1979–1998) ==
Soleimani joined the Revolutionary Guard (IRGC) in 1979 following the Iranian Revolution, which saw the overthrow of the Shah and Ayatollah Khomeini take power. Reportedly, his training was minimal, but he advanced rapidly. Early in his career as a guardsman, he helped to prevent a Kurdish uprising in northwestern Iran. Soleimani gained much experience in Iranian Kurdistan which later benefitted him as he became an advisor for the Peshmerga against Saddam Hussein during the Iran–Iraq War.

"I entered the [Iran–Iraq War] on a fifteen-day mission, and ended up staying until the end ... We were all young and wanted to serve the revolution." – Qasem Soleimani

On 22 September 1980, when Saddam Hussein launched an invasion of Iran, setting off the Iran–Iraq War (1980–1988), Soleimani joined the battlefield serving as the leader of a military company, consisting of men from Kerman whom he assembled and trained. He quickly earned a reputation for bravery, and rose through the ranks because of his role in successful operations to retake the lands Iraq had occupied, and eventually became the commander of the 41st Tharallah Division while still in his 20s, participating in most of the war's battles and major operations. He was mostly stationed at the southern front. He was seriously injured in Operation Tariq-ol-Qods. In a 1990 interview, he mentioned Operation Fath-ol-Mobin as "the best" operation he participated in and "very memorable", due to its difficulties yet positive outcome. He was also engaged in leading and organizing irregular warfare missions deep inside Iraq by the Ramadan Headquarters. It was at this point that Soleimani established relations with Kurdish Iraqi leaders and the Shia Badr Organization, both opposed to Saddam Hussein.

On 17 July 1985, Soleimani opposed the IRGC leadership's plan to deploy forces to two islands in western Arvand Rud, on the Shatt al-Arab River. In 1987, a division that Soleimani commanded was shelled with artillery containing chemical weapons by the Iraqi Army.

After the war, during the 1990s, he was an IRGC commander in Kerman Province. In this region, which is relatively close to Afghanistan, Afghan-grown opium travels to Turkey and on to Europe. Soleimani's military experience helped him earn a reputation as a successful fighter against drug trafficking.

Soleimani went to Mecca and Medina for Hajj with Commander Mahmood Khaleqi in 1992.

During the 1999 student protests in Tehran, Soleimani was one of the IRGC officers who signed a letter to President Mohammad Khatami warning that if he did not suppress the protests, the military would, and suggesting Khatami would be deposed. According to the former IRGC commander, Mohammad Ali Jafari, Soleimani also intervened in the 2009 protests to "control the insecurity and riots".

== Commander of the Quds Force (1998–2020) ==
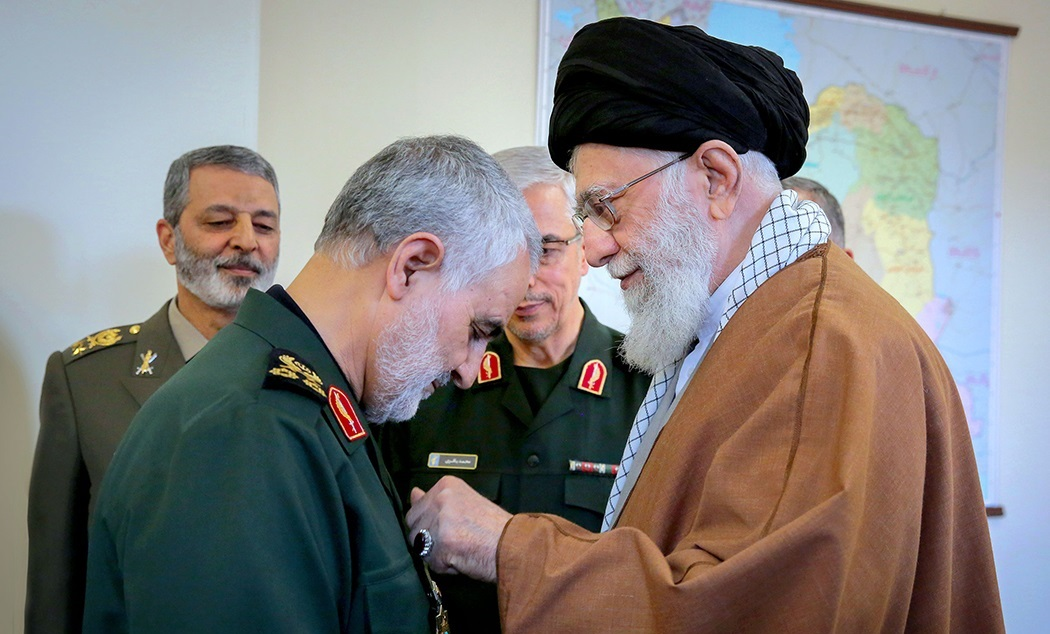
Soleimani receiving the Order of Zolfaghar from Ayatollah Ali Khamenei

According to Dexter Filkins, Soleimani became the commander of the Quds Force, named after the Persian word for Jerusalem, in 1998. According to Ali Alfoneh, Soleimani was appointed as the commander of the IRGC's Quds Force between 10 September 1997 and 21 March 1998. Soleimani strengthened the relationship between Quds Force and Hezbollah upon his appointment, and supported the latter by sending in operatives to assist in forcing Israel's withdrawal and the end to the Israeli occupation of Southern Lebanon.

According to the Jerusalem Center for Public Affairs, an Israeli think tank, Soleimani "directed a network of insurgent groups in Iraq that killed over a thousand Americans." The Israeli think tank also claimed the Quds Force, also known as the Jerusalem Force, was reported by National Council of Resistance of Iran sources to The Telegraph to control a company that "specializes in anti-tank mines and operates under the aegis of the IRGC's al-Quds or Jerusalem Force" and was responsible for making bombs that killed American and British soldiers in Iraq starting in 2005. The Washington Post's Alex Horton reported that the Quds Force provided explosively formed penetrator "training and logistics to militants in Iraq". Defense One reported that a spokesperson from the United States Central Command claimed more than 500 American soldiers were killed by EFPs and other Iranian weapons in the Iraq War and attributed the presence of EFPs in Iraq to the Quds Force. The Pentagon later revised down this figure to 196, and a spokesperson for U.S. Senator Ted Cruz revised his statement accordingly, declining to comment because it was "immaterial" toward the question of "receiv[ing] sanctions relief to the tune of millions of dollars". Weisgerber also cited Columbia Journalism Review, debunking the notion that Iran was exclusively supplying the weapons, though leaving the door open for it providing help in terms of training and technology. Further, in 2006, Common Dreams reported not only that the U.S. military command knew that domestic production had been going on "for years" at the time of accusation against the Quds Force, they also "had considerable evidence that the Mahdi Army had gotten the technology and the training on how to use it from Hezbollah rather than Iran", in line with Hezbollah's claim of autonomy. The Mahdi Army Shia militant group had spearheaded the 2004 Iraq spring fighting.

Soleimani played a role in advising Hezbollah for its defense from Israel in the 2006 Lebanon War and at least once accompanied Imad Mughniyeh. In an interview aired in October 2019, he said he was in Lebanon during the 2006 Israel–Hezbollah War to manage the conflict.

On 11 January 2007, the United States raided the Iranian Liaison Office in Erbil, Iraq, believing that IRGC Commander-in-Chief Mohammad Ali Jafari and Soleimani were there, and detained five Iranians with diplomatic passports.

Nine days later, on 20 January, "an al-Qaida-linked Sunni militant group" or "illegally armed militia group", reported by Dexter Filkins to be Asa'ib Ahl al-Haq, with the Iran-trained Hezbollah commander Ali Musa Daqduq, infiltrated the U.S. Army's Karbala Provincial Joint Coordination Headquarters and killed five American soldiers, in what was reported as "perhaps the boldest and most sophisticated" attack of the Iraq War. The attackers were wearing American uniforms and had American weapons. Following the attack, a U.S. Department of Defense official, major general Kevin Bergner, claimed the Quds Force had knowledge of and planned the attack. On the same day, 13 American soldiers died in a helicopter crash and seven others were killed throughout Iraq, making it the third worst day for U.S. troops during the entire war. Soleimani was considered one of the possible successors to the post of commander of the IRGC when General Yahya Rahim Safavi left this post in 2007. In 2008, he led a group of Iranian investigators looking into the death of Imad Mughniyeh. Soleimani helped arrange a ceasefire between the Iraqi Army and Mahdi Army in March 2008.

Soleimani was described by an ex-CIA operative, responsible for clandestine operations, as "the single most powerful operative in the Middle East today" and the principal military strategist and tactician in Iran's effort to deter Western influence and promote the expansion of Shia and Iranian influence throughout the Middle East. According to General David Petraeus, who served as the US commander of the Multi-National Force in Iraq, Soleimani claimed in 2008 that he was personally responsible for the policy of Iran when it came to IRGC operations in Iraq, Syria, Afghanistan, southern Lebanon and in Gaza. In a 2024 analysis for The Washington Institute for Near East Policy, Jaber Rajabi argued that Soleimani managed allied militias through personal networks and direct relationships with commanders, and that his successor, Esmail Qaani, lacked the same personal authority. In Iraq, as the commander of the Quds Force, he was believed to have strongly influenced the organization of the Iraqi government, notably supporting the election of previous Iraqi Prime Minister Nuri Al-Maliki.

In 2009, The Economist stated on the basis of a leaked report that Christopher R. Hill and General Raymond T. Odierno (America's two most senior officials in Baghdad at the time) met with Soleimani in the office of Iraq's president, Jalal Talabani, but withdrew the story after Hill and Odierno denied the meeting had occurred.

On 24 January 2011, Soleimani was promoted to the rank of major general (Sarlashkar) by Supreme Leader Ali Khamenei. Khamenei was described as having a close relationship with him, calling Soleimani a "living martyr" and helping him financially.

According to the American government-funded Radio Free Europe/Radio Liberty, the IRGC-managed Fars News Agency reported in January 2020 that Soleimani and the Quds Force were involved in many foreign conflicts including "pressuring occupiers in Iraq and Afghanistan to leave the region" and suppressing Syrian street protests against Bashar al-Assad.

=== U.S. invasion of Afghanistan ===
In 1998, Soleimani played a role in diffusing the crisis between Iran and the Taliban-ruled Islamic Emirate of Afghanistan caused by the 8 August 1998 killing of Iranian diplomats in Afghanistan and the 1998 Mazar-i-Sharif massacre of Hazara Shias by the Taliban. While the Commander-in-Chief of the Islamic Revolutionary Guard Corps, Yahya Rahim Safavi, advocated for an Iranian invasion of Afghanistan to topple the Taliban regime, Soleimani convinced Supreme Leader Ali Khamenei that a policy of "strategic patience" would be more fruitful. Soleimani instead tripled Iranian support for the anti-Taliban Northern Alliance and his Quds Force ran a secret training camp in Tajikistan for its fighters.

Following the September 11 attacks in 2001, senior U.S. State Department official Ryan Crocker flew to Geneva to meet with Iranian diplomats who were under the leadership of Soleimani with the purpose of collaborating to destroy the Taliban. When the United States invaded Afghanistan in October 2001 after the September 11 attacks, Soleimani's Quds Force collaborated with U.S. forces and led the 2001 uprising in Herat against the Taliban, which included the Hazaras, Northern Alliance and Quds Force staging an uprising that liberated the city before U.S. forces came in. This collaboration was instrumental in defining the targets of air bombing operations in Afghanistan and in capturing key Al-Qaeda operatives, but ended in January 2002, when President George W. Bush named Iran as part of the "axis of evil" in his State of the Union address. According to the British author Adrian Levy, Soleimani sheltered al-Qaeda "fighters" and "senior members of its military council".

=== Relationship with Hezbollah in Lebanon ===
Hezbollah Secretary-General Hassan Nasrallah said that Soleimani first came to Lebanon in 1998.

On 12 July 2006, Hezbollah, under the operational command of Imad Mughniyeh and Khalid Bazzi, launched a cross-border raid into Israel, killing three IDF soldiers and taking two hostages. Israel responded by invading Lebanon. Soleimani on that day was in Damascus, but went to Beirut under intense Israeli bombing and throughout the course of the war stayed in Dahieh alongside Hezbollah's Secretary-General Nasrallah and military chief Imad Mughniyeh, forming a three-man command to supervise all of Hezbollah's operations during the war.

=== Support for Palestinian armed groups ===
A letter to Mohammed Deif

Defending Palestine is an honor for the Islamic Republic of Iran and Iran will not renounce and give up its duty for the benefit of the world. Palestinians are our friends and enemies of Palestine are our enemies and this is and will be our policy.

Following Israel and Egypt's imposition of a blockade on the Gaza Strip in 2007, the Iranian Quds Force, led by Qasem Soleimani was active in supporting the further construction of tunnels beneath Gaza, as well as the smuggling of weapons through these tunnels to the armed wings of Hamas and Palestinian Islamic Jihad. In 2021, prominent Hamas representative in Lebanon, Ahmad Abd al-Hadi, said:

The idea of [digging] tunnels... Today there are 360 kilometers of tunnels in Gaza. There are more than 360 kilometers of tunnels underground. I won't go into details on this. Two people came up with the idea of digging these tunnels: The first is the martyred commander Imad Mughniyeh, and the second is Hajj Qasem Soleimani who went to Gaza more than once and contributed to the defense plan from the moment it was first drafted. I am not divulging any secret, by the way. The enemies know all this but what the enemies do not know is way more than what they do know.

According to the American Enterprise Institute, Soleimani along with other Iranian officials worked with Hamas leaders against the Israeli Army during the 2008-2009 Gaza War.

In November 2023, Iranian Brigadier-General Abdolfattah Ahvazian, assistant to the Commander of the Quds Force, stated that Soleimani played a role in the creation and multiplication of the Gaza tunnel network:

After the martyrdom of Hajj Qasem [Soleimani], the guys from Hamas showed us a movie. I watched the movie, and according to the people of Hamas there, Hajj Qasem had gone into Gaza. He said to them: 'Why are you sitting idly by?' They answered: 'Hajj, there is no way.' So he gave the order to take a Jihadi action, and dig hundreds of tunnels, crossing the [Gaza] borders. Within three years, the Palestinians have dug hundreds of tunnels, approximately 800 km-long, with pickaxes and hoes. These are not the kind of tunnels that only mice can use. These tunnels allow the passages of cars, mules with ammunition, and motorcycles. 700 kilometers with nothing but pickaxes and hoes.

Shi'ite cleric Sheikh Jaffer Ladak asserted in January 2024 that Soleimani played a significant role in influencing Palestinian faction' strategy, shifting it away from the suicide bombing attacks widely used during the Second Intifada and toward an underground warfare strategy:

Ayman Zarqawi was the one who began the idea of suicide bombings and then, he used this influence upon the Palestinians who then felt it was needful to be able to do suicide bombings in the occupied territories. Suicide bombings, of course, not only has a great ishqal and problem with it, it is not with the flavor of Islamic resistance. It doesn't yield the goals, and also drew the ire of the world community on the Palestinian resistance. Enter people like martyr Qasem Soleimani. And, with his influence, you would actually see that the structure of the Palestinian resistance was overhauled. The tunnels that were being tug [sic], and its relationship with the rest of the Islamic world, particularly those in Lebanon, particularly those in Iran, flourished, to such an extent that now, the so-called strongest army in West Asia still cannot defeat those people who have been starved for more than three months.

=== Syrian Civil War ===
We're not like the Americans. We don't abandon our friends.

— Attributed to Soleimani by a former Iraqi leader, referring to Syria. Quoted by Dexter Filkins.

Map of Al-Qusayr and its environs. The Al-Qusayr offensive was reportedly orchestrated by Soleimani.

According to several sources, including Riad Hijab, a former Syrian premier who deserted in August 2012, Soleimani was one of the strongest supporters of the Syrian government of Bashar al-Assad in the Syrian Civil War. Soleimani was involved in planning and carrying out the Siege of Baba Amr during the Siege of Homs in 2011–2014, according to the then-Syrian Minister of Defense, Ali Abdullah Ayyoub. In the later half of 2012, Soleimani assumed personal control of the Iranian intervention in the Syrian Civil War, when the Iranians became deeply concerned about the Assad government's inability to fight the opposition, and the negative consequences to the Islamic Republic if the Syrian government fell. He reportedly coordinated the war from a base in Damascus at which a Lebanese Hezbollah commander and an Iraqi Shia militia coordinator were mobilized, in addition to Syrian and Iranian officers. Under Soleimani, the command "coordinated attacks, trained militias, and set up an elaborate system to monitor rebel communications". According to a Middle Eastern security official Dexter Filkins talked to, thousands of Quds Force and Iraqi Shia militiamen in Syria were "spread out across the entire country". The retaking of Qusayr in May 2013 from rebel forces and Al-Nusra Front was, according to John Maguire, a former CIA officer in Iraq, "orchestrated" by Soleimani.

Brigadier General Hossein Hamadani, the Basij's former deputy commander, helped to run irregular militias that Soleimani hoped would continue the fight if Assad fell. Soleimani helped establish the National Defence Forces (NDF) in 2013 which would formalize the coalition of pro-Assad groups.

Soleimani was much credited in Syria for the strategy that assisted President Bashar al-Assad in finally repulsing rebel forces and recapturing key cities and towns. He was involved in the training of government-allied militias and the coordination of decisive military offensives. The sighting of Iranian UAVs in Syria strongly suggested that his command, the Quds Force, was involved in the civil war.

In a visit to the Lebanese capital Beirut on 29 January 2015, Soleimani laid wreaths at the graves of the slain Hezbollah members, including Jihad Mughniyah, which strengthened suspicions about a collaboration between Hezbollah and the Quds Force.

=== Orchestration of military coalition in 2015 ===
In 2015, Soleimani began gathering support from various sources to combat the newly resurgent Islamic State of Iraq and the Levant (ISIL) and rebel groups which had both successfully taken large swaths of territory from Assad's forces. He was reportedly the main architect of the joint intervention involving Russia as a new partner with Assad and Hezbollah.

According to Reuters, at a meeting in Moscow in July, Soleimani unfurled a map of Syria to explain to his Russian hosts how a series of defeats for President Bashar al-Assad could be turned into victory—with Russia's help. Soleimani's visit to Moscow was the first step in planning for the Russian military intervention that has reshaped the Syrian war and forged a new Iran–Russia alliance in support of the Syrian (and Iraqi) governments. Iran's supreme leader, Ali Khamenei, also sent a senior envoy to Moscow to meet President Vladimir Putin. "Putin reportedly told [a senior Iranian envoy] 'Okay we will intervene. Send Qassem Soleimani.'" Soleimani went to explain the map of the theatre and coordinate the strategic escalation of military forces in Syria.

=== Operations in Aleppo ===
Map of the 2015 Aleppo offensives

Soleimani had a decisive impact on the theater of operations, which led to a strong advance in southern Aleppo with the government and allied forces re-capturing two military bases and dozens of towns and villages in a matter of weeks. There was also a series of major advances towards Kuweiris air-base to the north-east. By mid-November, the Syrian army and its allies had gained ground in southern areas of Aleppo Governorate, capturing numerous rebel strongholds. Soleimani was reported to have personally led the drive deep into the southern Aleppo countryside where many towns and villages fell into government hands. He reportedly commanded the Syrian Arab Army's 4th Mechanized Division, Hezbollah, Harakat Al-Nujaba (Iraqi), Kata'ib Hezbollah (Iraqi), Liwaa Abu Fadl Al-Abbas (Iraqi), and Firqa Fatayyemoun (Afghan/Iranian volunteers).

In early February 2016, backed by Russian and Syrian air force airstrikes, the 4th Mechanized Division—in close coordination with Hezbollah, the National Defense Forces (NDF), Kata'eb Hezbollah, and Harakat Al-Nujaba—launched an offensive in Aleppo Governorate's northern countryside, which eventually broke the three-year siege of Nubl and Al-Zahraa and cut off the rebels' main supply route from Turkey. According to a senior, non-Syrian security source close to Damascus, Iranian fighters played a crucial role in the conflict. "Qassem Soleimani is there in the same area", he said. In December 2016, new photos emerged of Soleimani at the Citadel of Aleppo, though the exact date of the photos is unknown.

In late March 2017, Soleimani was seen in the northern Hama Governorate countryside in Syria, reportedly aiding Major General Suheil al-Hassan to repel a major rebel offensive.

=== War against ISIL ===
A map of Saladin Governorate in Iraq. Soleimani was involved in breaking the Siege of Amirli by ISIL in the eastern part of the governorate.

During the war against the Islamic State, the US military and Iranian proxy forces led by Qasem Soleimani effectively conducted their offensives in unison. He had a significant role in Iran's fight against ISIL in Iraq. He was described as the "linchpin" bringing together Kurdish and Shia forces to fight ISIS, overseeing joint operations conducted by the two groups.

In 2014, Soleimani was in the Iraqi city of Amirli, to work with Iraqi forces to push back ISIL militants. The Los Angeles Times reported that Amirli was the first town to successfully withstand an ISIL invasion, and was secured thanks to "an unusual partnership of Iraqi and Kurdish soldiers, Iranian-backed Shia militias and U.S. warplanes".

A senior Iraqi official told the BBC that when the city of Mosul fell, the rapid reaction of Iran, rather than American bombing, was what prevented a more widespread collapse. Soleimani also seems to have been instrumental in planning the operation to relieve Amirli in Saladin Governorate, where ISIL had laid siege to an important city. In fact, the Quds force operatives under Soleimani's command seem to have been deeply involved not only with the Iraqi army and Shia militias but also with the Kurdish forces in the Battle of Amirli, providing liaisons for intelligence-sharing along with arms, munitions and expertise.

In the operation to liberate Jurf Al Sakhar, he was reportedly "present on the battlefield". Some Shia militia commanders described Soleimani as "fearless", one pointing out that the Iranian general never wears a flak jacket even on the front lines.

In November 2014, Shia and Kurdish forces under Soleimani's command pushed ISIL out of the Iraqi villages of Jalawla and Saadia in the Diyala Governorate.

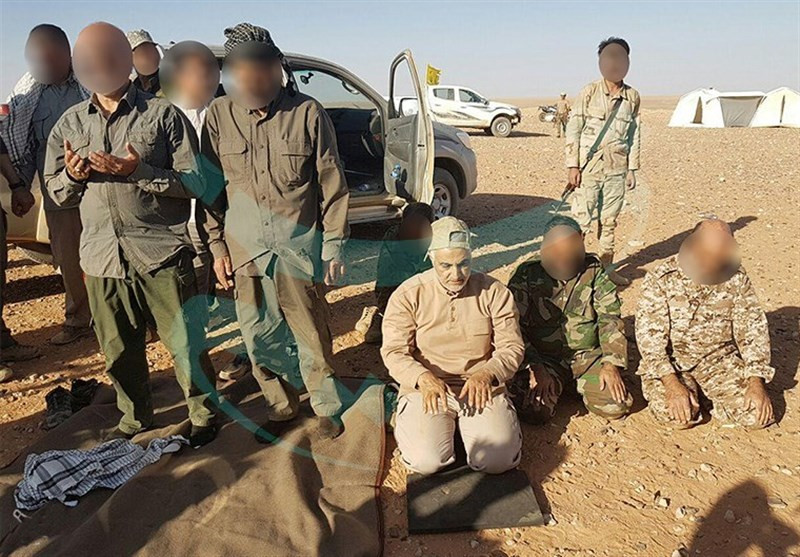
Soleimani praying in the Syrian Desert in 2017

Soleimani played an integral role in the organization and planning of the crucial operation to retaking the city of Tikrit in Iraq from ISIL. The city of Tikrit rests on the left bank of the Tigris river and is the largest and most important city between Baghdad and Mosul, giving it a high strategic value. The city fell to ISIL during 2014 when ISIL made immense gains in northern and central Iraq. After its capture, ISIL's massacre at Camp Speicher led to 1,600 to 1,700 deaths of Iraqi Army cadets and soldiers. After months of careful preparation and intelligence gathering an offensive to encircle and capture Tikrit was launched in early March 2015.

In 2016, photos published by a Popular Mobilization Forces (PMF) source showed Soleimani attending a meeting of PMF commanders in Iraq to discuss the Battle of Fallujah.

CIA chief Mike Pompeo said he sent Soleimani and other Iranian leaders a letter holding them responsible for any attacks on U.S. interests by forces under their control. According to Mohammad Mohammadi Golpayegani, a senior aide for Iran's supreme leader, Soleimani ignored the letter when it was handed over to him during the Abu Kamal offensive against ISIL, saying "I will not take your letter nor read it and I have nothing to say to these people."

== Political activities ==
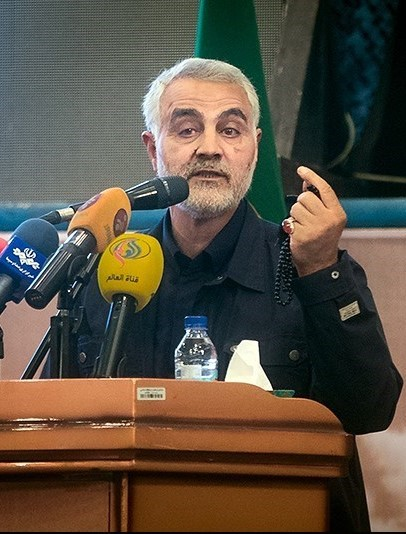
Soleimani speaking at International Day of Mosque conference

In 1999, Soleimani, along with other senior IRGC commanders, signed a letter to then-President Mohammad Khatami regarding the student protests in July. They wrote "Dear Mr. Khatami, how long do we have to shed tears, sorrow over the events, practice democracy by chaos and insults, and have revolutionary patience at the expense of sabotaging the system? Dear president, if you don't make a revolutionary decision and act according to your Islamic and national missions, tomorrow will be so late and irrecoverable that cannot be even imagined."

Iranian media reported in 2012 that he might be replaced as the commander of Quds Force in order to allow him to run in the 2013 presidential election. He reportedly refused to be nominated for the election. According to BBC News, in 2015 a campaign started among conservative bloggers for Soleimani to stand for 2017 presidential election. In 2016, he was speculated as a possible candidate, however in a statement published on 15 September 2016, he called speculations about his candidacy as "divisive reports by the enemies" and said he will "always remain a simple soldier serving Iran and the Islamic Revolution".

In the summer of 2018, Soleimani and Tehran exchanged public remarks with American President Donald Trump related to Red Sea shipping which heightened tensions between the two countries and their allies in the region.

Masoud Barzani, who is the leader of the Kurdistan Democratic Party in Iraq, claimed Soleimani supported the US invasion of Iraq as a "great victory" for Iran.

== Sanctions ==
In March 2007, Soleimani was included on a list of Iranian individuals targeted with sanctions in United Nations Security Council Resolution 1747. On 18 May 2011, he was sanctioned again by the U.S. along with Syrian president Bashar al-Assad and other senior Syrian officials due to his alleged involvement in providing material support to the Syrian government.

In 2007, the U.S. included him in a "Designation of Iranian Entities and Individuals for Proliferation Activities and Support for Terrorism", which forbade U.S. citizens from doing business with him. The list, published in the EU's Official Journal on 24 June 2011, also included a Syrian property firm, an investment fund and two other enterprises accused of funding the Syrian government. The list also included Mohammad Ali Jafari and Hossein Taeb.

On 24 June 2011, the Official Journal of the European Union said the three Iranian Revolutionary Guard members now subject to sanctions had been "providing equipment and support to help the Syrian government suppress protests in Syria". The Iranians added to the EU sanctions list were two Revolutionary Guard commanders, Soleimani, Mohammad Ali Jafari, and the Guard's deputy commander for intelligence, Hossein Taeb. Soleimani was also sanctioned by the Swiss government in September 2011 on the same grounds cited by the European Union.

On 13 November 2018, the U.S. sanctioned an Iraqi military leader named Shibl Muhsin 'Ubayd Al-Zaydi and others who allegedly were acting on Soleimani's behalf in financing military actions in Syria or otherwise providing support for terrorism in the region.

== Public image ==
July 2018 speech addressing U.S. President Trump

The U.S. President tweeted some ridiculous things in response to our president's statements. It is beneath the dignity of the president of the great Islamic country of Iran to respond, so I will respond, as a soldier of our nation. You are threatening us by taking an action that has no precedent in the world. First of all, despite the fact that one year and a half has passed since this person became president of the United States, Trump's rhetoric is still the same as that of a gambling den. It is cabaret rhetoric with a twist. When he talks to China, when he talks to Russia, when he talks to Europe, when he talks to the world, one feels like a gambler is talking. Let me tell you, Mr. Trump, you gambler. Know that we are near you where you least expect it. Where you could not even imagine. We are a nation of martyrdom. We are the nation of Imam Hussein. Ask around. We have endured many hardships. Come, we are waiting. We are the real men on the field, as far as you are concerned. For you, we know that this war means destruction. You may start the war, but we will draw its end. So, you should not insult the Iranian nation. You should not insult our president.

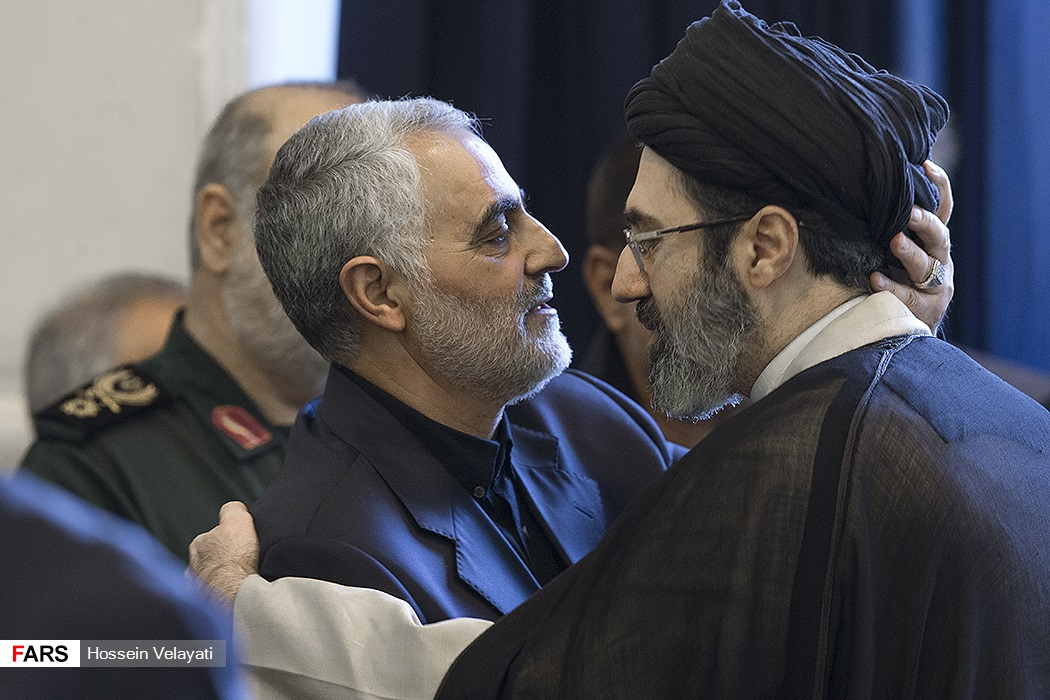
Soleimani (left) with future supreme leader Mojtaba Khamenei at Soleimani's father's funeral ceremony in 2017

=== Public image in Iran ===
According to the former U.S. Department of State official Ryan Crocker, Soleimani was referred to as Haji Qassem by Iranian officials. A poll conducted in collaboration with IranPoll for the University of Maryland School of Public Policy indicated that by October 2019, Soleimani was viewed favorably by 82% of Iranians with 59% of Iranians viewing him very favorably. He was often considered the second most powerful leader in Iran, behind Ayatollah Khamenei. Since the Iran–Iraq War (1980–88), in which Iran was attacked by Saddam Hussein's Iraq and also felt attacked by other countries which sided with Iraq, including the U.S., which supplied weapons and intelligence to Iraq, Soleimani had developed into an architect of Iran's foreign policies in the Middle East and a key figure behind Iran's foreign and defence policies. According to "social media users" and other sources a prominent chef and influencer named Navab Ebrahimi was arrested for posting a recipe to make Persian cutlets on the third anniversary of the death of Soleimani. Iranian opponents began to refer to him as "Kotelt" (a Persian term for "cutlet"), supposedly drawing a connection between his slain body following the effect of the airstrike and the minced meat used in making cutlets.

=== Public image outside of Iran ===
The commander of the Iraqi shia militia Asa'ib Ahl al-Haq, Qais Khazali, told Frontline in 2017 that "Qassem Soleimani has a great personality, he is humble, he has great political intelligence." Miriam Berger of The Washington Post' wrote that Soleimani was "both revered and reviled". Israeli journalist Amotz Asa-El of The Jerusalem Post referred to Soleimani as "a warrior". General David Petraeus described Soleimani as "a very, very capable" adversary.

=== Iranian propaganda ===
Soleimani cultivated public relations and a personality cult that formed part of his image.

After Soleimani's death, the Iranian propaganda campaign intensified efforts in coordinating positive international public opinion toward him. These efforts included using state-run TV channels and several social media accounts, a large proportion of which had newly been created, and posting images such as heroic, "noble warrior" depictions of Soleimani, appealing to both nationalists and religious conservatives. It is believed by many that these measures have been at least partially successful, arguing that even some American outlets were biased.

== Assassination ==
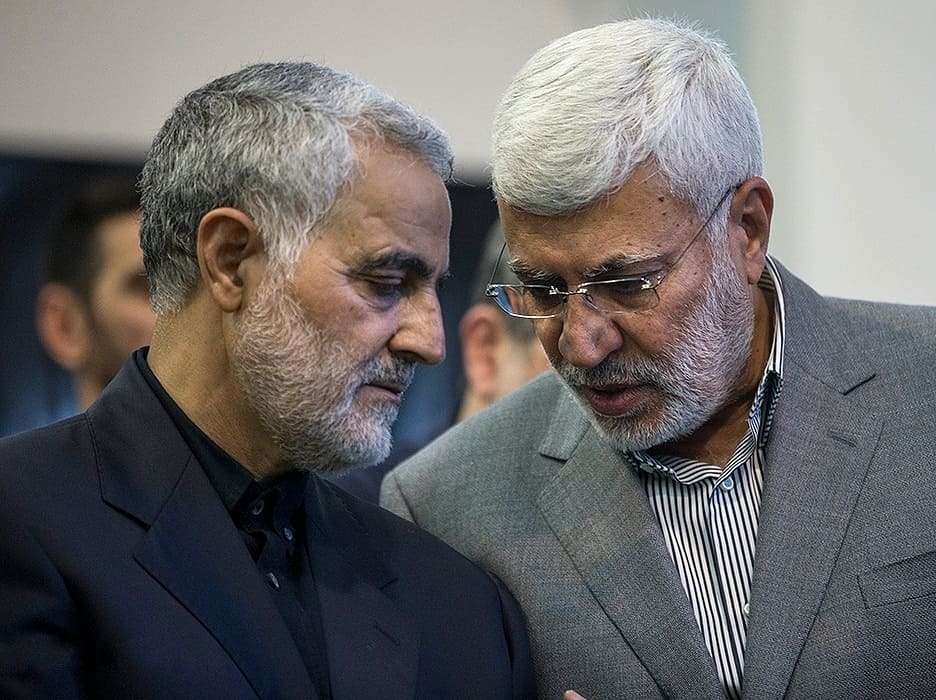
Qasem Soleimani (left) with Abu Mahdi al-Muhandis at a 2017 ceremony commemorating the father of Soleimani, in Mosalla, Tehran

Soleimani was assassinated on 3 January 2020 around 1:00 a.m. local time (22:00 UTC 2 January), by a U.S. drone strike near Baghdad International Airport. BBC News, NBC News, DW News, Time, The Guardian and other media outlets have said Soleimani was assassinated or described the killing as an assassination. Senior officials of the U.S. Department of State compared it to Operation Vengeance in World War II, when American pilots shot down the plane carrying Japanese Admiral Isoroku Yamamoto – a comparison concurred with by The New York Times and other prominent media and pundits.

Soleimani was on his way to meet Iraqi Prime Minister Adil Abdul-Mahdi and had just left his plane, which arrived in Iraq from Lebanon or Syria. Adil Abdul Mahdi said Soleimani was bringing Iran's response to a letter that Iraq had sent out on behalf of Saudi Arabia in order to ease tensions between the two countries in the region. The prime minister did not reveal the message's exact content. Also killed were four members of the Popular Mobilization Forces (PMF), including Abu Mahdi al-Muhandis, the Iraqi military commander, former head of the PMF. Soleimani's body was identified using a ring he wore on his finger.

Soleimani was posthumously promoted to the rank of Lieutenant General and praised as a martyr by speaker of the Iranian parliament Ali Larijani and Mohsen Rezaei, a former commander of the IRGC. Soleimani was succeeded by Esmail Qaani as commander of the Quds Force.

According to the Iranian Students News Agency quoting the Iraqi Al-Ahd network, there are diverse narratives concerning the drones which killed Soleimani and Abu-Mahdi al-Muhandis). One mentions American drones taking off from Kuwait and entering Iraq, which the headquarters of the Kuwaiti Armed Forces denied after a few hours. The other is that an American UAV took off from the Al Udeid Air Base in Qatar. Also, according to Ahmed al-Asadi, a member of the Iraqi Parliament: "The drones which carried out the assassination operation, were three American UAVs that took-off from the military-base of Ain al-Assad and flew in the sky of Baghdad for 20 hours on Thursday morning and then came back directly to the "Ain al-Assad" base after carrying out the assassination operation." According to Radio-Farda quoting American media, the drones were the MQ-9 Reaper.

=== U.S. decision-making ===
CNBC reported that the U.S. had been in pursuit of Soleimani for decades. President Trump had expressed a desire to target Soleimani in a 2017 meeting with then National Security Adviser H. R. McMaster. On 13 January 2020, five senior current and former Trump administration officials told NBC News that Trump had authorized the killing of Soleimani in June 2019 on the basis that he had been involved in the killing of many Americans, a decision backed by U.S. Secretary of State Mike Pompeo. In making the 2020 strike, the Pentagon focused on Soleimani's past actions and on deterring future such actions. The strike followed attacks on the American embassy in Baghdad by supporters of an Iran-backed Iraqi Shia militia and the 2019 K-1 Air Base attack. Anonymous officials told The New York Times that Trump had initially decided to strike at the Shia militia, but instead chose the most extreme option proposed (killing Soleimani) after seeing television footage of the attack on the embassy. The death of an Iraqi-American contractor in a rocket attack in December 2019 was reportedly also used as justification for the strike, contradicting the Trump administration's claim that Soleimani was targeted because he was plotting "imminent" attacks on Americans and had to be targeted in order to stop these attacks.

The U.S. Defense Department said the strike was carried out "at the direction of the President" and asserted that Soleimani had been planning further attacks on American diplomats and military personnel and had approved the attacks on the American embassy in Baghdad in response to U.S. airstrikes in Iraq and Syria on 29 December 2019, and that the strike was meant to deter future attacks. As part of the administration's changing justification for the strike, a national security adviser asserted that Soleimani had intended further attacks on American diplomats and troops, and Defense Secretary Mark Esper asserted the general had been expected to mastermind an attack within days. President Trump stated in a Fox News interview that four embassies, including the U.S. embassy in Baghdad, had been targeted; Secretary of State Mike Pompeo said it was not known where or when the attacks would have taken place.

=== Legal status of the assassination ===
In June 2020, Iran placed an arrest warrant for U.S. president Donald Trump, with an Iranian prosecutor saying Trump and 35 others "faced murder and terrorism charges" over the killing of Soleimani.

The strike was not approved by the U.S. Congress or consented to by the Iraqi government, leading to controversy regarding the legality of killing an Iranian military leader in Iraqi airspace.

An arrest warrant was issued by an Iraqi court for President Donald Trump in connection with the killing of Soleimani. The arrest warrant was for a charge of premeditated murder, which carries the death penalty on conviction.

==== Under U.S. law ====
On 14 February 2020, in a legally required unclassified memorandum to Congress, the Trump administration said it was authorized under both the Constitution and the 2002 Authorization of Use of Military Force Against Iraq.

However, the Chairman of the House Committee on Foreign Affairs, Eliot Engel, said "The 2002 authorization was passed to deal with Saddam Hussein. This law had nothing to do with Iran or Iranian government officials in Iraq. To suggest that 18 years later this authorization could justify killing an Iranian official stretches the law far beyond anything Congress ever intended," adding that he "looked forward" to Pompeo testifying in a 28 February hearing.

==== Under international law ====
The United States, as a member of the United Nations, has ratified the Charter of the United Nations and, therefore, is bound by its provisions. Agnès Callamard, United Nations Special Rapporteur on extrajudicial, summary or arbitrary executions, and Director of Columbia University's Global Freedom of Expression project, researched the alleged legal basis for the killing of Soleimani advanced by the United States government and stated that Soleimani's killing could have been justified under international law only if it had been a response to an "imminent threat." However, she said that the United States had provided no evidence to support that contention. "Absent an actual imminent threat to life, the course of action taken by the U.S. was unlawful," Callamard wrote in a report that she presented in July 2020 to the U.N. Human Rights Council in Geneva. The Trump administration's February 2020 memorandum to Congress was "remarkably vague and inconsequential as far as a possible imminent threat is concerned," Ms. Callamard wrote in the report. "Even at the most basic level, the U.S. did not demonstrate that striking Suleimani was 'necessary.'"

Callamard also concluded that the killing sets an alarming precedent—it was the first targeted drone killing of a senior foreign government official on the territory of a third country. The world now faced "the very real prospect that states may opt to 'strategically' eliminate high-ranking military officials outside the context of a 'known' war, and seek to justify the killing on the grounds of the target's classification as a 'terrorist' who posed a potential future threat," Callamard said in her report. Also, she noted that scores of countries and many non-state actors now have operational drones, and that drones kill many non-combatants for every person targeted.

=== Reaction ===
According to Agnès Callamard, the UN special rapporteur on extrajudicial killing, "the killings of Qassem Suleimani and Abu Mahdi al-Muhandis violates international human rights law". She said the U.S. is required to confirm "the individual targeted constituted an imminent threat to others." Callamard also described the killing of other individuals alongside Soleimani as "unlawful" and other scholars argue it violates international law. Russian Foreign Minister Sergei Lavrov, Medea Benjamin (the founder of anti-war advocacy group Code Pink) and Hillary Mann Leverett (a political risk consultant and former director of Iran affairs at the White House's National Security Council) called the assassination of Soleimani "flatly illegal".

Analysts Ali Vaez and Iain King and some Twitter users compared the event to the assassination of Archduke Franz Ferdinand, and #Ferdinand and #WWIII began trending on Twitter because of what BBC News called "obvious parallels [...] a single strike bringing existing tensions to boiling point". Some protesters raised concerns that Iraq could become a site of open clashes between Iran and the U.S. following the assassination of Soleimani in Baghdad and Iran's retaliatory missile attacks on U.S. bases.

Democrats, including top 2020 presidential candidates, condemned the killing of Soleimani, arguing that it escalated the conflict with Iran, and risked retaliation or war.

According to Jeremy Bowen of the BBC, the Islamic State of Iraq and the Levant (ISIL) praised the killing of Soleimani as a divine intervention, saying it helped jihadists.

UK Foreign Secretary Dominic Raab described the American action as "self-defence".

According to a Meta (then Facebook) spokesperson, Instagram and its parent company Meta (then Facebook) are removing posts "that voice support for slain Iranian commander Qassem Soleimani to comply with U.S. sanctions."

Some activists living out of reach of the Iranian authorities, such as Saghar Erica Kasraie, Reza Alijani, and Masih Alinejad, condemned Soleimani. Some Iranians mourning for the dead of Ukraine International Airlines Flight 752 less than a week after his death called him a murderer and tore up his pictures during the protests. BBC reported that "the protests were, however, far smaller than the mass demonstrations across Iran in support of Soleimani".

Ismail Haniyeh described Soleimani as "the martyr of Jerusalem" in a speech pronounced in Tehran during his funeral. Hassan Nasrallah after the assassination claimed "Trump is the U.S. president who makes up the most lies, they are all liars, but he is the worst. 'Haj Qasem Soleimani' was never planning to attack U.S. embassies! Trump just wanted to make up an excuse for his crime."

Iran's Foreign Minister Javad Zarif said in a leaked tape that "Soleimani's death caused more damage to the country than if the U.S. wiped out an entire city."

=== Funeral and burial ===
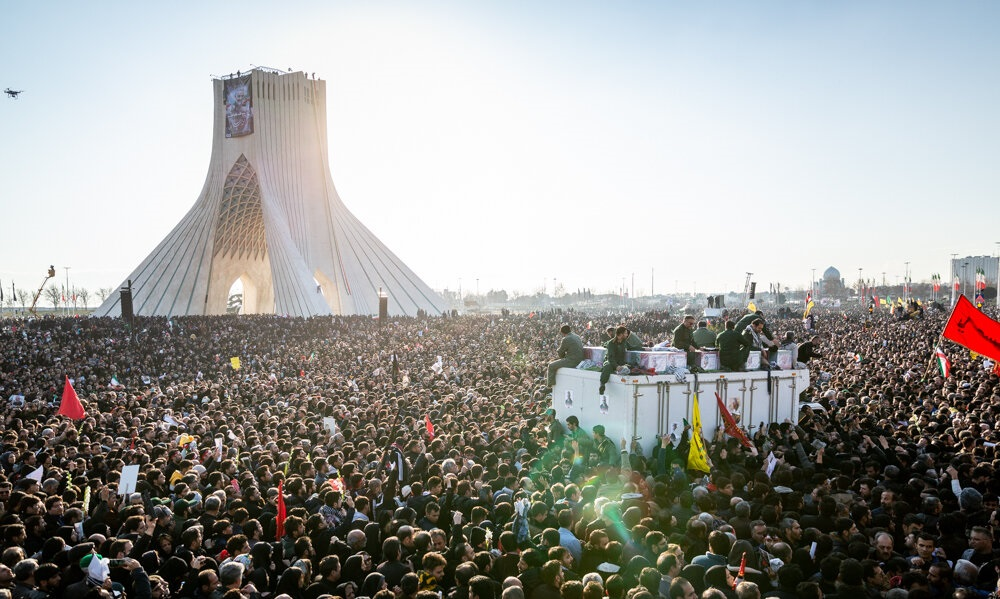
Mourners at Azadi Square, Tehran

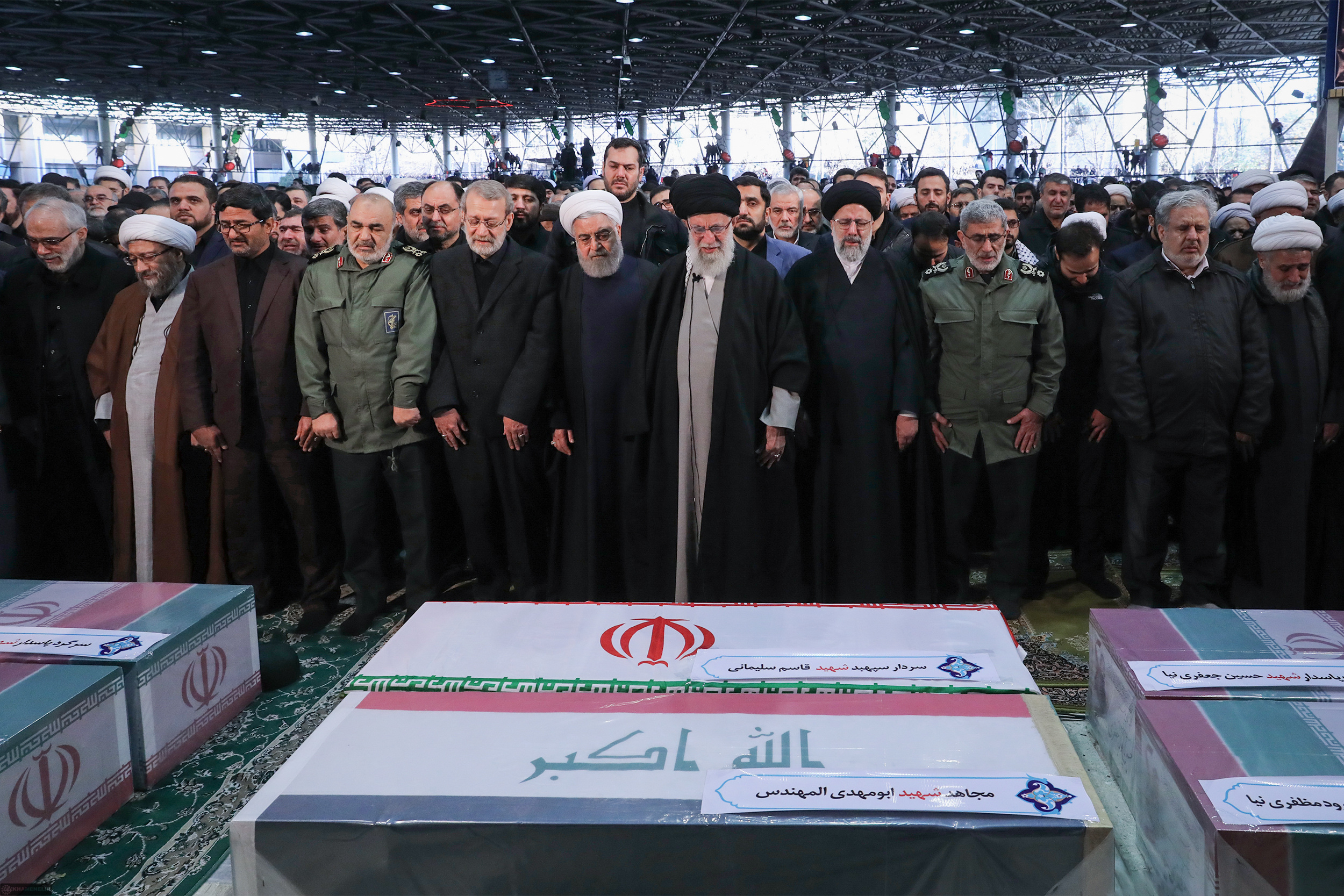
Ali Khamenei leading Salat al-Janazah, the Islamic funeral prayer. Others pictured include Hassan Rouhani, Ebrahim Raisi, Ali Larijani, Hossein Salami, Esmail Qaani and Ismail Haniyeh.

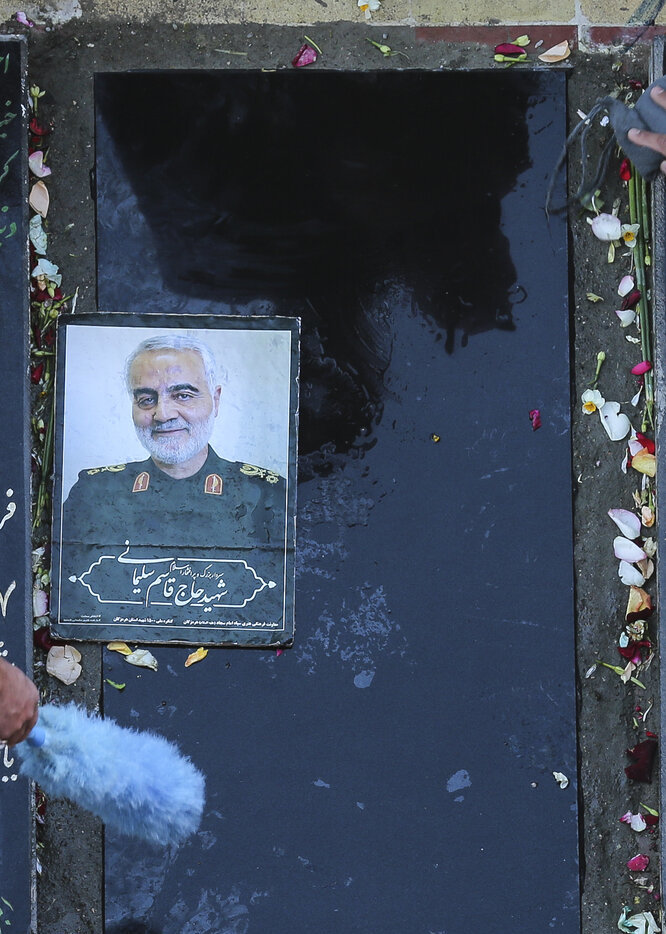
Soleimani's grave. He had asked for a simple gravestone "similar to [his] shahid comrades" and without any honorific title inscribed along his name.

On 4 January, a funeral procession for Soleimani was held in Baghdad with thousands of mourners in attendance, waving Iraqi and militia flags and chanting "death to America, death to Israel". The procession started at the Al-Kadhimiya Mosque in Baghdad. Iraq's prime minister, Adil Abdul-Mahdi, and leaders of Iran-backed militias attended the funeral procession. Soleimani's remains were taken to the holy Shia cities of Karbala and Najaf. On 5 January, the remains of the bodies arrived in Ahvaz, and then Mashhad. Tens of thousands of mourners in black clothes attended the funeral procession with green, white, and red flags. Muqtada al-Sadr paid a visit to Soleimani's house to express his condolence to his family.

On 6 January, the body of Soleimani and other casualties arrived at the Iranian capital Tehran. Huge crowds, with the Times of Israel estimating "more than 10 million" (the largest funeral procession since Ayatollah Khomeini's), packed the streets. Supreme Leader Ali Khamenei, who had a close relationship with Soleimani, led the traditional Islamic prayer for the dead, weeping at one point in front of the flag-draped coffins. Zeinab Soleimani, a daughter of Soleimani, spoke at the event and warned her father's demise "will bring darker days" for the U.S. and Israel. Esmail Qaani, who was named commander of the Quds Force hours after Soleimani's killing, said: "God the Almighty has promised to get his revenge, and God is the main avenger." Iranian foreign minister Mohammad Javad Zarif asked if Trump had ever seen "such a sea of humanity". He was given a multi-city funeral, and his funeral procession was said to be the second largest after that of Ayatollah Khomeini.

On 7 January 2020, a stampede took place at the burial procession for Soleimani in Kerman attended by hundreds of thousands of mourners, killing 56 and injuring 212 more.

=== Retaliation ===
On 7 January 2020, the Supreme National Security Council of Iran announced that it had drafted a 13 revenge scenarios document.

The next day, the Iranian military responded to Soleimani's death by launching ballistic missiles at two U.S. bases in Iraq, resulting in no reported casualties but 110 traumatic brain injuries. Iranian officials and some Western media analysts suggested the strike was deliberately designed to avoid causing any casualties to avoid an American response. The Iranian president cautioned the U.S. that Iran will take more retaliatory actions if the U.S. continues to interfere in the region. After the missile attack on Ayn al-Asad airbase, Ukraine International Airlines Flight 752 was shot down by the Islamic Revolutionary Guard Corps (IRGC) shortly after it had taken off. While initial reports suggested that the missile strike was a result of a mistake, subsequent evidence raised the possibility that the flight might have been intentionally targeted. Some interpretations of the evidence indicated that this action could have been taken to divert public attention towards the US intervention in the region and to prevent potential retaliatory actions from the United States.

=== Execution of spy ===
On 20 July 2020, it was reported by Iranian state television that a man named Mahmoud Mousavi Majd had been executed following his conviction for providing information to the United States and Israel about Soleimani and the Quds Force.

=== Anniversary ===
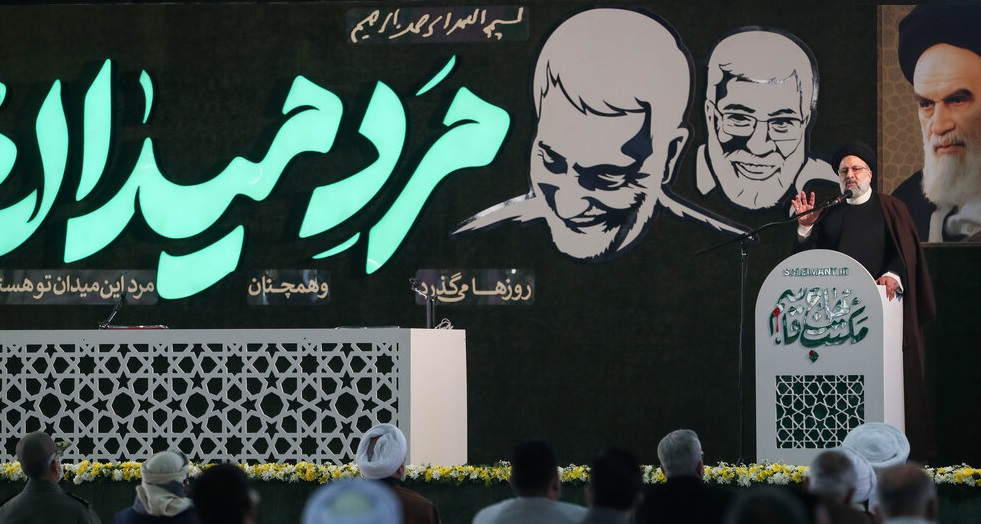
Commemoration ceremony (anniversary) of "Qasem-Soleimani", in Tehran

Following Soleimani's death, the Islamic Republic had embedded him within their martyrdom culture, where he was idolized through public images like billboards, monuments, and murals.

On 3 January 2021, the first anniversary was marked of Qassem Soleimani and Abu Mahdi al-Muhandis in Baghdad. Tens of thousands of mourners marched on the highway to the Baghdad International Airport, the location of Soleimani's death, where they held a candlelight vigil. Maher Nazeh of Reuters reported that "tens of thousands of supporters of Iranian-backed Iraqi paramilitary groups" chanted anti-American slogans on the anniversary.

There have been held commemoration ceremonies by the name of "Commemoration-Ceremony (Anniversary) of Martyr Qassem-Soleimani" (and Abu Mahdi al-Muhandis) in presence and virtually (via web conferencing) in the cities of the Islamic Republic of Iran and several countries, such as Oman, Iraq, Syria and Portugal.

According to Fars News Agency, the anniversary of the commemoration of Qasem Soleimani, Abu Mahdi al-Muhandis and their colleagues was held with the presence of local and foreign officials in University of Tehran, Iran.

On 3 January 2024, an explosion occurred near a cemetery in Kerman, on the 4th anniversary of Soleimani's death. About 89 people were killed and another 284 wounded, in an attack claimed by the ISIS.

On 3 January 2025, the Iranian government held a rally to mark the fifth anniversary of the death of "national hero" Qasem Soleimani, whom Iran claimed played a key role in "defeating terrorism" abroad. His popularity in Iran has significantly increased following the fall of the Assad regime in Syria, and the perceived inability of his successor, Esmail Qaani, to maintain the same level of effectiveness.

== Cultural depictions and legacy ==
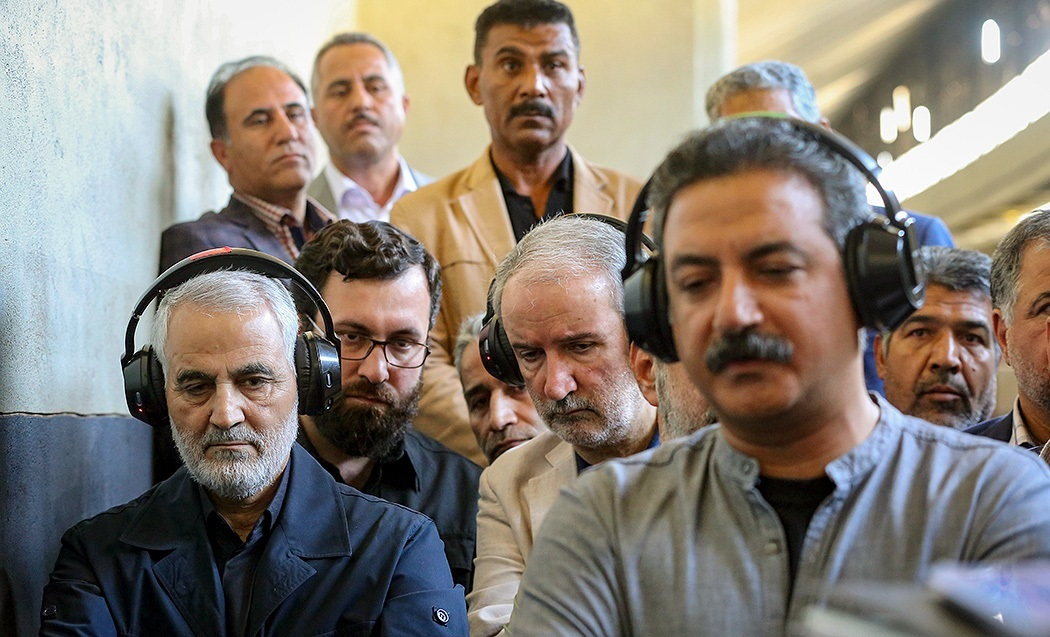
Soleimani behind the scenes of the film 23 People

In 2015, the British magazine The Week featured a cartoon of Soleimani in bed with Uncle Sam, alluding to both sides effectively conducting their offensives in unison during the War against the Islamic State.

The 2016 film Bodyguard, directed by Ebrahim Hatamikia, was inspired by Soleimani's activities.

The 2016 Persian book Noble Comrades 17: Hajj Qassem, written by Ali Akbari Mozdabadi, contains memoirs of Qassem Soleimani. In 2017, a computer-animated film, Battle of Persian Gulf II, where Soleimani is portrayed as the hero of the film.

Resalat Expressway in Tehran was renamed "Shahid Sardar Qasem Soleimani" in his honor.

Shortly after his death, various representations of Qasem Soleimani appeared in many wall paintings and propaganda posters in Iran. Since then, his portrait has become more and more an integral part of the iconographic representation of the Islamic Republic.

On 13 January 2020, Syrian Minister of Defense Ali Abdullah Ayyoub presented the medal of "The Champion of the Syrian Arab Republic", which President Bashar al-Assad granted posthumously to Qassem Soleimani, to his Iranian counterpart, Amir Hatami.

In August 2020, Iran unveiled a new ballistic missile named Martyr Haj Qasem and a new cruise missile named Martyr Abu Mahdi after Abu Mahdi al-Muhandis, the Iraqi commander killed alongside Soleimani.

"Shahid Soleimani Plan" (also "Martyr Soleimani Project") is the name of a complementary project to fight SARS-CoV-2 during the COVID-19 pandemic in Iran, in which more than 17 million households were screened, and this screening has been performed by more than 4.5 million "health ambassadors" in Iran.

During Mahsa Protests, his pictures, banners featuring him, and also his statues were targeted, burned and crushed by angry protesters as his involvement in the crackdown and killing of protesters in the past decade and other war crimes came to light.

On 2 October 2023, the AFC called off a match between Iranian side Sepahan and Saudi side Al-Ittihad in Isfahan after Al-Ittihad refused to take the pitch when their requests for a bust of Soleimani to be removed were refused.

A statue of Soleimani was built in the "Garden of Iran" on the outskirts of the Maroun al-Ras in southern Lebanon but the garden was demolished by the Israeli forces in October 2024 during the Hezbollah–Israel conflict.

On 2 April 2026, US President Donald Trump called Soleimani as an "evil genius" and a "brilliant person" but a "horrible human being," and said that if he had been alive during the 2026 Iran war Iran may have been in a much better, stronger position.

== Honors and decorations ==
=== Military decorations ===

Order of Zolfaghar	Order of Fath (1st class)	Order of Fath (2nd class)	Order of Fath (2nd class)

=== Foreign honors ===
- Ba'athist Syria:
  - The Medal of the Champion of the Syrian Arab Republic (2020; posthumously)

== Published works ==
- I Feared Nothing: The Autobiography of Qasem Soleimani, 1957–1979, Lantern Publications, 2023.

== See also ==
- Haj Qasem (missile)
- Qassem Bassir
- List of assassinations by the United States
- List of Iranian two-star generals since 1979
- Iranian leaders of the Iran–Iraq War
- List of commanders of the Islamic Revolutionary Guard Corps
- Mohsen Hojaji
- Mohammad Reza Fallahzadeh

== Bibliography ==
- Azizi, Arash (2020). The Shadow Commander: Soleimani, the US, and Iran's Global Ambitions. Oneworld Publications. ISBN 978-1-78607-945-9.

Military offices
New title	Commander of the 41st Tharallah Division; 1982–1998	Succeeded by Abdolmohammad Raufinejad
Preceded by ?	Commander of Quds Headquarters; 1997–?	Succeeded by ?
Preceded by Ahmad Vahidi	Commander of Quds Force; 21 March 1998–3 January 2020	Succeeded by Esmail Qaani
