= Aleppo offensive (October–December 2015) =

Operation that started on 16 October 2015

- Part of the Battle of Aleppo, Syrian Civil War and the Russian military intervention in the Syrian Civil War
- Map of the frontline changes in the Aleppo Province from 16 October 2015 – 4 February 2016 Syrian Army control Syrian Opposition control SDF control Islamic State of Iraq and the Levant control Ongoing confrontation or unclear situation
Date	16 October – 21 December 2015 (2 months and 5 days)
Location	Aleppo Governorate, Syria
Status	Syrian government victory
Territorial changes	Government forces capture 408 square kilometres (158 square miles) of territory, including the area's main rebel strongholds of Al-Hader and Khan Tuman, cutting the Aleppo–Damascus highway and leaving them in control of three-quarters of the southern Aleppo countryside; Government forces regain control of the strategic Khanasser–Ithriya Highway from ISIL; The rebels capture nine villages

Belligerents
(Syria) Syrian Arab Republic; Iran; Iranian-backed Shi'ite Militias; Kata'ib Hezbollah; Harakat al-Nujaba; Liwa Abu al-Fadhal al-Abbas; Liwa Fatemiyoun; Al-Badr Brigades; Ammar Brigade; LAAG; Hezbollah Air strikes: Russia	Free Syrian Army; Islamic Front; Al-Nusra Front; Harakat Nour al-Din al-Zenki (until late Jan. 2016)	Islamic State (since 23 Oct.)

Commanders and leaders
(Iran) Maj. Gen. Qasem Soleimani (Supreme commander) (Ba'athist Syria) Maj. Gen. Saleh al-Abdullah (Syrian forces commander) (Iran) Col. Saeed Sayyah Taheri † (IRGC commander) (Iran) Mostafa Sadrzadeh † (Ammar Brigade leader); Hussein Ferdai † (senior commander of Liwa Fatemiyoun); Muhammad al-Sa’id (Liwa Al-Quds leader) (Russia) Aleksandr Dvornikov (Commander of Russian Forces) (Russia) Viktor Bondarev (Commander of Russian Aerospace Forces)	Hassan al-Haj Ali (Suqour al-Sham Brigade leader); Moder Abdul Salam Hamdoun †(Thuwar al-Sham Brigades senior commander); Issa al-Turkmani (Sultan Murad Brigade commander); Ismail Sanif † (Harakat Nour al-Din al-Zenki Commander); Bashar Mqaddam † (Kata’eb Thuwar al-Sham commander); Abdullah Al Ramla † (Levant Front); Hassan Maakh † (Harakat Nour al-Din al-Zenki field commander); Uwais al-Daghestani †(Caucasus Emirate field commander); Abu Suleiman al-Masri † (Al-Nusra Front senior commander); Faysal Shareef "Abu 'Ameer" † (Al-Nusra Front field commander); Abu Muthana Al-Midani † (Al-Nusra Front field commander); Mohammad Hamdoush †(Moroccan Brigades Commander)	(Islamic State) Abu Bakr al-Baghdadi (Islamic State) Abu Nurlbagasi † (Islamic State) Muhammad ibn Khayrat † (Islamic State) Al-Okab †

Units involved
Syrian Armed Forces; Syrian Army; 4th Mechanized Division; 46th Brigade; 82nd Brigade; 155th Brigade; 43rd Brigade; 10th Armoured Division; 66th Brigade; National Defence Forces; Local Defense Forces; Baqir Brigade; Ba'ath Brigades; Al-Quds Brigade; (Iran) IRGC; Quds Force; IRGC Ground Forces; Russian Armed Forces; Aerospace Forces; Spetsnaz GRU advisors	Free Syrian Army: Kata’eb Thuwar al-Sham; Division 13; Sultan Murad Division; Alwiya al-Furqan; Army of Mujahedeen; Islamic Front: Ahrar ash-Sham; Suqour al-Sham Brigade	(Islamic State) Military of ISIL

Strength
4,000+ Shi'ite militiamen and soldiers: 2,000 Iranian-backed fighters; 1,500 Iraqi paramilitary fighters	Unknown	Unknown

The Aleppo offensive (October–December 2015) was a Syrian Army large-scale strategic offensive south of Aleppo. The main objective of the operation was to secure the Azzan Mountains, while also creating a larger buffer zone around the only highway to the provincial capital controlled by the Syrian government. A related objective was to establish favourable conditions for a planned offensive to isolate rebel forces in Aleppo City and to relieve the long-standing siege of a pro-government enclave in Aleppo Governorate.

Iranian General Qasem Soleimani personally led the drive deep into the southern Aleppo countryside where many towns and villages were taken by government forces. The offensive was carried out by the Syrian Army's 4th Mechanized Division, Hezbollah, Harakat Al-Nujaba (Iraqi), Kata'ib Hezbollah (Iraqi), Liwaa Abu Fadl Al-Abbas (Iraqi), and Liwa Fatemiyoun (Afghan/Iranian volunteers). The Syrian government forces' progress was attributed in large part to the Iranian leadership during the offensive.

== Preparations ==
The origins of the planning of the offensive in Aleppo could be traced back to Gen. Qasem Soleimani's visit to Moscow in July 2015. Gen. Soleimani was reportedly sent to Syria by the supreme leader of Iran himself, Ali Khamenei, in order to discuss military matters with his Russian counterparts and coordinate a joint escalation of forces in Syria.

One month before the offensive south of Aleppo, the military launched another operation east of the city in an attempt to break the two-year siege of the Kuweyres military air base.

Major General Qasem Soleimani reportedly traveled from Latakia Governorate's northeastern countryside to the Al-Safeera District of southern Aleppo in order to personally oversee the first phase of the large-scale offensive in the Azzan Mountains. Soleimani did not travel alone to Aleppo – he was escorted by a large convoy of armored vehicles that were largely made up of Iraqi Shi’i militiamen; these aforementioned fighters were tasked with carrying out the planned operations around the Aleppo Governorate's countryside. Major General Suleimani traveled to Syria on the night of 12 October, to meet with the Iranian and Russian military advisors overseeing the large-scale operations around the Aleppo Governorate's rural terrain. He was joined by six other senior military officers from the Iranian Revolutionary Guard.

== The offensive ==
=== Syrian Government offensive ===
At 10 A.M. (Damascus Time) on the morning of 16 October, the Syrian Arab Army (SAA) – in coordination with Hezbollah, the National Defense Forces (NDF), and Al-Ba'ath Battalions – launched their large-scale southern Aleppo offensive after almost one year of inactivity along this rural area in the Azzan Mountains. According to field reports from the provincial capital, the Syrian Armed Forces and Hezbollah captured four sites from the Islamist rebels of Jabhat Al-Shamiyah (Levantine Front), Harakat Ahrar Al-Sham, and the Free Syrian Army (FSA), killing a number of combatants in the process of their advance in the Aleppo Governorate's southern countryside.

On 17 October, government forces backed by Shi'ite militia captured several villages, along with the Defense Battalion Base and the farms surrounding it. By the next day, the military was in control of five villages, while it was unclear who controlled al-Shgaydalah after a rebel-counterattack to retake it from the Army. The counterattack was carried out by Sham Revolutionary Brigades and Division 13, the latter a CIA-funded secular group, with videos showing a TOW missile attack destroying a bulldozer and later capturing a BMP-1.

On 19 October, government forces captured three hills. The commander of the Harakat Nour al-Din al-Zenki rebel group was killed in the fighting during the day. Since the beginning of the offensive, the Army lost at least 11 armored vehicles to TOW AT missiles, according to the SOHR. More weapons and ammunition were also supplied to the FSA including mortars and TOWs according to Issa Al-Turkmani, a Sultan Murad brigade spokesman. Saudi Arabia alone reportedly delivered 500 AT missiles, but another rebel spokesman said that the quantity of TOWs was inadequate for the scale of the assault, pointing out that once the missiles were distributed among the groups each ended up with just a couple of tubes, stating that they needed dozens more per group.

On 20 October, a rebel official stated the "losses are heavy on both sides and the regime’s advance is very slow". Meanwhile, tens of thousands of people reportedly fled the southern Aleppo countryside. Between 21 and 22 October, government forces took control of seven more villages. By this time, government forces reportedly lost at least 15 tanks, armored vehicles and bulldozers since the offensive begun.

=== ISIL offensives and first rebel counterattack ===
On 23 October, ISIL launched an attack on the Khanaser-Ethria highway (the main government supply route between Hama and Aleppo), after detonating two VBIED's, and captured 6 kilometres (3.7 miles) of a road. Subsequently, government forces recaptured some parts of it. The clashes over the next 24 hours left 28 ISIL fighters and 21 soldiers dead. The attack may have been designed to coincide with a rebel offensive in the Aleppo Governate in order to increase its chances of success. Elsewhere, 24 rebels, including the military leader of the Thwar al-Sham battalions and a commander of the Army of Mujahedeen, were killed in the southern Aleppo countryside, while a rebel spokesman claimed that SAA losses of vehicles had reached 21. At the end of the day, the rebels recaptured al-Hamra village, while government forces reportedly recaptured most of the Khanaser-Ethria highway.

On 24 October, Army sources reported that it had recaptured the western outskirts of Ithriyah, however the main supply route to Aleppo remained cut off. That day, a second leader in the Nur al-Din Zanki Movement was killed, while a rebel and NDF commander were wounded. The number of government fighters killed at the Khanaser-Ethria highway rose to at least 43. At the end of the day, ISIL launched an attack on the eastern suburbs of Aleppo city and captured Tal Reeman and Al-Salihiyah, before government fighters could repel their further attacks with the help of Russian airplanes.

On 25 October, rebels attacked, captured and eventually lost the strategically important cement plant area on the outskirts of Aleppo's Sheikh Saeed neighborhood after heavy clashes that led to the death of 14 government fighters and 10 rebels. Meanwhile, government forces reportedly recaptured two checkpoints along the Khanaser-Ethria highway, before a sandstorm forcibly halted all military operations in Aleppo. According to the SOHR, ISIL was still in control of parts of the highway, blocking the main supply route to Aleppo.

On 26 October, ISIL re-attacked the Khanaser-Ethria highway and captured a checkpoint, killing eight government fighters. Meanwhile, rebels recaptured Tell Hamiriyyeh hill and the Khalsa farms in the southern Aleppo countryside. The next day, ISIL also attacked the strategical town of As-Safira in southeastern Aleppo after detonating four VBIED's in the area. ISIL captured "key" military positions near the town and managed to enter Tel Aran. ISIL also managed to enter the northern district of As-Safira, but were pushed out with the help of reinforcements. Later that day, government forces regained their positions in the al-Safira area.

On 28 October, Russian airstrikes bombed a rebel headquarters in the Aleppo countryside and killed at least 7 rebels.

=== Renewed Syrian government advance ===
On 30 October, Syrian government forces recaptured the Tal Ithriya hill near the Khanaser–Ethria highway and repelled ISIL at Sheikh Hilal and Al-Sa’an. According to the same sources, the SAA also conducted an operation near the town of Khan Touman and captured farms located between the towns of Khan Touman and Qarassi in southern Aleppo. Between 31 October and 2 November, the SAA and its allies captured six villages in the southern countryside of Aleppo, as the rebels withdrew to their stronghold at Al-Hadher. A rebel counter-attack was reportedly unsuccessful.

On 2 November, ISIL captured the village of Ta’anah and its hill from Syrian troops, while the rebels reportedly recaptured "wide parts" of Jabal al-Banjira. The next day, government forces recaptured Al-Ta’anah.

Wider strategic view, including the North–western Syria offensive.

On 4 November, government troops regained control over the Khanasser–Ithriya Highway after twelve days of clashes with ISIL, killing seven fighters, four through beheading. While retreating towards al-Tabbaqa, a huge ISIS convoy was reportedly struck by Russian aircraft killing more than 50 militants in the airstrike.

On 5 November, rebels recaptured two villages but despite this, the Army captured the town of Kafr Haddad.

On 8 November, government forces captured three villages positioned directly south of Al-Hadhir, two of which the rebels retook the next day. The SAA re-took one of them on 10 November, as well as a further three.

By the end of 11 November, the rebels recaptured several areas, but the military continued its advances on 12 November with the capture of five more villages, as well as the key rebel town of Al-Hader.

On 13 November, government forces captured four villages and a hill, thus taking control of 341 km^{2} (132 sq mi) of territory. By the end of the day, they broke through to the west, capturing two villages and the ICARDA base, adjacent to the Idlib–Aleppo highway, cutting the road.

On 17 November, government forces captured Khalasah (known as Halash), after they advance from the nearby village Al-Hamraa. On the next day, rebels recaptured the Banes farms.

On 20 November, government troops captured Burj Al-Rumman and advanced to the village of Al-‘Umariyah, to the south-west of Al-Safira. At this point, the military halted their offensive, in expectation of the arrival of new T-90 tanks, which would come by the end of the month.

=== Second rebel counterattack ===
On 21 November, rebels launched a counter-offensive at Tal al-Eiss, By 23 November, the rebels recaptured seven villages and two hills. Al-Nusra seized a number of US-made Humvees from Shia militia near Tal Mamou.

On 28 November, the rebels recaptured al-Maryoudah village. However, by 29 November, the rebel assault on the southern perimeter of the village Al-Aziziyah failed from their positions at village Al-Makalah, and they withdrew to the south in order to evade air assaults from the Russian and Syrian Air Forces.

=== Syrian Army captures Khan Touman ===
Between 3 and 7 December, Syrian government forces recaptured three villages and two hills.

On 8 December, the rebels recaptured the village of Banes, the same day that government sources announced a third phase of the Southern Aleppo Offensive.

Between 12 and 13 December, government forces captured up to seven villages.

On 20 December, the Syrian Army captured the strategic town of Khan Tuman, as well as two nearby villages, several hills and the Khan Touman Ammunition Depot, along the Aleppo-Damascus Highway (M-5 Highway), cutting the primary rebel supply route from the provincial capital of the Idlib province toward the provincial capital of the Aleppo province. The Al-Zarbeh Poultry Farm was also seized. On the next day, government forces advanced further around Khan Tuman, taking control of two villages and two hills.

== Aftermath ==
On 11 January 2016, Syrian government forces launched an assault on the town of Al-Rashiddeen, to the southwest of Aleppo city, while also reportedly capturing two villages in Aleppo's southern countryside. On 28 January, they also seized the village of Blouzah.

On 3 February, the rebels recaptured the village of Al-Khalidiyah, near Khan Touman, thus reopening their supply line via the Aleppo-Damascus Highway (M-5 Highway). However, it was reported government troops recaptured Al-Khalidiyah three days later.

== Strategic analysis ==
Christopher Kozak of the Institute for the Study of War speculated that the assault was nothing more than a diversionary tactic intended to move rebel forces away from reopening the access to the Shi'ite towns of Nubl and al-Zahraa and cut the Aleppo–Turkey highway, their primary objective in his opinion. The Syrian Army eventually launched an offensive in Northern Aleppo on 1 February 2016 and broke the three-year siege of the two towns, effectively cutting the Aleppo–Turkey supply route.

Hezbollah's main incentive in participating in the offensive is believed to be similar to their agenda elsewhere, securing Shi'ite villages. Their ultimate objective is believed to be reaching the villages of Kafriya and Al-Fu'ah, thus lifting the siege imposed by Al-Nusra Front.

With reportedly hundreds of square kilometers brought under government control within the span of the first month of the offensive, Al-Masdar concluded that the overall effectiveness of both the senior Iranian revolutionary guards on the ground as well as the close Russian air-support have been noted as part of the main array of factors leading to a revitalized advance by government forces.

The son of Abdullah Azzam, Huthaifa Azzam, demanded mobilization for Aleppo.

== See also ==
- Battle of Aleppo (2012–2016)
- Kuweires offensive (September–November 2015)
- East Aleppo offensive (2015–2016)
- Northern Aleppo offensive (2016)
