= Qanat-e Malek, Kerman =

Village in Iran

Qanat-e Malek قنات ملک
- Village
- Location within Iran
- Coordinates: 29°16′48″N 57°02′42″E
- Country: Iran
- Province: Kerman
- County: Rabor
- Bakhsh: Hanza
- Rural District: Javaran

Population (2006)
  - Total: 338
- Time zone: UTC+3:30 (IRST)
  - Summer (DST): UTC+4:30 (IRDT)
- Another name: Bakhtiari-Abad

Qanat-e Malek (Persian: قنات ملک, also Romanized as Qanât-e Malek and Ghanat-e Malek), also known as Kahnau Malik or Kahnū Malek (کهنو ملک), is a village in Javaran Rural District, Hanza District, Rabor County, Kerman Province, Iran. At the 2006 census, its population was 338, in 77 families.

Qasem Soleimani, an eminent Iranian military commander who was known by his assassination by Americans, was born in this village on 11 March 1957. He was a Lieutenant general in the Islamic Revolutionary Guard Corps from 1998 until his death, the commander of its Quds Force, a division primarily in charge of clandestine extraterritorial military operations.

The mosque was partly built by his father, Hajj Hassan Soleimani.

== Notable people ==
- Qasem Soleimani (1957-2020), a general in Islamic Revolutionary Guard Corps who was assassinated in 2020
