= Carl E. Duckett =

American intelligence officer

Carl Ernest Duckett (March 22, 1923 – April 1, 1992) was an American intelligence officer known for being the founder of the Central Intelligence Agency's science and technology operations.

== Background ==
Carl Duckett was born and raised in Swannanoa, North Carolina, an unincorporated community a few miles east of Asheville. He attended the Buncombe County schools in Swannanoa, graduating from high school in 1940. His father was a construction laborer at the Beacon Blanket Manufacturing Company, the epicenter of the Swannanoa community, and he wanted his son to start a career at the mill. Carl’s ambition, however, was to work in radio broadcasting, and he left Swannanoa to search for work in this field.

With a good speaking voice, some musical talent, and a very persuasive nature, Duckett eventually found beginner employment at WMVA, a small station being established in Martinsville, Virginia. While there, he married Nannie Jane Law in 1941, and started a family. He also gained an elementary knowledge of radio electronics, and, to prepare for a better job, attended part-time for six months a course in this field at the nearby Danville Technical Institute.

In early 1943, Duckett was employed as a technician by Westinghouse Electric in Baltimore, Maryland. Apparently a fast learner, he was soon assigned to work on Army radars for anti-aircraft fire control. During this period, he also attended courses in radio engineering under the Government-sponsored Engineering, Science, and Management War Training (ESMWT) Program at Johns Hopkins University. In 1944, he was a member of a team sent to England to advise on the use of Westinghouse SCR-584 radar equipment for V-1 ‘buzz bomb’ defense, and stayed as a field engineer during the Normandy invasion.

Drafted into the U.S. Army in October 1944, Duckett served in the Signal Corps until July 1946. As a radar specialist, he rapidly advanced from Private to Master Sergeant, with assignments that included the Radiation Laboratory (Rad Lab) at MIT, the Pacific Theater of Operations, and the White Sands Proving Grounds (WSPG) in New Mexico. While at White Sands, he participated in the first launch in the U.S. of a captured German V-2 rocket and gained knowledge of the telemetry equipment used in this testing.

Following his discharge from the Army, Duckett returned to radio broadcasting in Martinsville. He also received a First-Class Commercial Radiotelephone License from the Federal Communications Commission, making him eligible for higher positions in this field, and joined in establishing radio station WBOB in Galax, Virginia. After the station went on the air in April 1947, he was not only the chief engineer but also served as the station manager and an announcer/disk jockey. Highly aggressive in these activities, he was one of the founders of a Virginia-wide association of news broadcasters (1949) and represented Virginia radio stations in a meeting with President Harry S. Truman (1950). He also promoted a bluegrass music group that made hit records and, later, performed before Elizabeth II, Queen of the United Kingdom.

== Telemetry and intelligence ==
At the end of World War II when Duckett was discharged from the Army, he had remained in the Reserves. As the Korean War started, he was called back to active duty in October 1950, and soon received a direct commission as a Second Lieutenant. After completing the Signal Officer’s School at Fort Monmouth, New Jersey, he was again assigned to White Sands. There his progressive duties included Commander of a remotely located radar station, Chief of the Radar Instrumentation Division, and Project Manager of the first test-range microwave communication system. He was promoted to First Lieutenant and remained at White Sands until reverting to Retired Reserves status in June 1953. Three years later, he received the rank of Captain in the Reserves.

Upon leaving Army active duty, Duckett remained at White Sands as a civil-service employee. During a three-year tenure at WSPG, he progressed from General Schedule (GS) Grade 12 to Grade 15 in positions that included Deputy Assistant for Engineering; Chief, Plans and Programs Office; and Scientific Advisor to the Signal Officer.

The team of German scientists and engineers under Wernher von Braun, initially brought to the U.S. under Operation Paperclip, had worked at Fort Bliss, Texas, and tested their missiles at nearby WSPG. After being moved to Redstone Arsenal, Huntsville, Alabama, in 1950, they continued to use the ranges at White Sands. While in the Army and in civil service positions, Duckett worked closely with this team and others from Redstone Arsenal, and became intimately familiar with the telemetry systems that were originally developed in Germany at the Peenemünde Army Research Center, as well as the newer American derivative systems.

Activities at Redstone Arsenal evolved from the small Ordnance Guided Missile Center in 1950, through the development of the Redstone Rocket, and the opening of the Army Ballistic Missile Agency (ABMA) in 1956. The ABMA was responsible for a wide variety of missiles, including Jupiter, the Army’s first medium-range ballistic missile. In July 1956, Duckett accepted a civil service position with the ABMA, joining the Guidance and Control Laboratory as a telemetry specialist and serving as a Scientific Advisor to the Commanding Officer, Major General John B. Medaris.

In the mid-1950s, the National Security Agency (NSA) set up a listening station near the coastal town of Sinop, Turkey, directly across the Black Sea from the Kapustin Yar range, where the Soviets were testing medium-range missiles. In early 1957, it became known that the Soviet Union was testing an intercontinental ballistic missile (ICBM) at their Tyuratam range and soon a listening station was opened by the Central Intelligence Agency (CIA) at Behshahr in northeast Iran, some 1,000 miles (1,600 km) across the Caspian Sea. Tapes were made of signals obtained by these listening post, and an ad hoc activity called Jam Session was started by the CIA for their interpretation; Duckett was a Jam Session participant. They soon recognized that the Russians were using the same telemetry frequencies and formats originally developed by the Germans during World War II.

On October 4, 1957, America was shaken by the launch by the Soviet Union of the first artificial satellite, Sputnik I. The U.S. Air Force and the CIA assembled a highly secret Telemetry and Beacon Analysis Committee (TABAC) to analyze the signals recorded from the launch at Tyuratam and those heard all over the world from Sputnik. From his work in Jam Session, Duckett was asked to be a leader in the TABAC effort. It required about 18 months to calibrate the signals and understand how they related to the launch vehicle characteristics. The payoff, however, was significant; for the next two decades this provided the U.S a major window into the operation of Soviet missiles.

In mid-1958, the ABMA was absorbed into the newly formed Army Ordnance Missile Command (AOMC), headquartered on Redstone Arsenal. At that time, a small Signals Intelligence Group, led by Duckett, was established as a separate unit. In early 1961, the Department of Defense (DoD) formed the Defense Intelligence Agency (DIA), integrating all of the defense intelligence in the DoD. The AOMC had the DoD’s most extensive capability for analyzing missiles; thus, to support the DIA, in December the Missile Intelligence Office (MIO) was made an official organization on the AOMC Commanding General’s Staff; Duckett was named Chief of the MIO.

From the start, one of the most significant activities of the MIO was the analysis of public and clandestine photographs of Soviet missiles and their launch sites, and from these and telemetry signals, estimating the missile capabilities. Sometimes models of the pictured missiles were built and tested in the AOMC wind tunnels for determining their aerodynamic characteristics.

Starting in mid-1956, the CIA began U-2 aircraft flights over the Union of Soviet Socialist Republics (USSR) and the People’s Republic of China (PRC). These carried cameras that provided pictures with a resolution of 2.5 feet (0.76 m) from an altitude of 60,000 feet (18,000 m) and higher; they were of great value in identifying missiles being manufactured and on the launch sites. In mid-1959, the CIA initiated CORONA, the program name for a series of satellites with increasingly more accurate cameras. The exposed film was ejected in a capsule with a parachute and then caught in the air by aircraft. The first successful mission, designated Keyhole 1 (KH-1), took place in August 1960. Some 1,400 photos were taken, covering more of the Soviet Union than all of the prior U-2 overflights combined. The resolution, however, was nowhere close to that obtained from U-2 cameras.,

In August 1962, the AOMC was expanded to become the Army Missile Command (AMC) and the MIO became the Missile Intelligence Directorate (MID), with Duckett as the Director. Duckett and others from the MID participated in the CORONA photo interpretation. The Committee on Overhead Reconnaissance (COR) was formed by the CIA to select areas for imaging; Duckett was a COR member. As the Cold War between America and the Soviet Union intensified, the COR selected Cuba as an imaging target.

The Cuban Missile Crisis began in September 1962, when CORONA imagery indicated likely missile launch sites being surreptitiously built at several sites across the island. On October 14, to obtain clearer images, U-2 reconnaissance aircraft flew over the suspected areas, each flight obtaining about 4,000 pictures. A joint CIA and DoD activity called Photographic Interpretation Center (PGIC) was responsible for interpreting such data. Led by Duckett, a team of image interpreters from the MID assembled at the PGIC and quickly released its top secret report identifying the sites as those for Soviet R-12 Dvina (NATO designation SS-4 Sandal) medium-range ballistic missiles, and Soviet R-14 Chusovaya (NATO designation SS-5 Skean) intermediate-range ballistic missiles. President John F. Kennedy imposed a military blockade of Cuba, and the confrontation ended on October 28, 1962, when Soviet Premier Nikita Khrushchev agreed to dismantle the offensive missiles and return them to the USSR.

== Central Intelligence Agency ==
The Central Intelligence Agency was formed in July 1947, at the direction of President Harry S. Truman. The CIA would be headed by a Director of Central Intelligence (DCI), reporting directly to the President. From the start, and for several following years, it was not widely accepted that the CIA was responsible for producing scientific intelligence.

The great importance of science and technology in intelligence was clearly shown in the Cuban Missile Crisis. Thus, in August 1963, a number of technical operations in the three existing directorates of the CIA were consolidated to form the Deputy Directorate of Science and Technology (DDS&T) with Albert D. Wheelon as the leader. In November, a Foreign Missile and Space Analysis Center (FMSAC) was formed in the DDS&T. Having worked with him on Jam Session and TABAC, Wheelon was well aware of Duckett’s capabilities, and enticed him to leave the MID in Huntsville and head the FMSAC.

During the next several years, Duckett and the FMSAC were kept busy with Soviet accomplishments: Cosmos reconnaissance and Molniya communication spacecraft; Voshod-2 and the first spacewalk and Venera missions past Venus in 1965; and the Luna soft landing on the Moon and the transmission of surface images in 1966 that put the Soviets ahead in the Moon race. Of perhaps greater concern were Soviet ballistic missiles: third-generation ICBMs (NATO designations SS-9, SS-11, and SS-13), as well as submarine-launched intermediate-range ballistic missiles (IRBMs) that could easily reach U.S. territory.

In addition to telemetry, Duckett and the FMSAC analyzed radar, optical, and photographic information. For collection, the electronic intelligence receiving station in Iran continued, and other stations were established in Norway and on ships. A 150-foot (46 m) dish antenna at Stanford University was used to monitor Soviet radar signals after they bounced off the Moon. Chinese missile and nuclear programs were also monitored; for much of this the U-2 spy-plane was employed, including the ability to determine operating facilities by measuring their heat using infrared cameras, and to collect high-altitude gas samples from nuclear facility emissions. CORONA missions also continued, primarily using the KH-4A (1963–1964) and KH-4B (1967) satellites. These had resolutions of about 10 feet (3.0 m) and 6 feet (1.8 m), respectively, and carried two reentry vehicles, allowing each mission to cover some 18 million square miles.

While the activities of Duckett and the FMSAC were of great value to the CIA, they mainly involved analyses of existing events. Some of the Agency’s strategic consultants strongly suggested that more capability was needed in advancing the basic science and technology used both in collecting information and in predicting future actions of adversaries. This would involve increasing the size and capabilities of not just the FMSAC but those of Wheelon’s overall organization.

In May 1966, the organization became a much enlarged Directorate of Science & Technology (DS&T), and Duckett replaced Wheelon as leader. With this went the position of Deputy Director of the CIA. While Wheelon held a Ph.D. in physics from MIT and had earlier been a senior scientist at TRW, Duckett had no formal higher education and his only non-government experience was in small-town radio broadcasting. Nevertheless, he was accepted as a leader by scientists and engineers; he was an excellent briefer, "turning technical data into laymanese," and was considered by many to be the Agency’s best "marketeer" in selling CIA programs to Congress. Because of his ability to explain technical matters in understandable terms, National Security Advisor Henry Kissinger often referred to him as "Professor."

For the next ten years, Duckett served the Nation in this capacity. In addition to the FMSAC, Offices reporting directly to Duckett included Computer Services, Electronic Intelligence, Scientfifc Intelligence, Special Activities, Special Projects, and Research and Development. In 1973, several organizational changes were made: the FMSAC was enlarged to become the Office of Weapons Intelligence, and the Office of Technical Services (OTS) was formed by consolidating activities from other directorates. The OSP became the Office of Development and Engineering, charged with serving the entire CIA. Also, the National Photographic Interpretation Center was placed under the DS&T.

The new OTS was charged with moving research and development technologies into operations. Included were ‘James Bond’ devices such as guns disguised as pens and cigarettes; clandestine listening, recording, and transitting devices; special envelopes and other holders of microfilm for dead-drop use; and materials for destroying equipment and incapacitating vehicles. Duckett took a personal interest in many of these projects.

Duckett’s DS&T was then a complete intelligence service; it established requirements, developed and operated collection systems, and analyzed the data. For his last three years with the CIA, Duckett also served on the Executive Management Committee. In this position, he was the Number Three executive of the Agency, with broad management and fiscal responsibilities for all CIA programs and activities.

Starting in January 1967, Duckett was also the Director of Program B of the National Reconnaissance Office (NRO). Upon the recommendation of President Dwight D. Eisenhower, the NRO had been established by the Department of Defense in 1960, primarily because of problems in space-reconnaissance management within the Air Force. The existence and operation of the highly secret NRO was divulged by the New York Times in 1985. For 10 years, Duckett held this NRO position in parallel with his position in the CIA.

In June 1976, after 13 years in senior positions and serving under nine DCIs, Duckett retired from the CIA. His request for retirement officially cited health reasons, but privately he said that it was because the new DCI, George H. W. Bush, would not promote him to Deputy DCI. Both reasons were likely true; he had a problem with alcoholism (later overcome), and for some time had been disappointed in not being further promoted to either of the top two positions.

== Achievements at the CIA ==
=== Overhead reconnaissance ===
During Duckett’s tenure as Director of the DS&T, overhead reconnaissance for gathering intelligence was a major activity. The U-2 spy planes were still active, particularly in flights over China operating from Taiwan. China’s first nuclear fusion (hydrogen) bomb had been detonated on June 17, 1967, and the test site was thoroughly photographed just days earlier. The planes, cameras, and signals intelligence (SIGINT) equipment were continually improved. A typical flight carrying a payload of 3,000 pounds could last seven or more hours, mainly at an altitude of over 70,000 feet (21,000 m). The last U-2 flights were in mid-1974, surveying the results of the Arab-Israeli conflict.

Even before the 1960 U-2 incident involving a plane shot down over Russia and ending such photoreconnaissance of that country, the CIA was having developed a successor aircraft, the A-12 Oxcart. With greater "sprint" speed (Mach 3.1), reduced radar cross-section, and capable of higher altitude (about 84,000 feet), the A-12 become operational in May 1967; at that time reconnaissance flights over North Vietnam were conducted out of Okinawa Island. Early the next year, flights were also made in support of the Pueblo Crisis with North Korea.

Another reconnaissance aircraft had been developed for the Air Force; the R-12, later designated the Lockheed SR-71 Blackbird. With operational characteristics similar to those of the A-12, the SR-71 had an advantage in also carrying infrared detectors, side-looking radar, and ELINT gear. The CIA adopted the SR-71 in 1968, and this remained the standard high-altitude reconnaissance aircraft until 1998, without a single loss to enemy action.

Filming through CORONA missions was still important, and a new satellite system was placed into development. Commonly called "Big Bird" but officially designated KH-9 HEXAGON, each satellite involved a 30,000-pound cylinder 40 feet (12 m) long and 10 feet (3.0 m) in diameter, carrying four reentry capsules. There were two KH-9 cameras capable of independent operation and with a resolution of two feet. In addition, each HEXAGON carried SIGNIT electronics, collecting Soviet transmissions and also relaying messages sent by cover agents. The first HEXAGON satellite was launched by a Titan 3D in June 1971. Duckett considered the Big Bird one of his most important accomplishments.

The time lag involved in overhead-photography imaging systems and the advances being made in electro-optical imaging devices led to a detailed examination of real-time reconnaissance technologies starting in 1969. Duckett tasked Leslie C. Dirks, one of his most capable researchers, with assessing the present and projected technologies, and, with Edwin H. Land (inventor of the Polaroid Instant Camera and senior advisor to the CIA), preparing a plan for the replacement of CORONA. The resulting plan was strongly opposed by the Air Force, but, after personally hearing arguments from both sides in 1971, President Richard Nixon approved Duckett’s approach.

After the President’s approval, the KH-11 KENNEN Program was started, with Lockheed selected as the prime contractor and Perkin-Elmer grinding the very important collecting mirror. Likely the most secret of all CIA reconnaissance systems, each KH-11 had a charge-coupled device (CCD) electro-optical sensor and an 8.7-foot (2.7 m) collecting mirror. The digital images were transmitted as real-time signals via a relay satellite to a ground station at Fort Belvoir, Virginia. The first KENNAN launch, by a Titan 3D rocket, took place in 1976, shortly after Dirks had replaced Duckett as the DS&T Director.

=== Electronic intelligence ===
With an early background in radio and radar, Duckett had a great personal interest in CIA activities in these fields. Also, Duckett’s FMASC depended strongly on information gained through electronic intelligence (ELINT).

As previously noted, the CIA had a receiving station in Iran to intercept telemetry signals coming from the Tyuratam test range. In 1965, this was augmented by two stations operated by the DS&T in the high mountains of northeastern Iran and nearer to Tyuratam; at their peak, these stations (designated TACKSMAN I 36.6846°N 53.5270°E and II 37.2957°N 58.9152°E) provided the bulk of information on Soviet ICBM development. The CIA also funded ELINT operations in Norway, both at a ground station in the far northeast near Kirkenes and on a converted whaling boat in the Barents Sea; these monitored Soviet radio communications and telemetry originating in northwest USSR.

Direct reception of radar signals is limited to line-of-sight distances – approximately to the horizon. However, by operating in the high-frequency (HF) band (3-30 MHz), the signals can be "bounced" along a path between the ionosphere and ground, allowing an "over-the-horizon" (OTH) operation. In early 1961, an OTH radar facility, designated EARTHLING, was set up in Pakistan to track missile and spacecraft launches from the Tyuratam test range. Through 1965, when the facility was closed by Pakistan, over 80 percent of the missile launches had been detected. EARTHLING also provided information on the Soviet's nuclear tests at high altitudes. An OTH radar, designated CHECKROTE, was opened on Taiwan in 1966; this was primarily to monitor missile launches from the Shuangchengzi test range in China. Greatly upgraded in 1969, CHECKROTE was a highly successful project.

A very important intelligence item in the 1960-70s was the characteristics of Soviet radars, particularly those systems associated with their defense systems against bombers and ballistic missiles. U-2 and A-12 aircraft flew special missions to gather this information. The most novel collection means was through signals from Soviet radars reflected by the moon; a facility for such collection was set up by the CIA at Stanford University in 1966.

Shortly after he became the Director of the DS&T, Wheelon had proposed using a geosynchronous satellite to relay very-high and ultra-high frequency (VHF and UHF) telemetry signals from Soviet test sites to CIA control stations. (VHF and UHF signals cannot be directly received beyond the horizon because they are passed through, not reflected by, the ionosphere.) At the start of 1966, development of such a monitoring system, designated RHYOLITE, got underway. In a few months, Duckett took over the DS&T and implementation of the RHYOLITE program. A receiving/control site 23.799°S 133.735°E was selected near Alice Springs in the Australian Outback, safe from eavesdropping and signal interference by Soviet spy ships.

The first RHYOLITE satellite was launched into its 22,300-mile (35,900 km) high, geostationary orbit by an Atlas-Agena D rocket in June 1969. The primary mission was to monitor Soviet missile tests, but it was also capable of intercepting VHF and UHF communications; it found great usefulness in the Indo-Pakistani War of 1971, and later in the Vietnam War and subsequent conflicts.

=== Missile intelligence and Safeguard ===
In March 1969, newly elected President Richard Nixon announced to the public that he was authorizing the implementation of an anti-ballistic missile system, called Safeguard, to counter a potentially devastating Soviet threat. At that time, there was a balance between the United States and the Soviet Union based on Mutual Assured Destruction; this assumed that a first strike could not eliminate the capability for retaliation.

Some studies had shown that Soviet ICBMs carrying multiple independently targetable reentry vehicles (MIRVs) – several nuclear warheads aimed at different targets – could destroy a large part of U.S. ICBMs then emplaced in silos. In the fall of 1968, tests of SS-9 Mod 4 ICBMs had been monitored in which three warheads were dispensed, each supposedly capable of carrying up to five megaton-size nuclear bombs. The data, however, were not sufficient for the FMSAC to firmly determine if these were MIRVs or simply three warheads reentering in a row; this difference would have a major impact on their threat to the U.S. defense.

This was a subject of great debate for several months, and critical for Congress to reach a decision on President Nixon’s authorization for Safeguard. Although he had personally concluded that the Soviets did not have MIRV capability, Duckett prepared a paper objectively presenting both sides of the technical debate. On July 17, 1969, with only senators present, Duckett’s paper was read to the Senate. In the final vote on August 6, Vice President Spiro Agnew broke an even split in Congress by favoring the program. Although the effort was still shrouded in top secrecy, there were sufficient "leaks" to allow the news media to call attention to the role of the CIA in such matters.

=== Submarine espionage ===
In March 1968, a Soviet Golf class submarine imploded – generally believed to be while on the surface recharging its batteries – and sank in about 17,000 feet (5,200 m) of ocean some 1,700 miles (2,700 km) northwest of Hawaii. The Soviet Fleet immediately started a major effort to locate the sub, but gave up in a few weeks, The U.S. Navy’s Sound Surveillance System (SOSUS) – a network of hydrophone arrays – had initially tracked the sub, and triangulation had been used to identify the general location where the accident occurred. The Office of Naval Intelligence (ONI) then arranged for a spy submarine, the USS Halibut, to search for the missing sub. During the summer of 1968, long cables lowered lights and cameras, and in August found the sub broken into several large pieces. The forward 200-foot (61 m) section contained the sub’s three missile launch tubes, one with an apparently intact nuclear-tipped missile.

There was great interest in attempting a recovery of items such as cipher machines, code manuals, communications equipment, and possibly a torpedo or even a nuclear warhead. Both the Navy and the CIA started plans for a major salvage effort. The Navy proposed cutting into the sub’s hull and recovering whatever items could be reached. In a joint meeting, the Navy presented its recommended plan. They were staggered, however, when Duckett and the CIA team recommended a gigantic effort to recover an entire 200-foot (61 m) intact section, raising it the three miles (5 km) to the surface.

After an intense debate at all levels, Duckett’s proposal was eventually approved by President Richard Nixon. Howard Hughes agreed for his firm, Summa Corporation, to build a 618-foot (188 m) long ship (the Glomar Explorer, ostensibly a deep-water, manganese-mining vessel). This had a companion football-field-sized barge (the Hughes Marine Barge-1) that was carried below the ship and thus hidden from overhead observation. Eight giant claws operating from the barge would lift the intact section of the Golf sub from the ocean floor and into an opening on the bottom of the ship. The activity was code-name Project AZORIAN (sometimes JENNIFER), and publicly justified as a means of rescuing or recovering future U.S. vessels.

It was July 1974 before the Glomar and the Barge began the raising attempt. When the section was lifted about 3,000 feet (910 m) off the seabed, one of the claws broke, followed by a collapse and shattering of the entire section. All but a small portion – some 10 percent of the original sub – fell back to the ocean floor. The lost portions included the items most desired by the intelligence community. Six bodies were in the recovered section, and were given a formal burial at sea.

=== Parapsychology intelligence ===
In the early 1970s, two laser scientists at the Stanford Research Institute (SRI) began research in parapsychology. In a meeting with representatives of the DS&T, they claimed to have found witnesses of Soviet successes in psychokinetics – use of the mind for moving physical objects – and had themselves conducted positive research in mentally viewing remote objects and scenes – astral projection.

The CIA had long conducted research in the area of behavioral control. Throughout the 1950s and into the 1960s, there was extensive testing of the effects of hypnosis and drugs, particularly lysergic acid diethylamide (LSD) on human subjects. The bulk of these activities were conducted by the Technical Services Staff, forerunner of the Technical Services Department (TSD). Thus, when the SRI scientists presented their information on mind control, Duckett assigned this to the TSD.

In October 1972, the TSD initiated the Biofield Measurements Program, to be conducted jointly with SRI, to determine whether participants (the viewers or percipients) could reliably identify and accurately describe salient features of remote locations or targets. This was in part justified by attempts to find what progress the Soviets were making in parapsychology and how it might be used against the United States. Two test subjects (persons claiming paranormal abilities) were provided by the SRI. Early in the following year, reported successes in "remote viewing" by the percipients were such that other units of the DS&T joined in the effort. A management review of the program was made in the summer of 1973, and both Duckett and the CIA Executive Director William Colby allowed the activity to continue.

A carefully planned experiment was conducted in July 1974. Duckett asked that this center on a description made by remote viewing of a target area in the Soviet Union that had been recently imaged by a satellite and suspected to be a nuclear test site. In sessions over a four-day period, the test subjects gave mentally derived descriptions of the site; these descriptions were then independently evaluated by a scientist from the Los Alamos National Laboratory The overall judgement of the evaluator was that the remote viewing appeared to be a failure; nevertheless, continued low-level research in parapsychology intelligence was allowed by Duckett until he retired in June 1976.

== Controversy at the CIA ==
Duckett was aware of the ongoing experiments being conducted on U.S. servicemen at Edgewood, in which the CIA had commercial drug manufacturers provide them with samples of drugs rejected for commercial sale in order to study how their "unfavorable side effects" would modify behavior. Duckett maintained that the experiments were not being conducted for offensive purposes stating that they were "defensive, in the sense that we would be able to recognize certain behavior if similar materials were used against Americans." In the disclosed CIA Family Jewels document, he was on record as saying that he thought "the Director would be ill-advised to say he is acquainted with this program (meaning Edgewood)."

== Post CIA and miscellaneous ==
After retiring from the CIA in 1976, Carl Duckett joined the firm Intec, Inc., of McLean, Virginia, as Chairman of the Board and President. He had retained top levels of security clearance and, through Intec, provided a number of aerospace industries with consulting services and analytical studies in technical intelligence and electronic warfare. He also served on advisory panels for the Senate Select Committee for Intelligence and the President’s Foreign Intelligence Advisory Board. Having earlier been divorced, he married Ann Marie Bell in 1978.

In 1985, Duckett opened an Intec office at Mathews Court House, Virginia, and moved his residence to a bay-side farm near Hudgins, Virginia. For a period of time, he also served as the Magistrate of Mathews County, Virginia. He continued working for Intec until early 1992, but died of lung cancer in a medical center at Newport News, Virginia, on April 1, 1992, and was buried in the Gwynn’s Island Cemetery near his farm. He was survived by his wife, Ann Marie, and, from his first marriage, Nannie Jane; two sons, Ernest Pannell (1942) and Arthur Lee (1946); and a daughter, Ruth Eleanor (1948).

In his professional career, Carl Duckett received the following special awards and decorations:

- Distinguished Intelligence Medal (CIA—twice received)
- Commendation Medal (U. S. Army)
- Leadership Award National Civil Service Reform League
- George Goddard Award (SPIE, Soc. of Photo-Optical Instrumentation Engrs.)
- Control, Communications, and Intelligence Award (Association of Old Crows).

As a part of its 50th anniversary celebration in 1997, the Central Intelligence Agency gave Trailblazer Awards to 50 Agency officers, "from our earliest days to the present, who by their actions, example, innovations, or initiative, have taken the CIA in important new directions and helped shape our history." Carl E. Duckett was one of the honored recipients of a Trailblazer Award.
