= Soviet submarine K-129 (1960) =

Golf II-class ballistic missile submarine

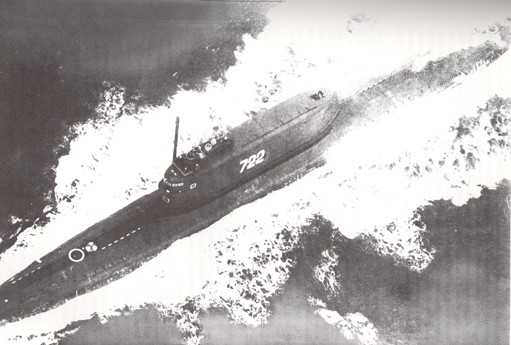
- Golf II-class ballistic missile submarine K-129, hull number 722

History

Soviet Union
- Name: К-129
- Ordered: 26 January 1954
- Builder: Nr. 132 Komsomol Na Amur
- Completed: 1959
- Fate: Sank on 8 March 1968 approximately 1,560 nautical miles (2,890 km) northwest of Oahu in the Pacific Ocean with all 98 hands
- Notes: Partially recovered in covert salvage operation by the CIA in 1974

General characteristics
- Class & type: Golf II-class ballistic missile submarine
- Displacement: 2,700 t (2,700 long tons) submerged
- Length: 100 m (330 ft)
- Beam: 8.5 m (28 ft)
- Draft: 8.5 m (28 ft)
- Propulsion: 3 × diesel engines, each 1,500 kW (2,000 bhp); 3 × electric motors, 3,880 kW (5,200 shp); 3 shafts
- Speed: 15–17 knots (28–31 km/h) surfaced; 12–14 knots (22–26 km/h) submerged
- Endurance: 70 days
- Complement: 83, 20 officers and 63 enlists
- Armament: D-4 launch system with 3 × SS-N-5 Serb) missiles
- Notes: Said to be armed with SS-N-5 Serb missile with 750–900 nmi (1,390–1,670 km) range and 1-megaton warhead

K-129 was a Project 629A (Russian: проект 629А, proyekt 629A; NATO reporting name: Golf II-class) diesel-electric-powered ballistic missile submarine that served in the Pacific Fleet of the Soviet Navy. It was one of six Project 629 strategic ballistic-missile submarines assigned to the 15th Submarine Squadron based at Rybachiy Naval Base near Petropavlovsk-Kamchatsky.

K-129's commander was Captain First Rank Vladimir I. Kobzar, and she carried the hull number 722 on her final deployment, during which she sank on 8 March 1968 along with her missiles and their nuclear warheads. This was one of four submarine disappearances in 1968, the others being the Israeli submarine INS Dakar, the French submarine Minerve, and the American nuclear-powered submarine USS Scorpion.

After nearly two weeks of radio silence during her patrol in the Pacific Ocean, the Soviet Navy officials became concerned about her status and reportedly deployed large numbers of military aircraft and ships to search for the vessel, but no sign or wreckage was found. With the U.S. Navy observing the Soviet efforts, the Americans also began searching, ultimately determining the exact coordinates of the wreck utilizing underwater acoustic data in August 1968, hundreds of miles away from the Soviet search efforts.

In 1974, the United States attempted to recover the submarine in a secretive Cold War–era effort named Project Azorian. Only a part of the submarine was recovered from its position 4.9 km (16,000 ft) below the surface, making this the deepest attempt to raise a ship. The cover story was that the salvage vessel was engaged in commercial manganese nodule mining.

== Launch and operations ==
Project 629A submarine

The keel of K-129 was laid down on 15 March 1958 at Komsomolsk-on-Amur Shipyard No. 132. She was launched on 16 May 1959, with her acceptance certificate signed on 31 December 1959, and assigned to the 123rd Brigade, 40th Division of the Soviet Pacific Fleet at Vladivostok. In 1960, she was reassigned to 15th Submarine Squadron based at Rybachiy Naval Base in Kamchatka.

On 3 April 1964, K-129 underwent modernization under Project 629A at Dalzavod in Vladivostok, and re-entered service following completion of modernization on 30 May 1967. In January 1968, K-129 was assigned to the 15th Submarine Squadron as part of the 29th Ballistic Missile Division at Rybachiy, commanded by Admiral Viktor A. Dygalo.

== Sinking ==
K-129, having completed two 70-day ballistic-missile combat patrols in 1967, was tasked with her third patrol in February 1968, with an expected completion date of 5 May 1968. Upon departure on 24 February, K-129 reached deep water, conducted a test dive, returned to the surface and reported by radio that all was well, and proceeded on patrol.

Upon her final deployment, K-129's commander was Captain First Rank Vladimir I. Kobzar and Captain Second Rank Alexander M. Zhuravin was senior assistant to the commander (executive officer). She carried hull number 722 on her final deployment. No further communication was received from K‑129, despite normal radio check-ins expected when the submarine crossed the 180th meridian, and further when she arrived at her patrol area.

By mid-March, Soviet Navy commanders in Kamchatka became concerned because K-129 had missed two consecutive radio check-ins. First, K-129 was instructed by normal fleet broadcast to break radio silence and contact headquarters; later and more urgent communications all went unanswered. Soviet naval headquarters declared K-129 missing by the third week of March, and organized an air, surface, and underwater search-and-rescue effort in the North Pacific from Kamchatka and Vladivostok.

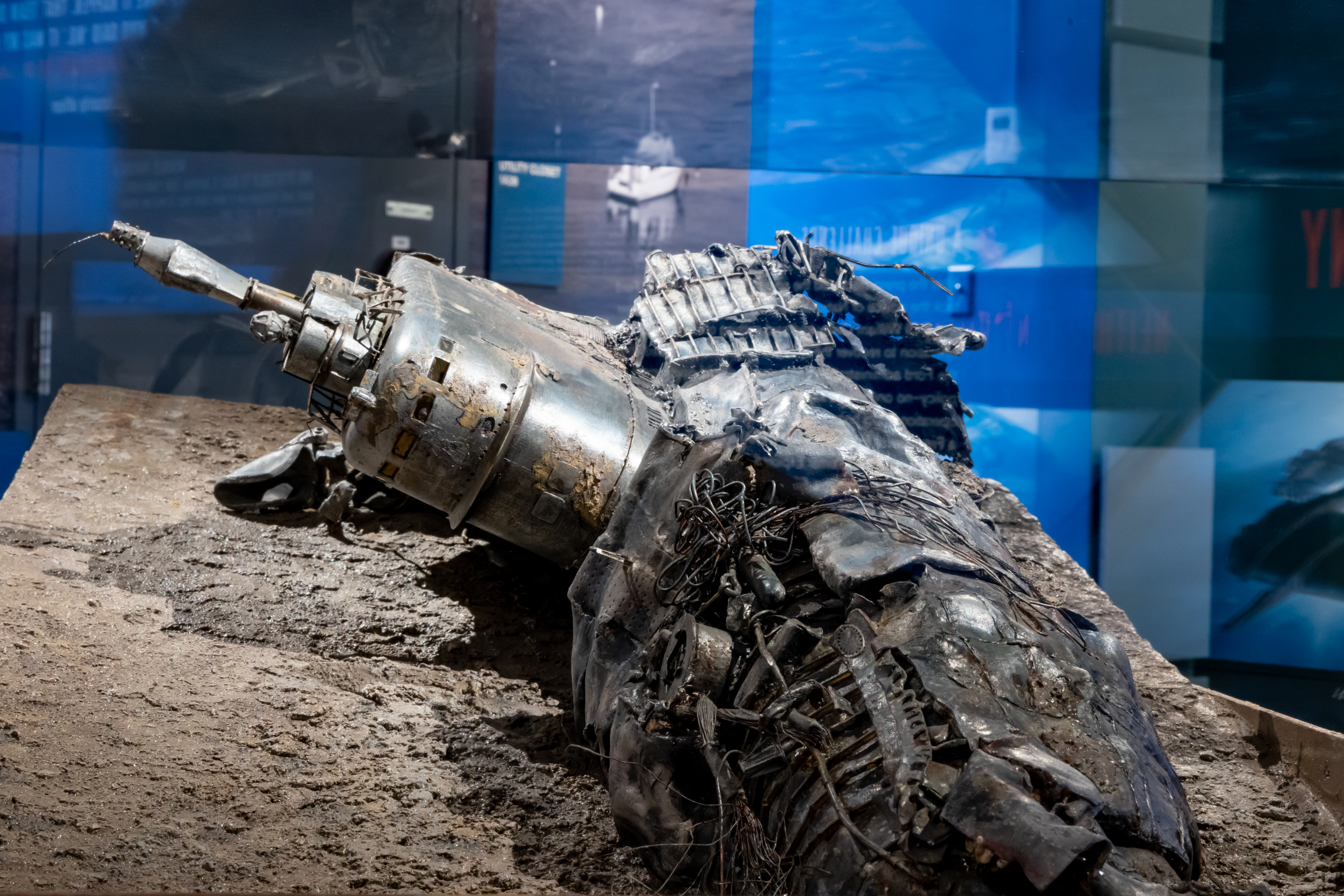
The model of the sunken and deteriorated K-129

This Soviet deployment in the Pacific was analyzed by U.S. intelligence as likely a reaction to a submarine loss. U.S. SOSUS naval facilities in the North Pacific were alerted and requested to review acoustic records on 8 March 1968 to identify any possible anomalous signal. Acoustic data from four Air Force AFTAC sites and the Adak, Alaska SOSUS array triangulated a potential event location to within 5 nautical miles, a site hundreds of miles away from where the Soviet Navy had been searching and in water around 16,500 feet (5,000 m) deep.

Several SOSUS stations recorded signals. According to Bruce Rule, a former lead acoustic analyst for the Office of Naval Intelligence, an initial significant acoustic signal from K-129 had been recorded by PACSOSUS on 11 March 1968. It was interpreted as a possible small explosion occurring in the pressure hull at 11:59:47. According to John P. Craven, an event was already recorded on 8 March 1968. Upon examination, it produced sufficient triangulation by lines-of-bearing to provide the U.S. Navy with a locus for the probable wreck site. One source characterized the acoustic signal as "an isolated, single sound of an explosion or implosion, 'a good-sized bang'." The acoustic event was reported to have originated near 40°N, 180° longitude.

Soviet search efforts, lacking the equivalent of the U.S. SOSUS system, failed to find K-129; and, eventually, Soviet naval activity in the North Pacific returned to normal. K-129 was subsequently declared lost with all hands.

== Recovery: Project Azorian ==
=== Location ===
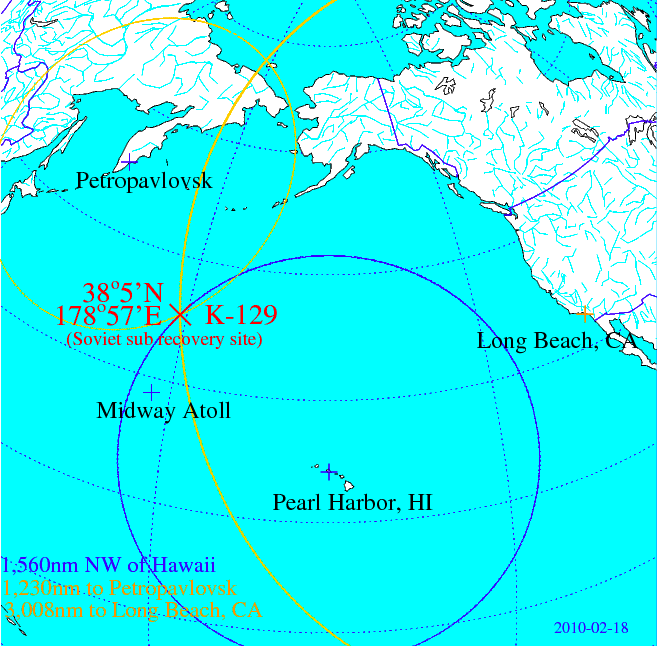
The recovery site of К-129 based on the intersection of three circles marking the distances to Long Beach, California; Pearl Harbor, Hawaii; and Petropavlovsk, Kamchatka

The wreck of K-129 was identified by USS Halibut northwest of Oahu at an approximate depth of 4,900 m (16,000 ft) on 20 August 1968. It was surveyed in detail over the next three weeks by Halibut – reportedly with over 20,000 close-up photos, and later also possibly by the bathyscaphe Trieste II. The location of the wreck remains an official secret of the United States intelligence services. John P. Craven, though, points to a location nearly 40°N, and almost exactly on the 180th meridian.

Hughes Glomar Explorer traveled 3,008 nautical miles from Long Beach, California, to reach the recovery site. CIA documents reveal that she sank "1,560 miles northwest of Hawaii". The International Atomic Energy Agency states that two nuclear warheads from K-129 were located in the Pacific 1,230 miles from Kamchatka at coordinates 40°6'N and 179°57'E at a depth of 6,000 metres (20,000 ft), and lists them as recovered. All three distances point to a location of 38°5′N 178°57′E, which is close to 600 nautical miles (1,100 km) north of the Midway Atoll. The CIA gives 5,010 and 5,030 metres (16,440 and 16,500 ft) for its approximate depth.

=== Secret recovery attempt ===
Given a unique opportunity to recover a Soviet SS-N-5 Serb nuclear missile without the knowledge of the Soviet Union, President Richard Nixon authorized a salvage attempt after consideration by the Secretary of Defense and the White House. To ensure the salvage attempt remained "black" (i.e., secret), the CIA, rather than the Navy, was asked to conduct the operation. Hughes Glomar Explorer was designed and built under CIA contract solely for the clandestine salvage of K-129. The cover story was that the ship would be mining manganese nodules on the sea floor. The salvage operation, named Project Azorian, was one of the most expensive and deepest secrets of the Cold War.

According to one account, in July–August 1974, Hughes Glomar Explorer grappled with and was able to lift the forward half of the wreck of K-129, but as it was being raised, the claw suffered a critical failure, resulting in the forward section breaking into two pieces with the all-important sail area and center section falling back to the ocean floor. Thus, the center sail area and the after portions of K-129 were allegedly not recovered. What exactly was retrieved in the section that was recovered is classified SECRET//NOFORN or Top Secret, but the Soviets assumed that the United States recovered torpedoes with nuclear warheads, operations manuals, code books, and coding machines. Another source (unofficial) states that the U.S. recovered the bow area, which contained two nuclear torpedoes, but no cryptographic equipment or code books.

=== Media and official reporting ===
Seymour Hersh of The New York Times uncovered some of the details of Project Azorian in 1974, but was kept from publication by the action of the Director of Central Intelligence, William Colby. Months after the salvage operation was completed, in February 1975, the Los Angeles Times ran a brief story regarding the CIA operation, which led The New York Times to release Hersh's story. Jack Anderson continued the story on national television in March 1975. The media called the operation Project Jennifer, which in 2010 was revealed to be incorrect, since Jennifer referred only to a security system that compartmentalized Azorian project data.

According to a report released by the US Navy, the pressure-hull of the 40-foot bow-section was intact forward of the break-point, but had been subject to massive internal destruction.

The United States announced that in the section they recovered were the bodies of six men. Due to radioactive contamination, the bodies were buried at sea in a steel chamber in September 1974, with full military honors about 90 nautical miles (167 km) southwest of Hawaii. The videotape of that ceremony was given to Russia by U.S. Director of Central Intelligence Robert Gates when he visited Moscow in October 1992. The relatives of the crew members were eventually shown the video some years later.

=== Continued secrecy ===
The recovery of K-129 has been stated to have been a failure, recovering only a small amount of insignificant parts of the submarine. The CIA argued in a Freedom of Information Act lawsuit, however, that the project had to be kept secret because any "official acknowledgment of involvement by U.S. government agencies would disclose the nature and purpose of the program." This response has entered the lexicon of legal jargon as "the Glomar response" or "glomarization" – "neither confirm nor deny".

As of 2018, the files, photographs, videotapes, and other documentary evidence remained closed to the public. A few pictures appeared in a 2010 documentary showing the K-129 wreck – the bow and the sail, with the missile compartment heavily damaged showing only one missile tube left attached to the structure.

== Causes ==
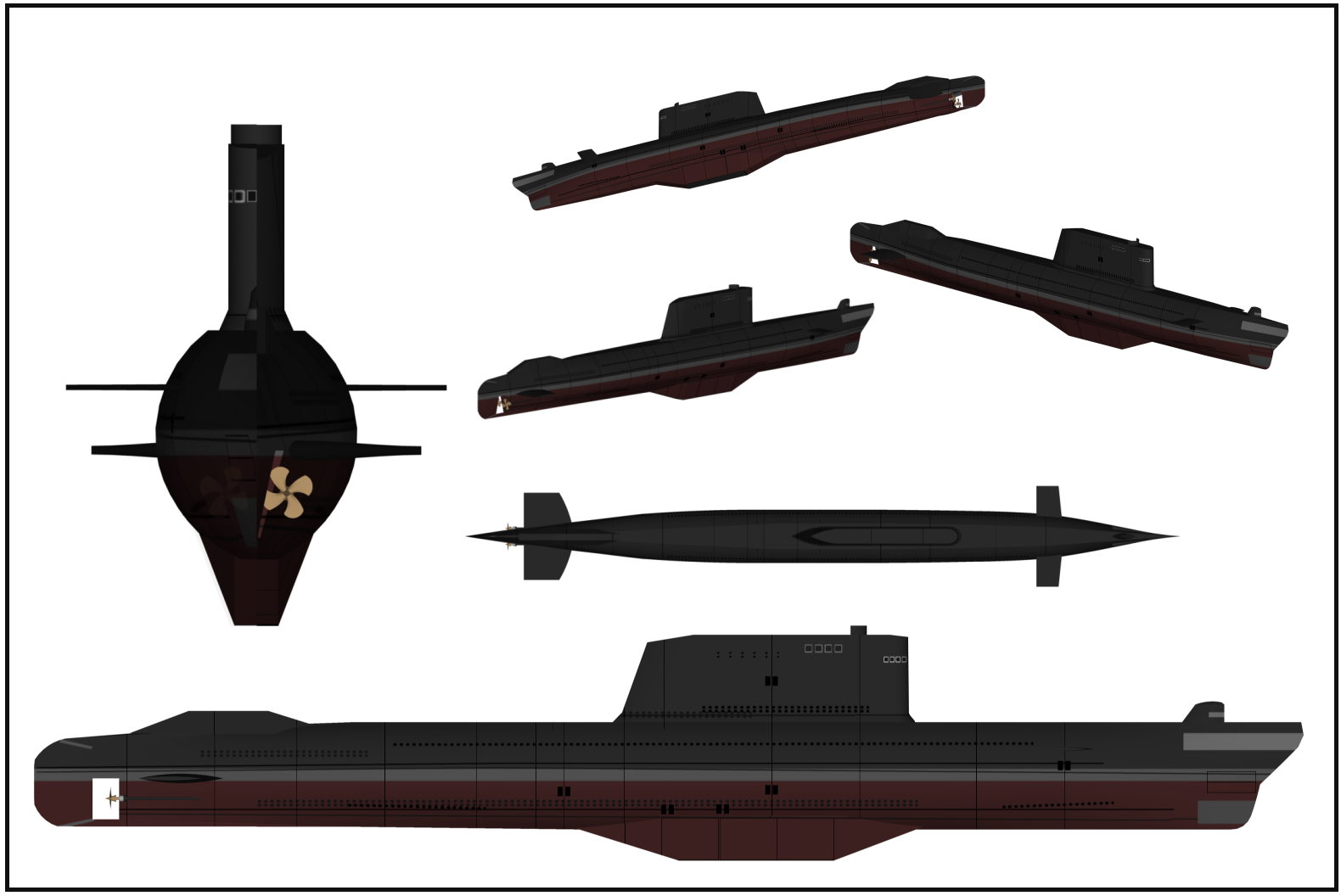
Profiles of a Project 629A (Golf II) ballistic-missile submarine like the K-129

The official Soviet Navy hypothesis is that K-129, while operating in snorkel mode, slipped below its operating depth. Such an event, combined with a mechanical failure or improper crew reaction, can cause flooding sufficient to sink the boat.

This account, however, has not been accepted by many, and alternative theories have been advanced to explain the loss of K-129:

1. A hydrogen explosion in the batteries while charging
2. A collision with USS Swordfish
3. A missile explosion caused by a leaking missile door seal
4. Intentional or unintentional scuttle by crew due to K-129 violating normal operating procedures and/or departing from authorized operating areas

Reportedly, as many as 40 of the complement of 98 were new to the submarine for this deployment.

K-129 was roughly midway through standard shore leave/replenishment and repair when a new mission was given.

=== Battery malfunction ===
Lead-acid batteries release explosive hydrogen gas while charging. The hydrogen gas, if not properly vented, could have accumulated into an explosive concentration.

John Craven, former chief scientist of the U.S. Navy's Special Projects Office and former head of the DSSP and DSRV programs, commented:

I have never seen or heard of a submarine disaster that was not accompanied by the notion that the battery blew up and started it all. [...] Naive investigators, examining the damage in salvaged battery compartments, invariably blame the sinking on battery explosions until they learn that any fully charged battery suddenly exposed to seawater will explode. It is an inevitable effect of a sinking and almost never a cause.

At least one American submarine, USS Cochino, though, was lost off Norway in 1949 due to a hydrogen explosion in the battery compartment. Most of Cochino's crew was rescued and the cause of her sinking is therefore known.

=== Alleged collision with USS Swordfish ===
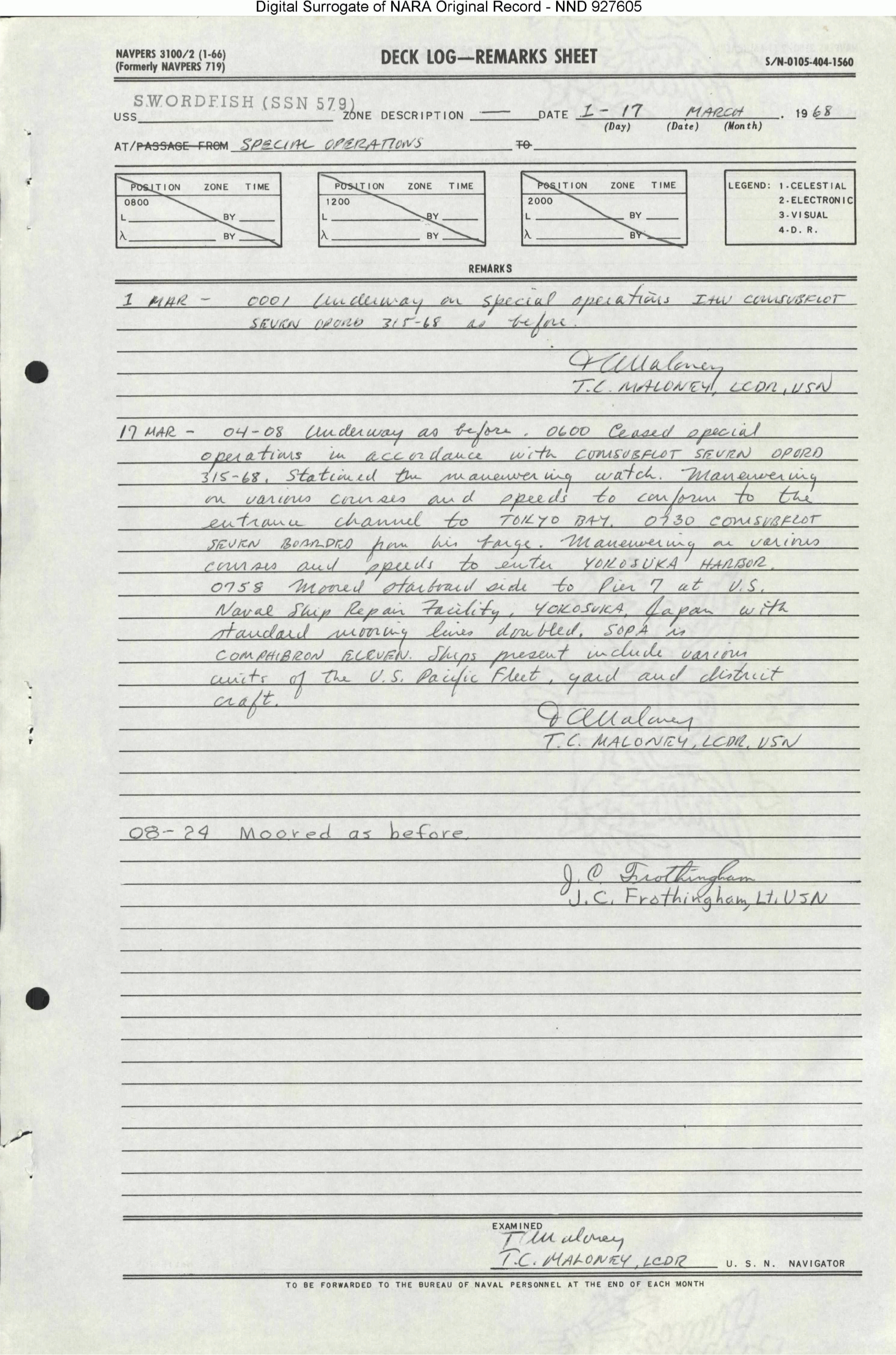
Deck Log Book USS Swordfish from March 1968, stating that she had been on "Special Operations" from 1 to 17 March 1968

Standard practice during the Cold War was for U.S. Navy attack submarines to trail Soviet missile submarines as they departed their home ports and moved into the North Pacific or the North Atlantic Oceans.

The collision hypothesis is the unofficial opinion of many Soviet Navy officers, and is officially denied by the U.S. Navy. According to U.S. Navy sources, USS Swordfish put into Yokosuka, Japan, on 17 March 1968, shortly after the disappearance of K-129, and received emergency repairs to a bent periscope, reportedly caused by ice impacted during surfacing while conducting classified operations in the Sea of Japan. The seizure of USS Pueblo by the North Korean government occurred in the Sea of Japan on 23 January 1968, and the U.S. Navy response to this incident included the deployment and maintenance of naval assets in the area off the eastern North Korean coast for some time thereafter.

In response to Russian efforts to ascertain whether K-129 had been lost due to damage resulting from a collision with a U.S. submarine, an official U.S. statement by Ambassador Malcolm Toon to a Russian delegation during a meeting in the Kremlin in August 1993 related:

At my request, U.S. naval intelligence searched the logs of all U.S. subs that were active in 1968. As a result, our Director of Naval Intelligence has concluded that no U.S. sub was within 300 nautical miles (560 km) of your sub when it sank.

A news release in 2000 demonstrates that Russian suspicion and sensitivity concerning the collision possibility, and indeed their preference for such an explanation, remains active:

As recently as 1999, Russian government officials complained that Washington was covering up its involvement. One accused the Americans of acting like a "criminal that had been caught and now claimed that guilt must be proved", according to the notes of a U.S. participant in a November 1999 meeting on the topic.

=== Explosion due to leaking missile hatch ===
On 3 October 1986, the Soviet Project 667A ballistic-missile submarine K-219, while on combat patrol in the Atlantic, suffered the explosion of a liquid-fueled R-27 missile in one of its 16 missile tubes. The cause of the explosion was a leaking missile tube hatch seal. The leak allowed sea water to come into contact with residue of the missile's propellants, which caused a spontaneous fire, resulting in an explosion first of the missile booster, then a subsequent explosion of the warhead detonator charge. In the case of the Project 667A, the missiles were located within the pressure hull, and the explosion did not cause damage sufficient to immediately sink the boat. It did, however, cause extensive radioactive contamination throughout, requiring the submarine to surface and the evacuation of the crew to the weather deck, and later to a rescue vessel, which had responded to the emergency. Subsequently, K-219 sank into the Hatteras Abyss with the loss of four crewmen, and rests at a depth around 5,500 m (18,000 ft). The Soviet Navy later claimed that the leak was caused by a collision with USS Augusta.

Some indicators suggest K-129 suffered a similar explosion in 1968. First, the radioactive contamination by weapons-grade plutonium of both the recovered bow section and the six crewmen of K-129 indicates the explosion of the warhead detonator charge of one of the missiles, before the ship reached its crush depth. The report that the forward section was crushed and that charring in the bow section indicated dieseling from an implosion (or alternatively from a fire), would indicate that the explosion occurred while K-129 was submerged and at depth. The report found in Blind Man's Bluff that the wreck revealed K-129 with a 3 m (10 ft) hole immediately abaft the conning tower would support the theory of an explosion of one of the three missiles in the sail (possibly missile number 3). Since K-129's missiles were housed in the sail, much less structural mass (compared to the K-219) was available to contain such an explosion, and loss of depth control of the submarine would be instantaneous.

A photograph taken by the cameras on the capture vehicle, though, as published in the White and Polmar book, shows extensive sail damage with two missile tubes obliterated, and the target for recovery was the forward 135-ft section of the sail. The wreck was in two major pieces on the ocean bottom.

=== Patrol deviation ===
According to Craven, K-129 crossed the International Date Line at 40°N, which was much farther south of her expected patrol station:

When K-129 passed longitude 180, it should have been farther north, at a latitude of 45°, or more than 300 miles away. If that was a navigational mistake, it would be an error of historic proportions. Thus, if the sub were not somewhere in the vicinity of where the Soviets supposed it to be, there would be a high probability, if not a certainty, that the submarine was a rogue, off on its own, in grave disobedience of its orders.

Craven does not explain why he eliminated the possibilities that K-129 was proceeding to a newly assigned and officially approved patrol area, or using a new track to an established patrol area, nor why he concluded that K-129 was acting in an abnormal or criminal manner for a Soviet strategic missile submarine. According to an internal intelligence memo directed to Henry A. Kissinger in May 1974, K-129's recovery site is within the 500 nm transit lane used by a Soviet Yankee-class submarine on its initial deployment to the East Pacific.

Craven also noted:

While the Russian submarine was presumed to be at sea, an oceanographic ship of the University of Hawaii was conducting research in the oceanic waters off Hawaii's Leeward Islands. The researchers discovered a large slick on the surface of the ocean, collected a sample, and found that it was highly radioactive. They reported this to George Woolard, the director of the Hawaii Institute of Geophysical Research.

Anatoliy Shtyrov (Анатолий Штыров), a former Soviet Pacific Fleet Deputy Chief of Staff for Intelligence, has said that K-129 would normally patrol an area off the West Coast of the United States, but it was sent on an unscheduled combat patrol in the eastern Pacific only 1½ months after returning from its regularly scheduled patrol. Vladimir Evdasin, who from June 1960 to March 1961 served aboard K-129, reported that K-129 was sent on a secret mission in response to the substantial U.S. naval force build-up off the Korean coast after the Pueblo incident. K-129's mission was in support of North Korea, which was an ally of the Soviet Union, and directed against U.S. naval operations, Pacific bases, and U.S. maritime support lines to Southeast Asia.

== Alternative theories ==
Red Star Rogue by Kenneth Sewell makes the claim that Project Azorian recovered virtually all of K-129 from the ocean floor, and in fact, "Despite an elaborate cover-up and the eventual claim the project had been a failure, most of K-129 and the remains of the crew were, in fact, raised from the bottom of the Pacific and brought into the Glomar Explorer".

In August 1993, Ambassador Malcolm Toon presented to a Russian delegation K-129's ship's bell. According to Red Star Rogue, this bell had been permanently attached to the middle of the conning tower of K-129, thus indicating that in addition to the bow of the submarine, the critical and valuable midsection of the submarine was at least partially recovered by Project Azorian. Additionally, Ambassador Toon is quoted from the 6th Plenum of the U.S.–Russia Joint Commission on POW/MIAs as saying, "Our Director of Naval Intelligence has concluded that no U.S. sub was within 300 nautical miles of your sub when it sank". Red Star Rogue places K-129 at 24°N by 163°W, less than 350 miles from Honolulu. This site is consistent with the discovery of radioactive oil reported to the Hawaii Institute of Geophysical Research at the time.

The premise of Red Star Rogue is that a fail-safe device, designed to be activated in the event of an unauthorized fire command of its nuclear missiles, caused two catastrophic explosions (monitored by U.S. technology at the time), which sank the submarine. Eleven additional crewmen have never been satisfactorily identified, and K-129's crew manifest was listed as missing by Russian authorities. An ID photograph of a sailor found in the wreck has never been identified. Red Star Rogue claims the changing relations with China and Russia in the early 1970s, forged by Nixon and Kissinger, were enabled by the K-129 incident.

Craven suggests that Project Azorian's real goal was not the nuclear weapons or the coding systems at all; rather, the project sought to determine exactly what K-129 was doing at 40°N/180°W "where she did not belong". Such information could be (and supposedly was) used within Henry Kissinger's foreign policy of "Deterrence Through Uncertainty", to "raise an unanswerable question in Leonid Brezhnev's mind about his command and control of his armed forces".

A retired U.S. Navy captain and former naval attaché in Moscow, Peter Huchthausen, said he had a brief conversation in 1987 with Admiral Peter Navojtsev, who told him, "Captain, you are very young and inexperienced, but you will learn that there were some matters that both nations have agreed to not discuss, and one of these is the reasons we lost K-129." In 1995, when Huchthausen began work on a book about the Soviet submarine fleet, he interviewed Russian Navy Rear Admiral Viktor Dygalo, who claimed that the true history of K-129 has not been revealed because of the informal agreement between the two countries' senior naval commands. The purpose of that secrecy, he alleged, is to stop any further research into the losses of USS Scorpion and K-129. Huchthausen reported that Dygalo told him to "overlook this matter, and hope that the time will come when the truth will be told to the families of the victims."

== Legacy ==
The declassified American CIA short film showing the burials of the Soviet sailors at sea with military honors.

In October 1992, Robert Gates, as the Director of Central Intelligence, visited Moscow to meet with President Boris Yeltsin of Russia. He said:

As a gesture of intent, a symbol of a new era, I carried with me the Soviet naval flag that had shrouded the coffins of the half dozen Soviet sailors whose remains the Glomar Explorer had recovered when it raised part of a Soviet ballistic-missile submarine from deep in the Pacific Ocean in the mid-1970s; I also was taking to Yeltsin a videotape of their burial at sea, complete with prayers for the dead and the Soviet national anthem – a dignified and respectful service even at the height of the Cold War.

Gates's decision to bring the videotape of the funeral held for the men on the Golf was ultimately motivated by the fact that the United States wanted to inspire Russia to offer up information on missing American servicemen in Vietnam. Before that, "We had never confirmed anything to the Russians except in various vague senses", he said in an interview.

Shortly after the USSR collapsed, the Bush administration had told the Russians through an intermediary that we couldn't tell them any more about what had happened on Golf/Glomar. But then when we started asking the Russians about what had happened to U.S. pilots shot down over Vietnam, and if any U.S. POWs had been transferred to Russia and held there, they came back and said, "What about our guys in the submarine?" At the time, the administration told the Russians only that there were no survivors and that there were only scattered remains.

A subsequent FOIA search to find if any POWs were released as a result of this visit produced only negative results. According to Peter Huchthausen:

American officers have refuted the Russian charge made early on that American nuclear attack submarine U.S.S. Swordfish was the U.S. submarine involved – a charge based solely on the latter's reported arrival in the Ship Repair Facility, Yokosuka, Japan, on 17 March 1968, with a badly damaged sail. Retired U.S. Navy Admiral William D. Smith informed Dygalo by letter following a 31 August 1994, meeting of a Joint U.S./Russia Commission examining questions of Cold War and previous war missing, that the allegation of Swordfish's involvement was not correct and that Swordfish was nowhere near the Golf on 8 March 1968. The joint commission, headed by General Volkogonov and Ambassador Toon, informed the Russians that no U.S. submarines on 8 March 1968, had been within 300 nautical miles (560 km) of the site where the K-129 was found.

Around the same time, Russian president Boris Yeltsin posthumously awarded the Medal "For Courage" to 98 sailors who died on K-129. However, as the complement of a diesel-electric Golf-class Russian submarine was about 83, his award acknowledges 15 extra personnel aboard the boat at the time of its sinking. An increase in the sub's total complement would put a strain on the logistical capabilities of a patrol because it reduces its duration. No explanation for the K-129's extra submariners has ever been provided by the Russian Navy.

== See also ==
- Phantom (2013 movie), loosely based on the story of K-129.

== Bibliography ==
- Craven, John (2001). "The Hunt for Red September: A Tale of Two Submarines". The Silent War: The Cold War Battle Beneath the Sea. New York: Simon & Schuster. pp. 198–222. ISBN 0-684-87213-7.
- Sontag, Sherry (1998). Blind Man's Bluff: The Untold Story of American Submarine Espionage. New York: Harper. ISBN 0-06-103004-X.
- Sewell, Kenneth (2005). Red Star Rogue: The untold story of a Soviet submarine's nuclear strike attempt on the U.S. New York: Simon & Schuster. ISBN 0-7432-6112-7.
- Polmar, Norman (2004). Cold War Submarines: The Design and Construction of U.S. and Soviet Submarines. Dulles: Potomac Books. ISBN 978-1-57488-594-1.
- Podvig, Pavel (2001). Russian Strategic Nuclear Forces. Cambridge, Massachusetts: MIT Press. ISBN 0-262-16202-4.
- Sharp, David (2012). The CIA's Greatest Covert Operation: Inside the Daring Mission to Recover a Nuclear-Armed Soviet Sub. Lawrence, KS: University Press of Kansas. p. 344. ISBN 978-0-7006-1834-7. Archived from the original on 28 July 2012.
- Dean, Josh (2017). The Taking of K-129 : How the CIA Used Howard Hughes to Steal a Russian Sub in the Most Daring Covert Operation in History. New York, NY: Penguin Publishing Group. p. 448. ISBN 9781101984437.
