= Project Azorian =

1974 CIA project to recover the sunken Soviet submarine K-129

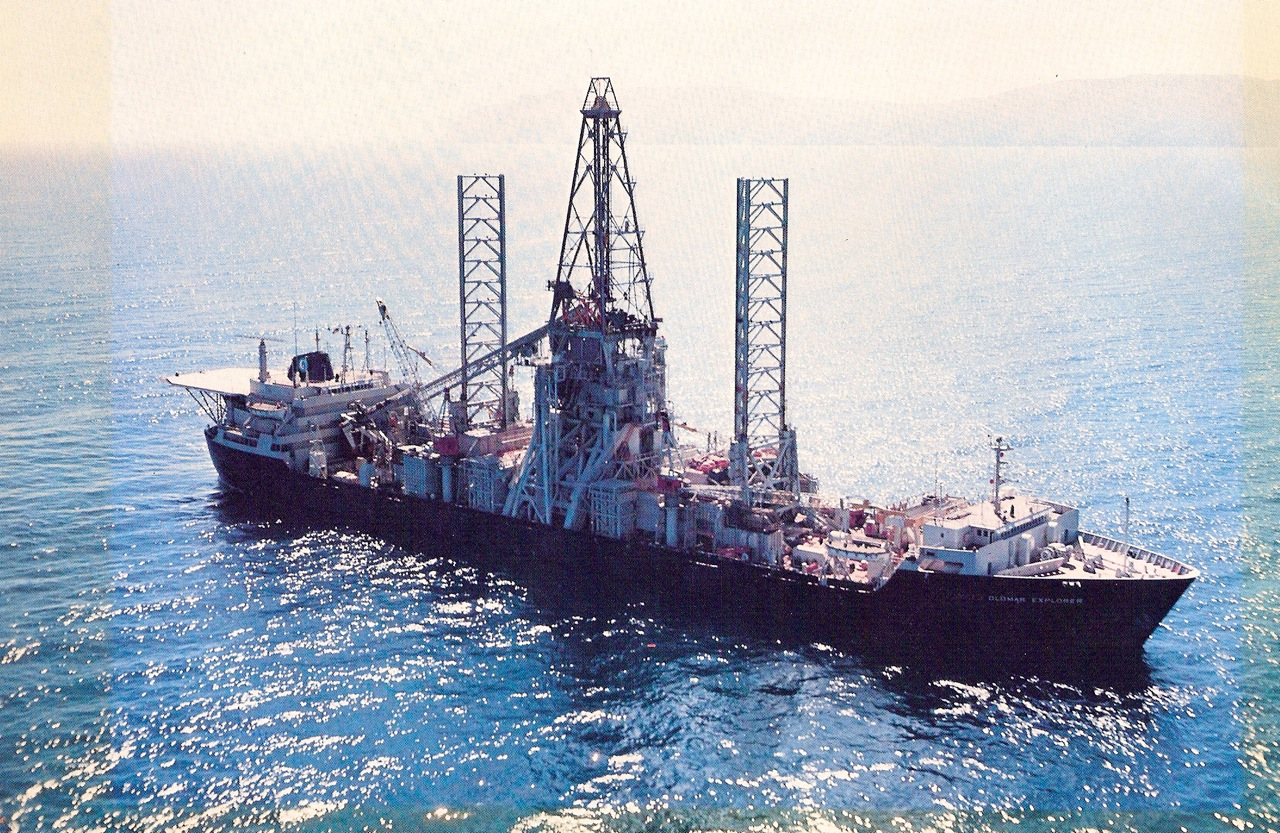
- Hughes Glomar Explorer
- Date: 1974
- Location: 16,500 feet (5,000 m) below the Pacific Ocean
- Participants: CIA, U.S. Navy
- Outcome: Successful recovery of a portion of Soviet submarine K-129

Project Azorian (also called "Jennifer" by the press after its Top Secret Security Compartment) was a U.S. Central Intelligence Agency (CIA) project to recover the sunken Soviet submarine K-129 from the Pacific Ocean floor in 1974 using the purpose-built ship Hughes Glomar Explorer. The 1968 sinking of K-129 occurred about 1,560 miles (2,510 km) northwest of Hawaii. Project Azorian was one of the most complex, expensive, and covert intelligence operations of the Cold War at a cost of about US$800 million (equivalent to $4.1 billion in 2025).

The US designed the recovery ship and its lifting cradle using concepts developed with Global Marine (see Project Mohole) that used their precision stability equipment to keep the ship nearly stationary above the target while lowering nearly three miles (4.8 km) of pipe. They worked with scientists to develop methods for preserving paper that had been underwater for years in hopes of being able to recover and read the submarine's codebooks. The reasons that this project was undertaken included the recovery of an intact R-21 nuclear missile and cryptological documents and equipment.

The Soviet Union was unable to locate K-129, but the US determined its general location from data recorded by four Air Force Technical Applications Center (AFTAC) sites and the Adak Sound Surveillance System (SOSUS) array. The US identified an acoustic event on March 8 that likely originated from an explosion aboard the submarine, and was able to determine the location to within five nautical miles (5.8 mi; 9.3 km).

The submarine USS Halibut located the boat using the Fish, a towed, 12-foot (3.7 m), two-short-ton (1.8 t) collection of cameras, strobe lights, and sonar that was built to withstand extreme depths. The recovery operation in international waters about six years later used mining for manganese nodules as its cover story.

The mining company and ship were nominally owned by reclusive billionaire Howard Hughes, but secretly backed by the CIA, who paid for the construction of the Hughes Glomar Explorer. The ship recovered a portion of K-129, but a mechanical failure in the grapple caused two-thirds of the recovered section to break off during recovery.

== Wreck of K-129 ==
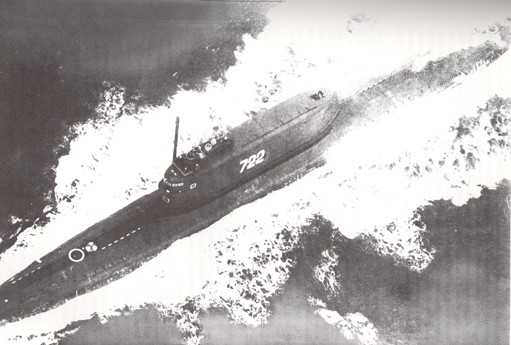
The K-129 submarine

On February 24, 1968, K-129, a Soviet Project 629A ballistic missile submarine attached to the 15th Submarine Squadron of the Soviet Pacific Fleet, left Rybachiy Naval Base in Kamchatka on a routine missile patrol, the boat's third since completing a major modernization the previous year. On the first day, the sub cruised out to deep water, conducted a test dive, surfaced to radio in, and embarked for its patrol station. The sub was to make standard radio contact with its commanders in Kamchatka when crossing the 180th meridian and when arriving on station. But K-129 missed its designated check-ins and did not respond to communication attempts. By the third week of March, the submarine was declared missing.

In April 1968 many Soviet Pacific Fleet surface and air assets deployed to the North Pacific Ocean were observed performing unusual search operations. The activity was evaluated by the United States Office of Naval Intelligence (ONI) as a possible reaction to the loss of a Soviet submarine. Soviet surface ship searches were centered on a location known to be associated with Soviet Golf II-class strategic ballistic missile (SSB) diesel submarine patrol routes. These submarines carried three nuclear missiles in an extended sail/conning tower and were routinely deployed within missile range of the US west coast. After weeks of searching, the Soviets were unable to locate the sunken boat, and Soviet Pacific Fleet operations gradually returned to normal.

The US Navy analyzed acoustic data recorded by the SOSUS hydrophone network in the northern Pacific—four AFTAC sites and the Adak, Alaska SOSUS array—and found evidence of the implosion that had sunk the Russian sub. Naval Facility (NAVFAC) Point Sur, south of Monterey, California, isolated a sonic signature on its low-frequency array recordings of an implosion that had occurred on March 8, 1968. Using NavFac Point Sur's date and time of the event, NavFac Adak and the US West Coast NAVFAC were also able to isolate the acoustic event. With five SOSUS lines-of-bearing, Naval Intelligence was able to localize the site of the K-129 wreck to the vicinity of 40.1° N latitude and 179.9° E longitude (close to the International Date Line).

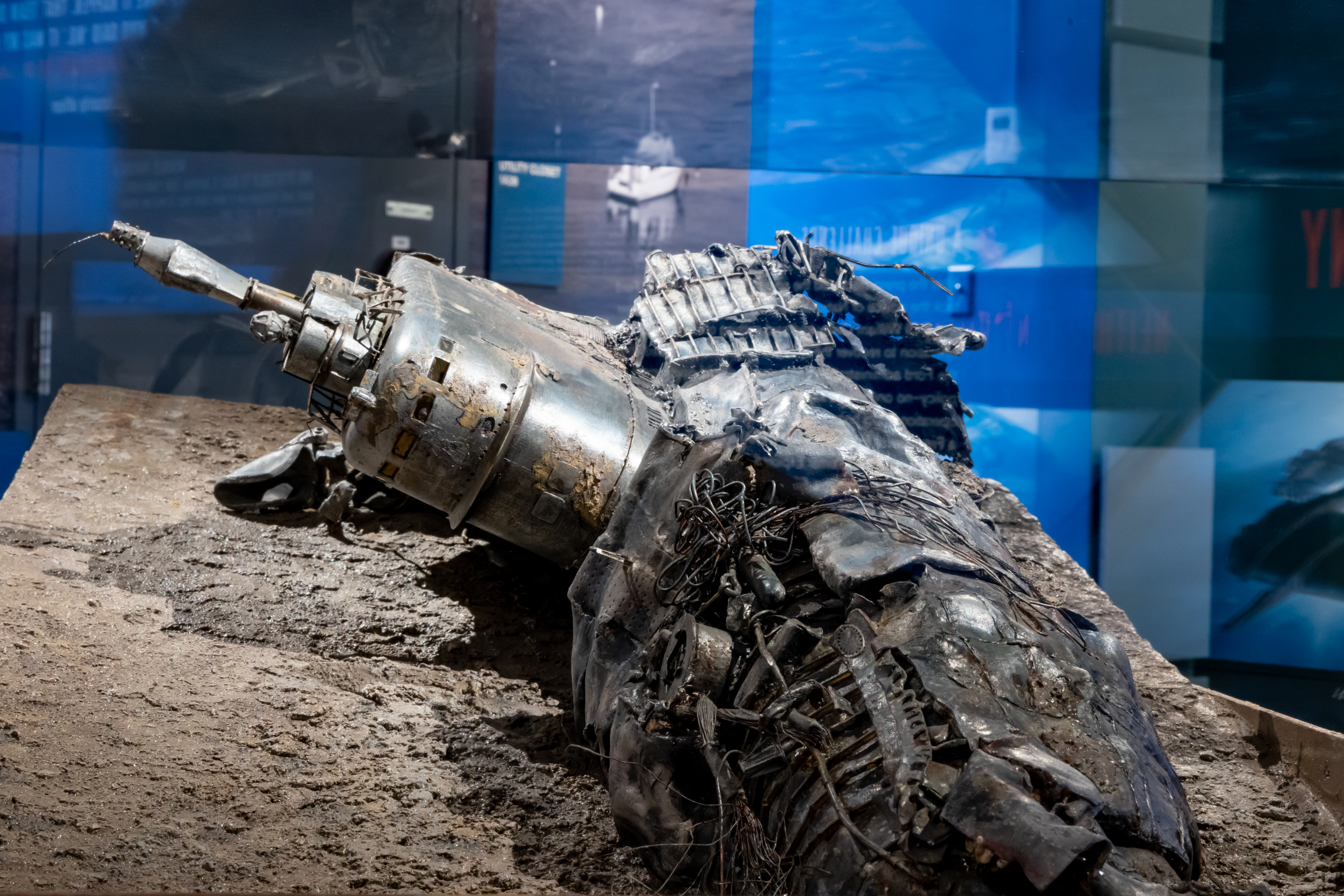
The model of the sunken and deteriorated K-129 submarine

In July 1968, the United States Navy began "Operation Sand Dollar" with the deployment of USS Halibut from Pearl Harbor to the wreck site. Sand Dollar's objective was to find and photograph K-129. In 1968 Halibut, which had been configured to use deep submergence search equipment, was the US Navy's only such specially-equipped submarine. Halibut located the wreck after three weeks of visual search using robotic remote-controlled cameras. (It took almost five months of search to find the wreck of the US nuclear-powered submarine Scorpion in the Atlantic, also in 1968). Halibut is reported to have spent the next several weeks taking more than 20,000 closeup photos of every aspect of the K-129 wreck, a feat for which Halibut received a special classified Presidential Unit Citation signed by Lyndon B. Johnson in 1968.

The photos were sent to the National Photographic Interpretation Center at the CIA to determine what, if anything, could be determined about the status of the wreck. CIA analysts wrote a report indicating that there was a good probability that the nuclear missile in the #3 missile tube was still intact.

In 1970, based upon this photography, Defense Secretary Melvin Laird and Henry Kissinger, then National Security Advisor, proposed a clandestine plan to recover the wreckage so that the US could study Soviet nuclear missile technology, as well as possibly recover cryptographic materials. The proposal was accepted by President Richard Nixon, and the CIA was tasked to attempt the recovery.

== Building Glomar Explorer and its cover story ==
Global Marine Development Inc., the research and development arm of Global Marine Inc., a pioneer in deepwater offshore drilling operations, was contracted to design, build and operate Hughes Glomar Explorer to secretly salvage the sunken Soviet submarine. The ship was built at the Sun Shipbuilding yard near Philadelphia. Billionaire businessman Howard Hughes – whose companies were already contractors on numerous classified US military weapons, aircraft and satellite contracts – agreed to lend his name to the project to support the cover story that the ship was mining manganese nodules from the ocean floor, but Hughes and his companies had no actual involvement in the project. K-129 was photographed at a depth of over 16,000 feet (4,900 m), and thus the salvage operation would be well beyond the depth of any ship salvage operation ever attempted. On November 1, 1972, work began on the 63,000-short-ton (57,000 t), 619-foot-long (189 m) Hughes Glomar Explorer (HGE).

At least two preparatory missions were carried out in the general area of the recovery site using other ships. From September 1970 to January 1971, the drilling ship GLOMAR II collected site data as part of Project AXMINSTER. From January to July 1972, the R.V. SEASCOPE surveyed the general area to within 45 nautical miles of the recovery site. Both missions also probed the Soviet reactions to research ships in the region.

The primary objective was to recover a major portion of the submarine. In particular, the United States Intelligence Board (USIB) expected to recover cryptographic equipment, a nuclear warhead, a SS-N-5 missile, the navigation system, fire control system, sonar system, ASW countermeasures, and related documentation.

== Recovery ==
Hughes Glomar Explorer employed a large mechanical claw, which Lockheed officially titled the "Capture Vehicle" but affectionately called Clementine. The capture vehicle was designed to be lowered to the ocean floor, grasp the targeted submarine section, and then lift that section into the ship's moon pool for processing. One requirement of this technology was to keep the floating base stable and in position over a fixed point 16,000 feet (4,900 m) below the ocean surface.

The capture vehicle was lowered and raised on a pipe string similar to those used on oil drilling rigs. Section by section, pairs of 30-foot (9.1 m) steel pipes were strung together to lower the claw through a hole in the middle of the ship. This configuration was designed by Western Gear Corp. of Everett, Washington. Upon a successful capture by the claw, the lift reversed the process: 60-foot (18 m) pairs drawn up and removed one at a time. The salvaged "Target Object" was thus to be drawn into the moon pool in the center of the vessel, the doors of which could then be closed to form a floor for the salvaged section. This allowed for the entire salvage process to take place underwater, away from the view of other ships, aircraft, or spy satellites.

Hughes Glomar Explorer arrived at the recovery site (40.1°N 179.9°E) on July 4, 1974, after departing from Long Beach, California, on June 20, and sailing 3,008 nautical miles (5,571 km). The ship conducted salvage operations for over a month. During this period, at least two Soviet Navy ships visited Hughes Glomar Explorer's work site, the oceangoing tugboat SB-10, and the Soviet missile range instrumentation ship Chazma. It was found out after 1991 that the Soviets were tipped off about the operation and were aware that the CIA was planning some kind of salvage operation, but the military command believed it impossible that they could perform such a task and disregarded further intelligence warnings. Later, Soviet Ambassador Anatoly Dobrynin started sending urgent messages back to the Soviet Navy warning that an operation was imminent. Soviet military engineering experts reevaluated their positions and claimed that it was indeed possible (though highly unlikely) to recover K-129, and ships in the area were ordered to report any unusual activity, although the lack of knowledge as to where K-129 was located impeded their ability to stop any salvage operation.

US Army Major General Roland Lajoie stated that, according to a briefing he received by the CIA during recovery operations, Clementine suffered a catastrophic failure, causing two-thirds of the already raised portion of K-129 to sink back to the ocean floor. Former Lockheed and Hughes Global Marine employees who worked on the operation have stated that several of the "claws" intended to grab the submarine fractured, possibly because they were manufactured from maraging steel, which is very strong, but not very ductile compared with other kinds of steel. Video evidence and eyewitness reports have stated that multiple claws of Clementine sheared off, causing a 100-foot (30 m) section of the submarine to fall back to the seafloor. Eyewitnesses have stated that only the 38-foot (12 m) bow section was raised, while the sail portion containing the nuclear missiles was lost during the raising operation.

CIA footage presented to Russia in 1992, showing the burial at sea of the bodies recovered from K-129

The recovered section included two nuclear torpedoes, and thus Project Azorian was not a complete failure. The bodies of six crewmen were also recovered, and were given a memorial service and with military honors, buried at sea in a metal casket because of radioactivity concerns. Other crew members have reported that code books and other materials of apparent interest to CIA employees aboard the vessel were recovered, and images of inventory printouts exhibited in the documentary suggest that various submarine components, such as hatch covers, instruments and sonar equipment were also recovered. White's documentary also states that the ship's bell from K-129 was recovered, and was subsequently returned to the Soviet Union as part of a diplomatic effort. The CIA considered the project one of the greatest intelligence coups of the Cold War.

The entire salvage operation was recorded by a CIA documentary film crew, but this film remains classified. A short portion of the film, showing the recovery and subsequent burial at sea of the six bodies recovered in the forward section of K-129, was given to the Russian government in 1992.

== Public disclosure ==
=== The New York Times story ===
Time Magazine credited Jack Anderson as breaking the story in a March 1975 radio broadcast. Rejecting a plea from the Director of Central Intelligence William Colby to suppress the story, Anderson said he released the story because "Navy experts have told us that the sunken sub contains no real secrets and that the project, therefore, is a waste of the taxpayers' money."

In February 1975, investigative reporter and former New York Times writer Seymour Hersh had planned to publish a story on Project Azorian. Bill Kovach, the New York Times Washington bureau chief at the time, said in 2005 that the government offered a convincing argument to delay publication – exposure at that time, while the project was ongoing, "would have caused an international incident." The New York Times published its account in March 1975, after a story appeared in the Los Angeles Times, and included a five-paragraph explanation of the many twists and turns in the path to publication. CIA director George H. W. Bush reported on several occasions to U.S. president Gerald Ford on media reports and the future use of the ship. The CIA concluded that it seemed unclear what, if any, action was taken by the Soviet Union after learning of the story.

=== FOIA request and the Glomar response ===
After stories had been published about the CIA's attempts to stop publication of information about Project Azorian, Harriet Ann Phillippi, a journalist, filed a Freedom of Information Act (FOIA) request with the CIA for any records about the CIA's attempts. The CIA refused to either confirm or deny the existence of such documents. This type of non-responsive reply has since come to be known as the "Glomar response" or "Glomarization".

=== 1998 release of video ===
A video showing the 1974 memorial services for the six Soviet seamen whose bodies were recovered by Project Azorian was forwarded by the U.S. to Russia in the early 1990s. Portions of this video were shown on television documentaries concerning Project Azorian, including a 1998 Discovery Channel special called A Matter of National Security (based on Clyde W. Burleson's book, The Jennifer Project (1977)) and again in 1999, on a PBS Cold War submarine episode of NOVA.

=== 2010 release of 1985 CIA article ===
In February 2010, the CIA released an article from the fall 1985 edition of the CIA internal journal Studies in Intelligence following an application by researcher Matthew Aid at the National Security Archive to declassify the information under the Freedom of Information Act. Exactly what the operation managed to salvage remained unclear. The report was written by an unidentified participant in Project Azorian.

=== 2010 release of President Ford cabinet meeting ===
President Gerald Ford, Secretary of Defense James R. Schlesinger, Philip W. Buchen (Counsel to the President), John O. Marsh, Jr. (Counselor to the President), White House Chief of Staff Donald Rumsfeld, USAF Lieutenant General Brent Scowcroft (Deputy Assistant to the President for National Security Affairs), and William Colby (Director of Central Intelligence), discussed the leak and whether the Ford administration would react to Hersh's story in a cabinet meeting on March 19, 1975, the same day that The New York Times published the story. Secretary of Defense Schlesinger is quoted as saying,

This episode has been a major American accomplishment. The operation is a marvel – technically, and with maintaining secrecy.

Schlesinger indicated at least some form of success that should be confirmed publicly. CIA Director William Colby dissented, recalling the U-2 crisis, saying:

I think we should not put the Soviet Union under such pressure to respond.

The Los Angeles Times published a four-page story the next day by Jack Nelson with the headline "Administration Won't Talk About Sub Raised by CIA."

== Conspiracy theory ==
Time magazine and a court filing by Felice D. Cohen and Morton H. Halperin on behalf of the Military Audit Project suggest that the alleged project goal of raising a Soviet submarine might itself have been a cover story for another secret mission. Tapping undersea communication cables, the cover up of an assassination, the installation of a missile silo, and installation and repair of surveillance systems to monitor ship and submarine movements are listed as possibilities for the actual purpose of such a secret mission.

== Eyewitness accounts ==
W. Craig Reed told an inside account of Project Azorian in his book Red November: Inside the Secret U.S. – Soviet Submarine War (2010). The account was provided by Joe Houston, the senior engineer who designed leading-edge camera systems used by the Hughes Glomar Explorer team to photograph K-129 on the ocean floor. The team needed pictures that offered precise measurements to design the grappling arm and other systems used to bring the sunken submarine up from the bottom. Houston worked for the mysterious "Mr. P" (John Parangosky) who worked for CIA Deputy Director Carl E. Duckett, the two leaders of Project Azorian. Duckett later worked with Houston at another company, and intimated that the CIA may have recovered much more from the K-129 than admitted publicly. Reed also details how the deep submergence towed sonar array technology was used for subsequent Operation Ivy Bells missions to wiretap underwater Soviet communications cables.

The documentary film Azorian: The Raising Of The K-129 features interviews with Sherman Wetmore, Global Marine heavy lift operations manager; Charlie Johnson, Global Marine heavy lift engineer; and Raymond Feldman, Lockheed Ocean Systems senior staff engineer. They were the three principals in the design of the Hughes Glomar Explorer heavy lift system and the Lockheed capture vehicle (CV or claw). They were also on board the ship during the mission and were intimately involved with the recovery operation. They confirmed that only 38 ft (12 m) of the bow was eventually recovered. The intent was to recover the forward two thirds (138 ft [42 m]) of K-129, which had broken off from the rear section of the submarine and was designated the Target Object (TO). The capture vehicle successfully lifted the TO from the ocean floor, but a failure of part of the capture vehicle on the way up caused the loss of 100 ft (30 m) of the TO, including the sail. Norman Polmar and Michael White published Project Azorian: The CIA And The Raising of the K-129 in 2010. The book contains additional documentary evidence about the effort to locate the submarine and the recovery operation.

== CIA Museum artifacts ==
A number of artifacts from Project Azorian and Glomar Explorer are on display at the CIA Museum. The museum has shared declassified images and video featuring the artifacts through its website; however the physical grounds of the museum are on the compound of the George Bush Center for Intelligence and thus physically inaccessible to the public.

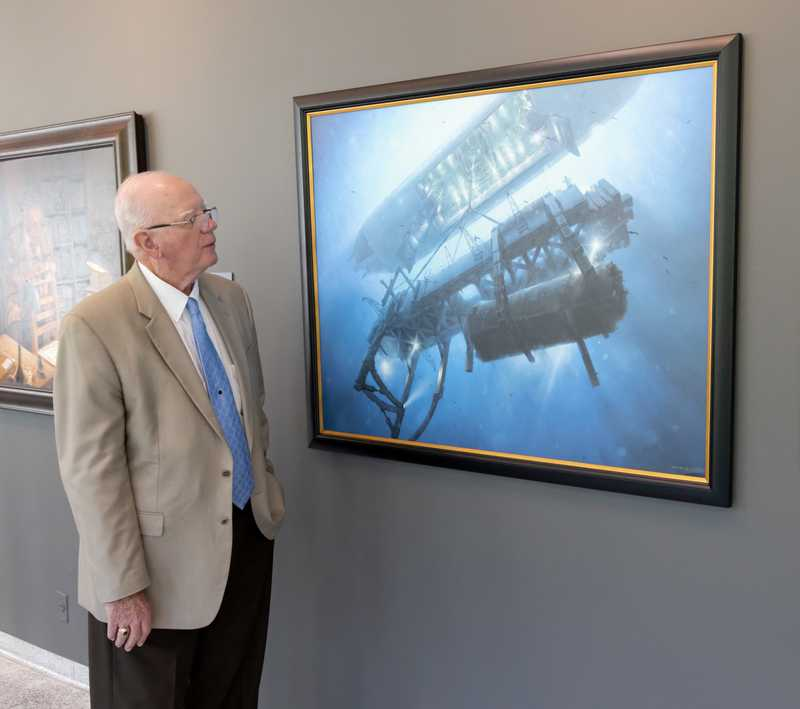
Sherman Wetmore, lead engineer on the Glomar Explorer, looking at an oil painting of the ship raising the Soviet submarine.

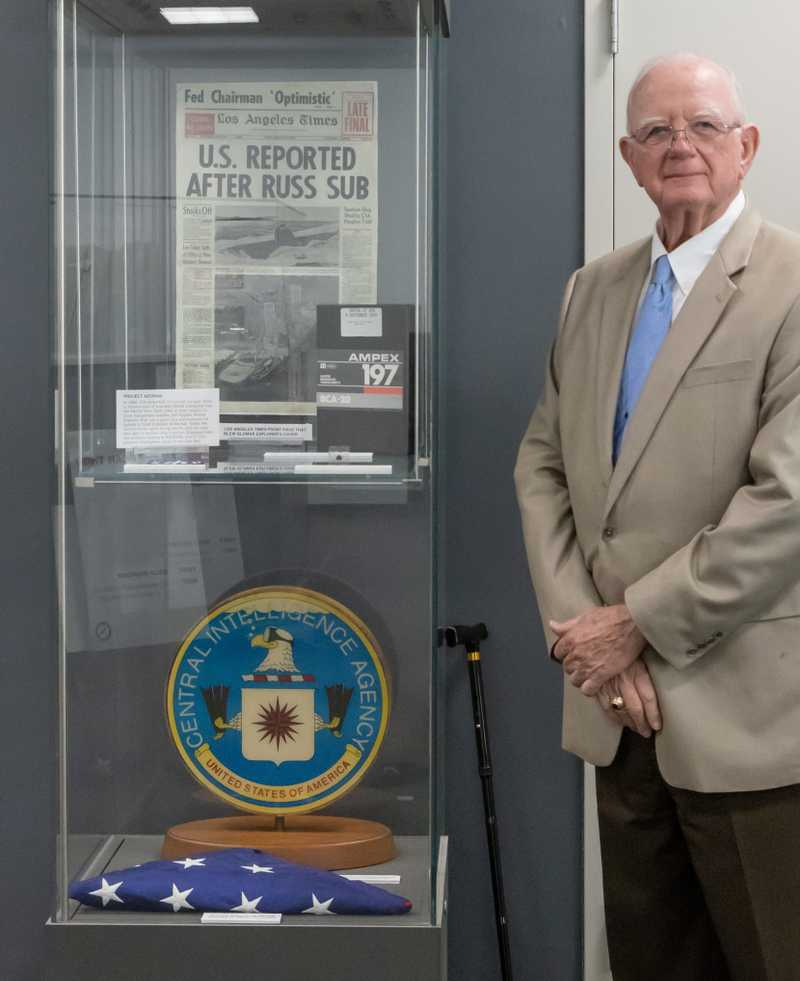
Sherman Wetmore poses next to a collection of Project Azorian artifacts on display.

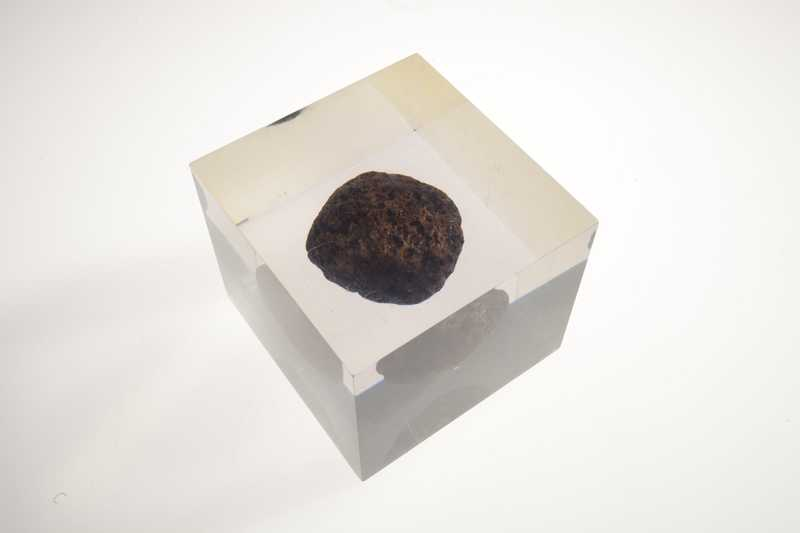
One of the manganese nodules that Glomar recovered from the Pacific, now encased in lucite.

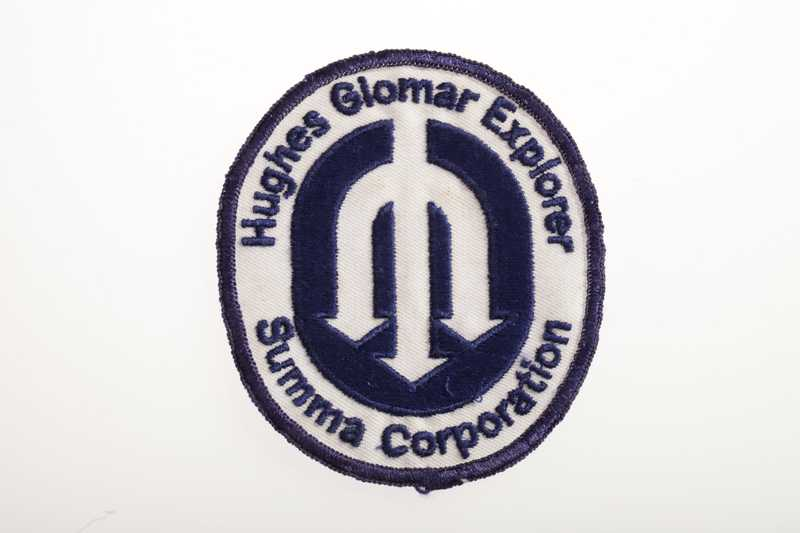
Hughes Glomar / Summa Corporation crew patch

A video discussing the Glomar Explorer, produced as part of the CIA Debrief series on YouTube

== Documentaries ==
The documentary film Azorian: The Raising Of The K-129 was produced by Michael White and released in 2009.

Spy Ops: Project Azorian (Season 1, Episode 8) is a short documentary also produced by Michael White which adds some details to his earlier work. Two former CIA officials (Robert Wallace, John Cardwell) make their appearance in this film for Netflix.

Neither Confirm Nor Deny is a documentary on Project Azorian.

== See also ==
- HMS L55, a British submarine sunk in 1919 and raised by the Soviets in 1928
- HMS Poseidon, a British submarine sunk in 1931 and secretly raised by China in 1972
- Hughes Mining Barge, a submersible barge designed to keep the Glomar Explorer's true nature secret
- The Jennifer Morgue novel by Charles Stross, uses the K-129 scenario as a basis for supernatural horror.
- Three Miles Down novel by Harry Turtledove, based on Project Azorian.
- List of sunken nuclear submarines
