= Golf-class submarine =

Diesel electric ballistic missile submarine class

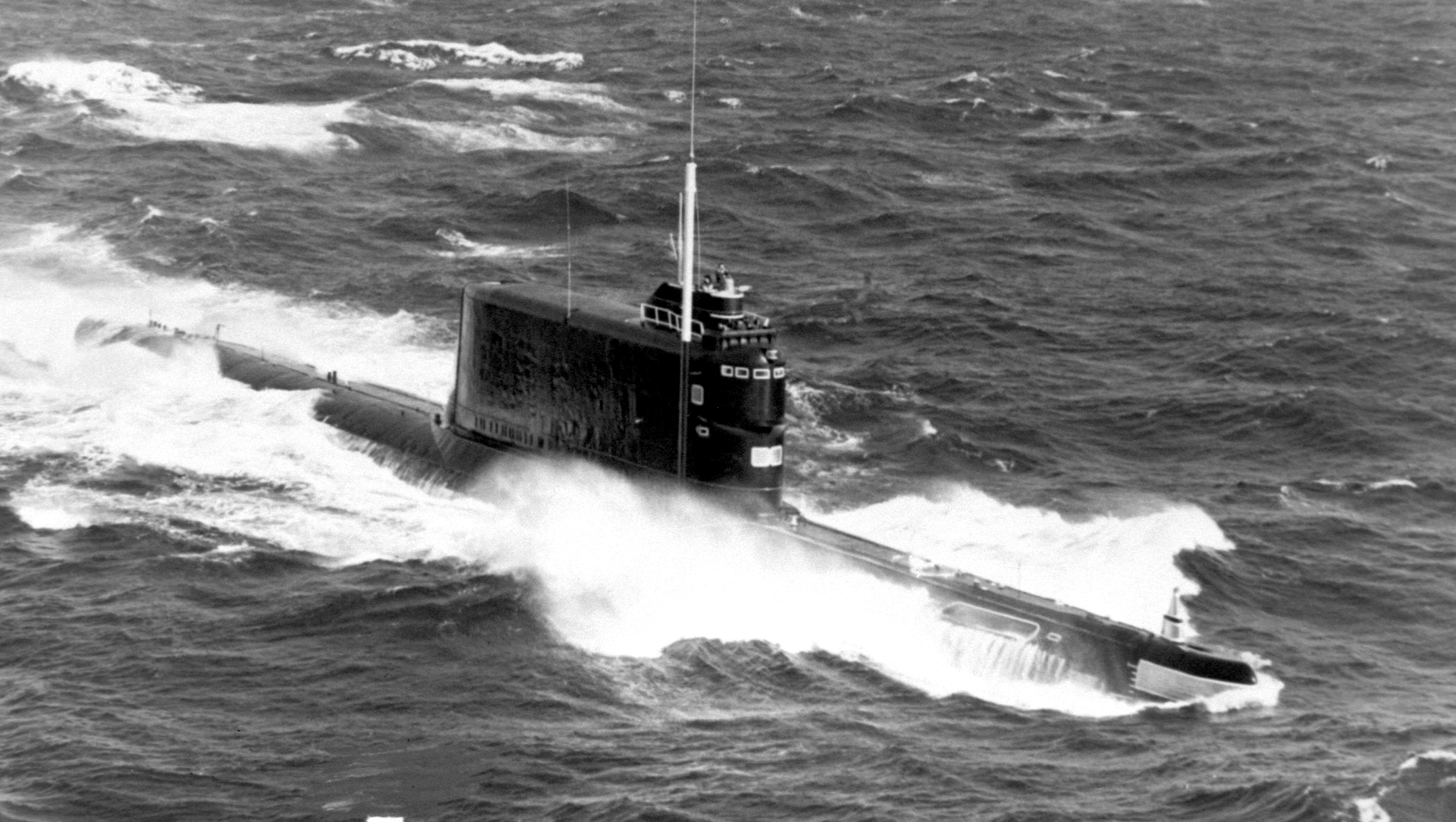
- Project 629A submarine

Class overview
- Name: 629
- Operators: Soviet Navy; People's Liberation Army Navy
- Preceded by: AV 611
- Succeeded by: 658 (Soviet Union) Type 092 (China)
- In service: 1958–1990
- Completed: 23
- Lost: 1

General characteristics
- Displacement: 2,794 tons surfaced/3,553 tons submerged (629); 2,300–2,820 tons surfaced/2,700–3,553 tons submerged (629A)
- Length: 98.4 m (323 ft) (629); 98.9 m (629A)
- Beam: 8.2 m (27 ft)
- Draught: 7.85 m (25.8 ft) (629); 8.5 m (629A)
- Propulsion: 3 × diesel engines, each 2,000 bhp (1,500 kW); 3 × electric motors, 5,200 shp (3,880 kW); 3 shafts
- Speed: surface - 17 kn (31 km/h; 20 mph), 9,500 nmi (17,600 km; 10,900 miles)/5 kn (9.3 km/h; 5.8 mph); submerged - 12 kn (22 km/h; 14 mph)
- Range: 70 days endurance
- Test depth: 260 m (design); 300 m (maximum)
- Complement: 80 (629); 83 (629A)
- Armament: 3 × missile tubes; 3 × Project 629 boats D-1 launch system with R-11FM missiles; Remaining boats D-2 launch system with R-13 missiles; 1966 onwards 629A upgrade D-4 launch system with R-21 missiles; 6 × 533 mm torpedo tubes

The Soviet Navy's Project 629 (Russian: проект–629, proyekt-629) (NATO reporting name: Golf) was a class of diesel-electric ballistic missile submarines. All boats of this class left Soviet service by 1990, and have since been disposed of. According to some sources, at least one Golf-class submarine was operated by China, to test new submarine-launched ballistic missiles (SLBMs).

== Class history ==
Project 629 was started in the mid-1950s along with the D-2 missile launch system, which it was to carry, and was based on the Foxtrot-class submarine. The design task was assigned to OKB-16, one of the two predecessors (the other being SKB-143) of the Malakhit Marine Engineering Bureau, which would eventually become one of the three Soviet/Russian submarine design centers, along with the Rubin Design Bureau and the Lazurit Central Design Bureau. The submarine was originally designed to carry three R-11FM ballistic missiles with a range around 150 km. These were carried in three silos fitted in the rear of the large sail behind the bridge. They could only be fired with the submarine surfaced and the missile raised above the sail, but the submarine could be underway at the time. Only the first three boats were equipped with these; the remaining ones were equipped with the longer-range R-13 missiles.

The first boats were commissioned in 1958 and the last in 1962.

The boats were built at two shipyards — 16 in Severodvinsk and 7 in Komsomolsk-na-Amure in the Far East. An eighth in the Far East went to China. Fourteen were extensively modified in 1966–1972 and became known as 629A by the Soviet Navy and "Golf II" by NATO (the original version having been designated "Golf I"). The major changes were the upgrade of the missile system to carry R-21 missiles, which could be launched from inside their tubes with the submarine submerged, and increased speed. In later years, a few were converted to test new missiles and others had different conversions.

All boats had left Soviet service by 1990. In 1993, 10 were sold to North Korea for scrap. According to some sources, the North Koreans were attempting to get these boats back into service.

An organization of defectors from North Korea, named In-Kook Yantai, published a report in 2016 entitled "North Korea's Nuclear and WMD Assessment". In that report, North Korean defector Kim Heung-kwang said a 3,500-ton, nuclear-powered submarine, one of a pair, was due for launch before 2018. It was described as having four missile launch silos in the sail, and is generally thought to refer to a repowered Golf II-class vessel.

In 1959, the project technology was sold to China, which built a single modified example in 1966, which is still in service.

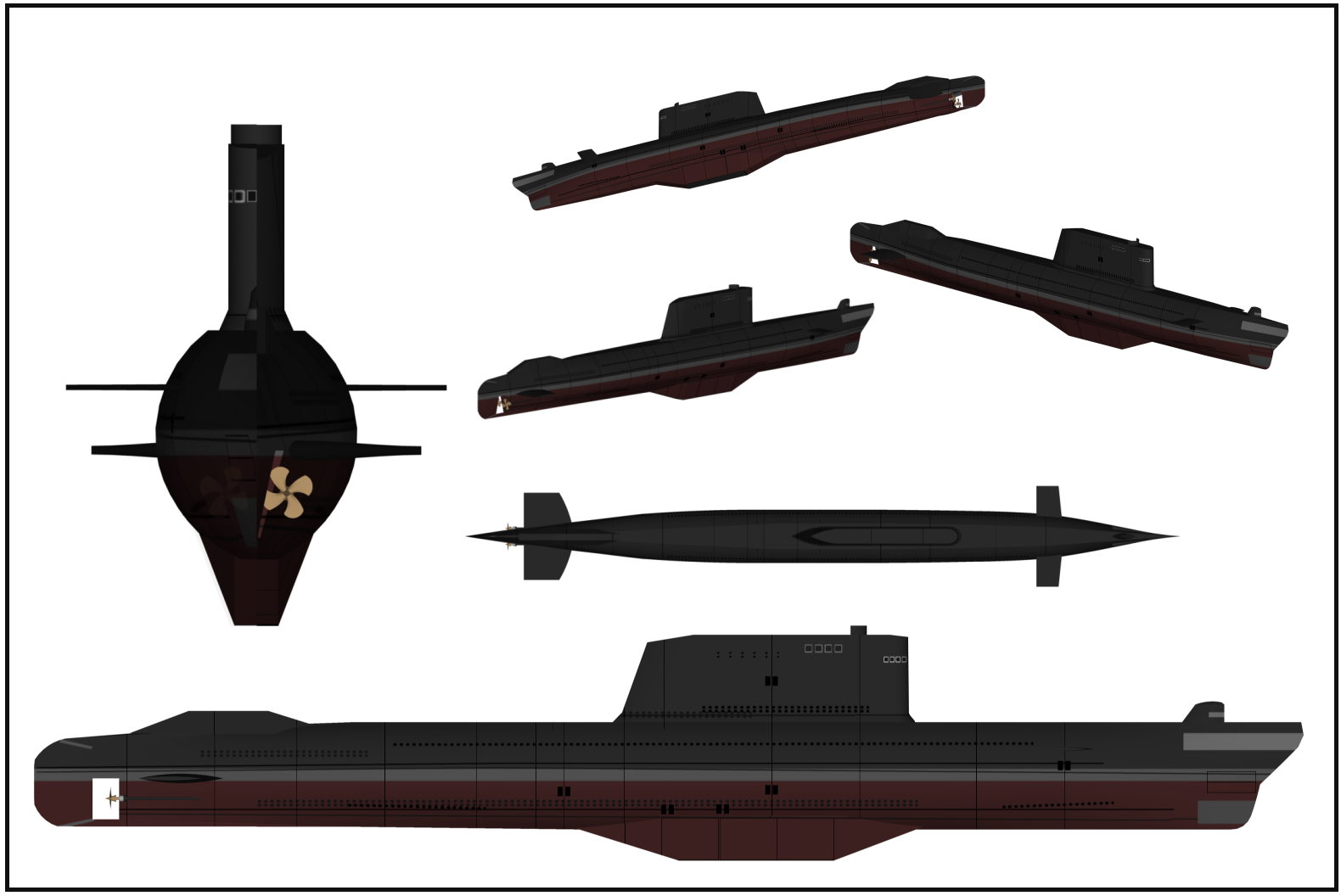
Several views of a Project 629A (Golf II) ballistic missile submarine

== Project Azorian ==
On March 8, 1968, 1,560 nautical miles (2,890 km) northwest of Oahu in the Pacific Ocean, the Golf II-class submarine K-129 sank due to an explosion brought on by unknown cause, the accident being registered by the SOSUS network. The entire crew of 98 was lost and the vessel sank with three ballistic nuclear missiles as well as two nuclear torpedoes. The United States recovered parts of the submarine in July 1974 from a depth around 5 km, in an operation named Project Azorian.

After Halibut discovered a sunken Soviet submarine containing at least one intact ballistic missile complete with nuclear warhead, Melvin Laird, United States Secretary of Defense under President Richard Nixon, approved Azorian. Six years later, 1560 nautical miles north of the Pearl Harbor, a mechanical claw descended 17,000 feet (5,200 m) to the bottom of the Pacific, and guided by computers on board the Glomar Explorer, clamped onto the mass of twisted, rusting steel and began slowly raising it to the surface. How successful the effort was is unclear, but the United States has admitted to recovering a portion of K-129, which included six bodies of Soviet sailors who were buried at sea with full honors.

== Variants ==
- Project 629: The original design with the NATO reporting name Golf I, with a total of 22 boats built from 1958 through 1962. Dimensions are 98.4 m for length, 8.2 m for beam, and 7.85 m for draft. Surfaced/submerged displacements are 2794 / 3553 tons, respectively. Surfaced/submerged speeds are 15 / 12.5 knot, respectively. Project 629 is crewed by 80 men, and is equipped by either D-1 launching system for R-11FM or D-2 launching systems for SS-N-4 SLBMs.
- Project 629B: K-229 was converted in 1958 in Severodvinsk, under Project 629B to test a newly designed on-board missile control system, which was the first-generation design based entirely on semiconductors.
- Project 629A: 14 Project 629/Golf I-class submarines were converted to Project 629A between 1966 and 1972, and received the NATO reporting name "Golf II". Changes include the increase of dimension, with length and draft increased to 98.9 / 8.5 m, respectively, the surfaced/submerged displacement increased to 2300–2820 / 2700–3553 t, respectively, and surfaced/submerged speeds increased to 17 / 14 kn respectively. Crew was increased to 83, and the launching system is D-4 for SS-N-5 SLBMs.
- Project 601: K-118 was converted from 1969 through 1974 and received the NATO reporting name "Golf III", with displacement increased to 4000 tons and number of SLBMs increased to six, and the missile type is SS-N-8.
- Project 605: K-102 was converted from 1969 through 1973 and received the NATO reporting name "Golf IV", lengthened 18.3 m with four SLBMs to test R-27K (SS-N-13) SLBMs.
- Project 619: K-153 was converted in 1976 to test SS-N-20 SLBMs and received the NATO reporting name "Golf V".
- Project 629R: K-61, B-42 and K-107 were converted in Vladivostok into command posts between 1973 and 1979, with the missile and torpedo tubes removed; they received the NATO reporting name "Golf SSQ".
- Type 6631: A Chinese-built Golf-class submarine, she was built in Dalian between 1960 and 1966, after receiving technical data from the USSR in 1959. China did not purchase SLBMs, thus Type 6631 was equipped with simulation systems and mainly used for training. Originally with pennant number 1101, it was subsequently changed to 200 in 1967. The second unit was supposed to be built and delivered by USSR (pennant number K-208), but due to the Sino-Soviet split, most on-board equipment was not delivered, and the boat was used as sample for reverse engineering to complete the first unit, which entered Chinese service in August 1966. In June 1968, Type 6631 went through a major refit because China decided to adopt solid-fueled SLBMs instead of liquid-fueled SLBMs, as the Soviets used, so the simulation equipment was replaced by support equipment of solid-fueled SLBMs. In addition, the planned Chinese SLBM had different dimensions from the original Russian SLBM-equipped Golf-class submarines, so the number of missile tubes was reduced to two from the original three.
- Type 031: Type 6631 went through a second major refit, which was completed in November 1978. The most important improvement is the ability to launch SLBMs under water. In addition to changing to Type 031 from the original Type 6631, the unit also received the name Great Wall, when China began restore the practice of naming its warships in the 1980s. The unit is hence usually referred as Great Wall 200.
