= Glomar Explorer =

Deep-sea drillship platform used by the CIA to recover sunken Soviet submarine

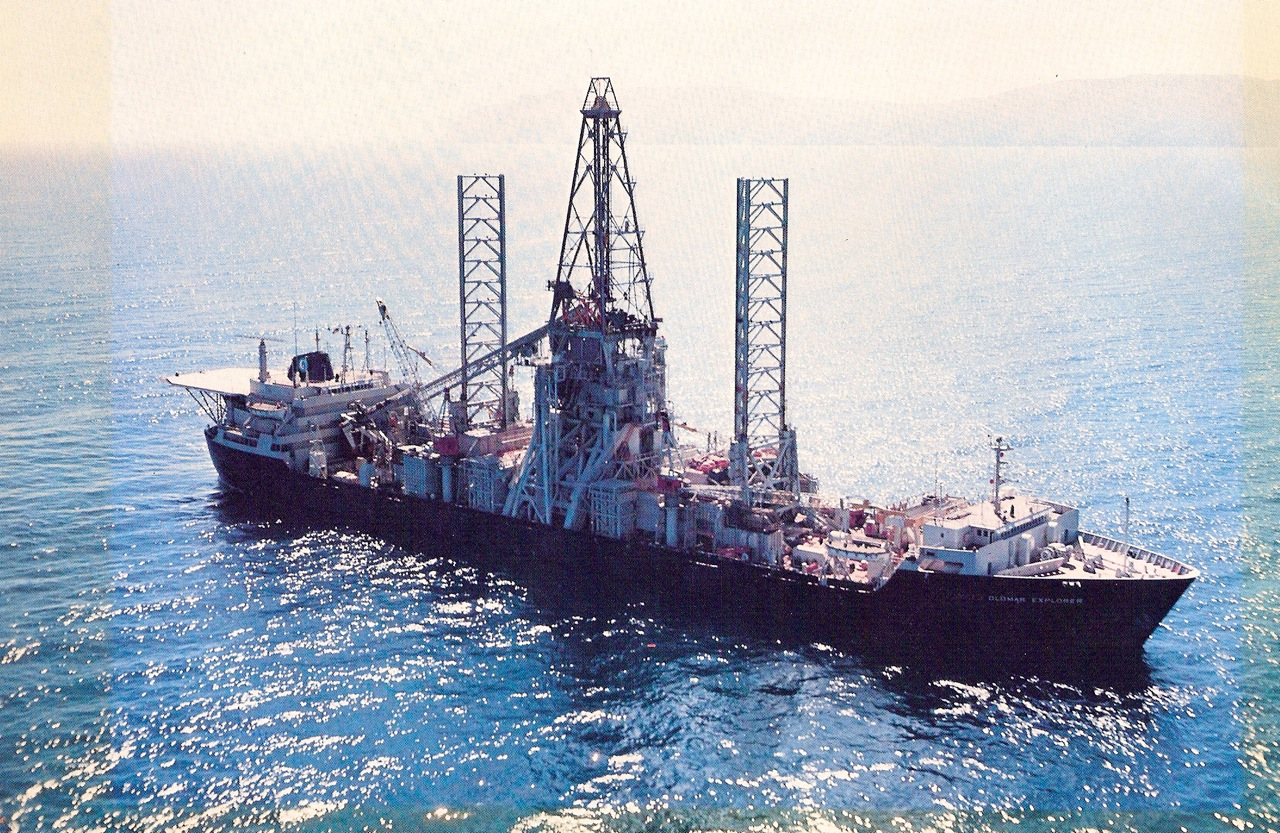

History
- Name: GSF Explorer
- Owner: Global Marine Development
- Port of registry: Port Vila, Vanuatu
- Acquired: 2010
- Identification: ABS class no: 7310452; Call sign: YJQQ3; DNV ID:29748; IMO number: 7233292; MMSI no.:576830000
- Fate: Scrapped, 2015

United States
- Name: Hughes Glomar Explorer
- Namesake: Howard Hughes
- Owner: Global Marine
- Operator: Global Marine for the Central Intelligence Agency
- Builder: Sun Shipbuilding & Drydock Company; Chester, Pennsylvania
- Cost: >$350 million (1974) (>$1.73 billion in 2024 dollars.)
- Laid down: 1971
- Launched: 4 November 1972
- Completed: 1974
- Maiden voyage: 21 June 1974
- Renamed: USNS Glomar Explorer (T-AG-193), 1976 to 1997
- Fate: Mothballed in Suisun Bay, California until repurposed
- Renamed: Converted to commercial use as the Global Marine Glomar Explorer 1998 to 2013
- Renamed: After acquisition by Transocean, it was the GSF Explorer, after 2013

General characteristics
- Type: Drillship
- Displacement: 50,500 long tons (51,310 t) light
- Length: 619 ft (189 m)
- Beam: 116 ft (35 m)
- Draft: 38 ft (12 m)
- Propulsion: Diesel-electric; 5 × Nordberg 16-cylinder diesel engines driving 4,160 V AC generators turning 6 × 2,200 hp (1.6 MW) DC shaft motors, twin shafts
- Speed: 10 knots (19 km/h; 12 mph)
- Complement: 160

GSF Explorer, formerly USNS Hughes Glomar Explorer (T-AG-193), was a deep-sea drillship platform built for Project Azorian, the secret 1974 effort by the Central Intelligence Agency's Special Activities Division to recover the Soviet submarine K-129.

== Construction ==
The ship was built as Hughes Glomar Explorer in 1971 and 1972 by Sun Shipbuilding & Drydock Company for more than US$350 million (about $1.7 billion in 2024) at the direction of Howard Hughes for use by his company, Global Marine Development Inc. It began operation on 20 June 1974.

The ship's construction required a purpose-built crane ship, Sun 800, to lift its 630-ton gimbal into place.

Hughes told the media that the ship's purpose was to extract manganese nodules from the ocean floor. This marine geology cover story became surprisingly influential, causing many others to examine the idea.

== Project Azorian ==
The Soviet diesel-electric submarine K-129 sank in the Pacific Ocean 1,560 miles (2,510 km) NW of Hawaii, on 8 March 1968. The USS Halibut identified the wreck site and the CIA crafted an elaborate and highly secret plan to recover the submarine for intelligence purposes. As K-129 had sunk in very deep water, at a depth of 16,500 feet (3 miles or 5 kilometres), a large ship was required for the recovery operation. Such a vessel would be detected easily by Soviet vessels, which might then interfere with the operation, so an elaborate cover story was developed. The CIA contacted Hughes, who agreed to help.

In 1974, the ship recovered a portion of K-129, but as the section was being lifted to the surface, a mechanical failure in the grapple caused two-thirds of the recovered section to break off. This lost section is said to have held many of the most-sought items, including the codebook and nuclear missiles. The recovered section held two nuclear-tipped torpedoes and some cryptographic machines, along with the bodies of six Soviet submariners, who were given a formal, filmed burial at sea.

The operation became public in February 1975 when the Los Angeles Times published a story about "Project Jennifer". Other news organizations, including the New York Times, added details. The CIA declined to either confirm or deny the reports, a tactic that became known as the Glomar response and subsequently used to confront all manner of journalistic and public inquiry, including Freedom of Information Act requests. The actual name, Project Azorian, became public only in 2010.

In Red Star Rogue (2005), Kenneth Sewell claims "Project Jennifer" recovered virtually all of K-129 from the ocean floor. Sewell states, "[D]espite an elaborate cover-up and the eventual claim that Project Jennifer had been a failure, most of K-129 and the remains of the crew were, in fact, raised from the bottom of the Pacific and brought into the Glomar Explorer". (Note: Minutes of the Sixth Plenary Session, USRJC, Moscow, 31 August 1993.)

A 2010 book by Michael White and Norman Polmar (Project Azorian: The CIA and the Raising of the K-129) revealed testimony from on-site crewmen and black-and-white video of the actual recovery operation. These sources indicate that only the forward 38 ft (12 m) of the submarine were recovered.

== After Project Azorian ==
=== Mothballing ===
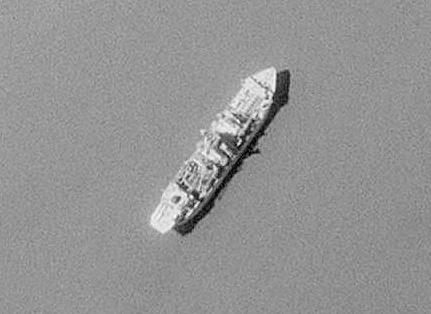
Glomar Explorer mothballed in Suisun Bay, California in June 1993

While the ship had an enormous lifting capacity, there was little interest in operating the vessel because of her great cost. From March to June 1976, the General Services Administration (GSA) published advertisements inviting businesses to submit proposals for leasing the ship. After four months, GSA had received a total of seven bids, including a US$2 offer submitted by Braden Ryan, a Lincoln, Nebraska, college student, and a US$1.98 million offer ($8.47 million in 2024) from a man who said he planned to seek a government contract to salvage the nuclear reactors of two United States submarines. The Lockheed Missiles and Space Company submitted a proposal to lease the ship for two years for US$3 million ($12.83 million in 2024) if the company could find financing. GSA had already extended the bid deadline twice to allow Lockheed to find financial backers for its project without success and the agency concluded there was no reason to believe this would change during the near future.

The scientific community rallied to the defense of Hughes Glomar Explorer, urging the president to maintain the ship as a national asset. But no agency or department of the government wanted to assume the maintenance and operating cost. Subsequently, during September 1976, the GSA transferred Hughes Glomar Explorer to the Navy for storage, and during January 1977, after it was prepared for dry docking at a cost of more than $2 million, the ship became part of the Navy's Suisun Bay Reserve Fleet.

=== Lease, sale and disposal ===
In September 1978, Ocean Minerals Company consortium of Mountain View, California, announced it had leased Hughes Glomar Explorer and that in November would begin testing a prototype deep-sea mining system in the Pacific Ocean. The consortium included subsidiaries of the Standard Oil Company of Indiana, Shell and Royal Boskalis of the Netherlands. The consortium's prime contractor was the Lockheed Missiles and Space Company.

In late 1996, the ship was towed from the mothball fleet in Suisun Bay to San Francisco Bay, where much of the existing rig structure around the moon pool, including the massive gimbal was removed. Following this, she was towed north to Portland, Oregon, for drydocking, closing up much of the submarine-sized moon pool, and engine repairs, among other things.

In June 1997, the ship departed Portland under its own power and sailed around South America and up to Atlantic Marine's shipyard in Mobile, Alabama, for conversion to a dynamically positioned deep sea drilling ship, capable of drilling in waters of 7,500 feet (2,300 m) and, with some modification, up to 11,500 feet (3,500 m), which was 2,000 feet (610 m) deeper than any other existing rig at the time. The conversion cost more than $180 million ($322 million in 2024) and was completed during the first quarter of 1998.

The conversion of the vessel from 1996 to 1998 was the start of a 30-year lease from the United States Navy to Global Marine Drilling at a cost of US$1 million per year ($1.8 million per year in 2024). Global Marine merged with Santa Fe International Corporation during 2001 to become GlobalSantaFe Corporation, which merged with Transocean in November 2007 and operated the vessel as GSF Explorer.

In 2010, Transocean bought the vessel for US$15 million ($21 million in 2024) in cash.

The vessel was reflagged from Houston to Port Vila, Vanuatu, in the third quarter of 2013.

During her 18-year drilling career, she worked in the Gulf Of Mexico, Nigeria, the Black Sea, Angola, Indonesia and India, with various shipyards and port visits along the way, with numerous oil company clients. Crew members fondly referred to her as "The Mothership".

Transocean announced in April 2015 that the ship would be scrapped. The ship arrived at the ship breakers at Zhoushan, China, on 5 June 2015.

== See also ==
- Glomar Challenger
- Hughes Mining Barge
- Special Activities Division
