= USS Halibut (SSGN-587) =

US Navy submarine

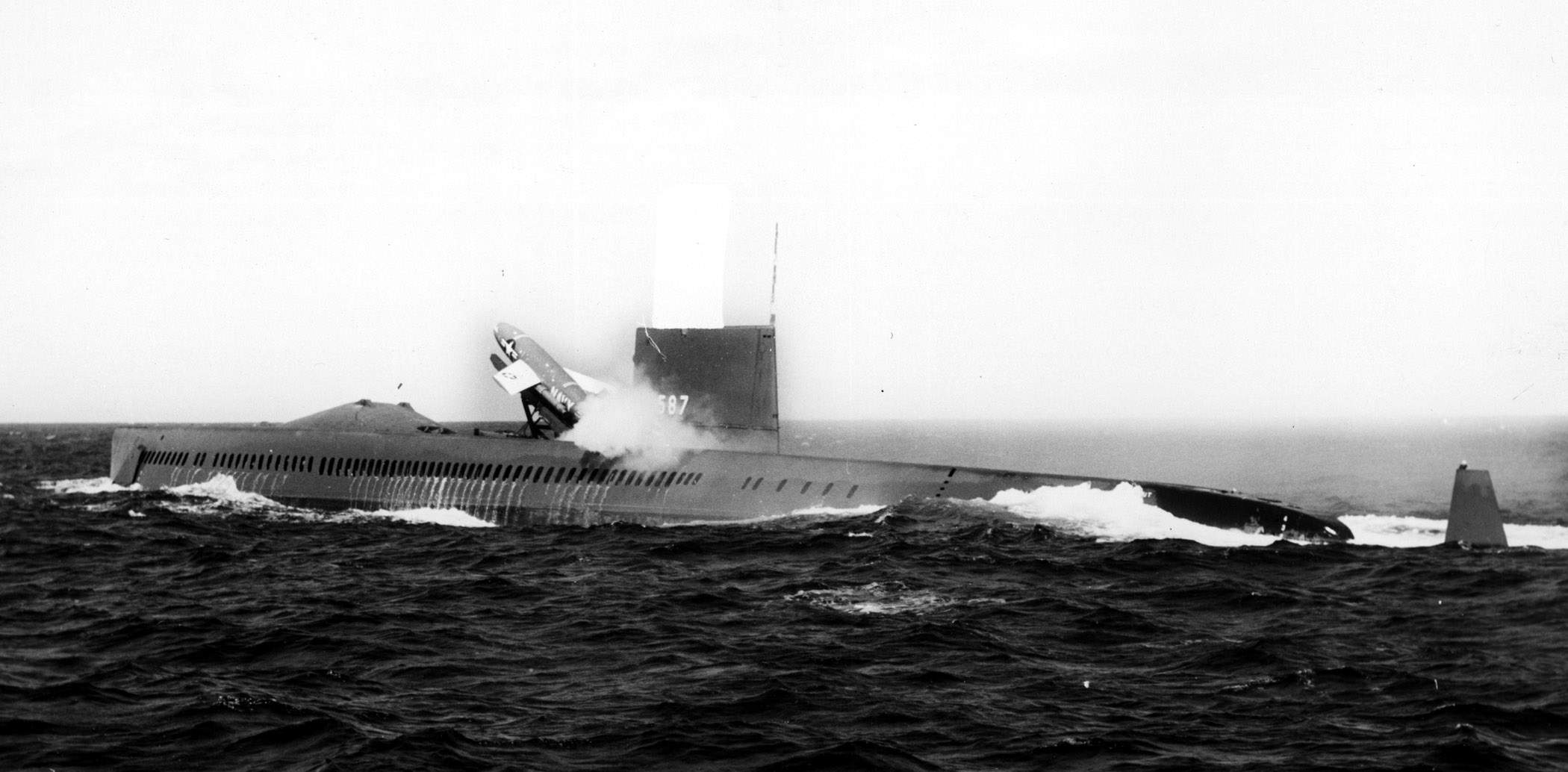
- USS Halibut

History

United States
- Name: USS Halibut
- Namesake: The halibut
- Laid down: 11 April 1957
- Launched: 9 January 1959
- Sponsored by: Vernice Holifield
- Commissioned: 4 January 1960
- Decommissioned: 30 June 1976
- Reclassified: From SSGN-587 to SSN-587, 15 April 1965
- Stricken: 30 April 1986
- Fate: Disposed of through the Ship-Submarine Recycling Program, 9 September 1994

General characteristics
- Type: SSGN 1960–1965; Attack submarine 1965–1976
- Displacement: 3655 tons surfaced, 5000 tons submerged
- Length: 350 ft (110 m)
- Beam: 29 ft (8.8 m)
- Draft: 28 ft (8.5 m)
- Propulsion: S3W reactor, 7300 shp; two turbines, two shafts
- Speed: 15/20^{+}kt (28/37 km/h) (surfaced/submerged)
- Range: unlimited except by food supplies
- Complement: 9 officers and 88 men
- Armament: 1 Regulus missile launcher (5 x Regulus I or 2 x Regulus II missiles); 6 × 21 inch (533 mm) torpedo tubes (four forward, two aft)

USS Halibut (SSGN-587), a unique nuclear-powered guided missile submarine-turned-special operations platform, later redesignated as an attack submarine SSN-587, was the second ship of the United States Navy to be named after the halibut.

== Operational history ==
Halibut's keel was laid down by Mare Island Naval Shipyard at Vallejo, California, on 11 April 1957. She was launched on 9 January 1959, sponsored by Vernice Holifield, wife of Congressman Chet Holifield of California, and commissioned on 4 January 1960.

=== Regulus deterrence patrols, 1960 – 1965 ===
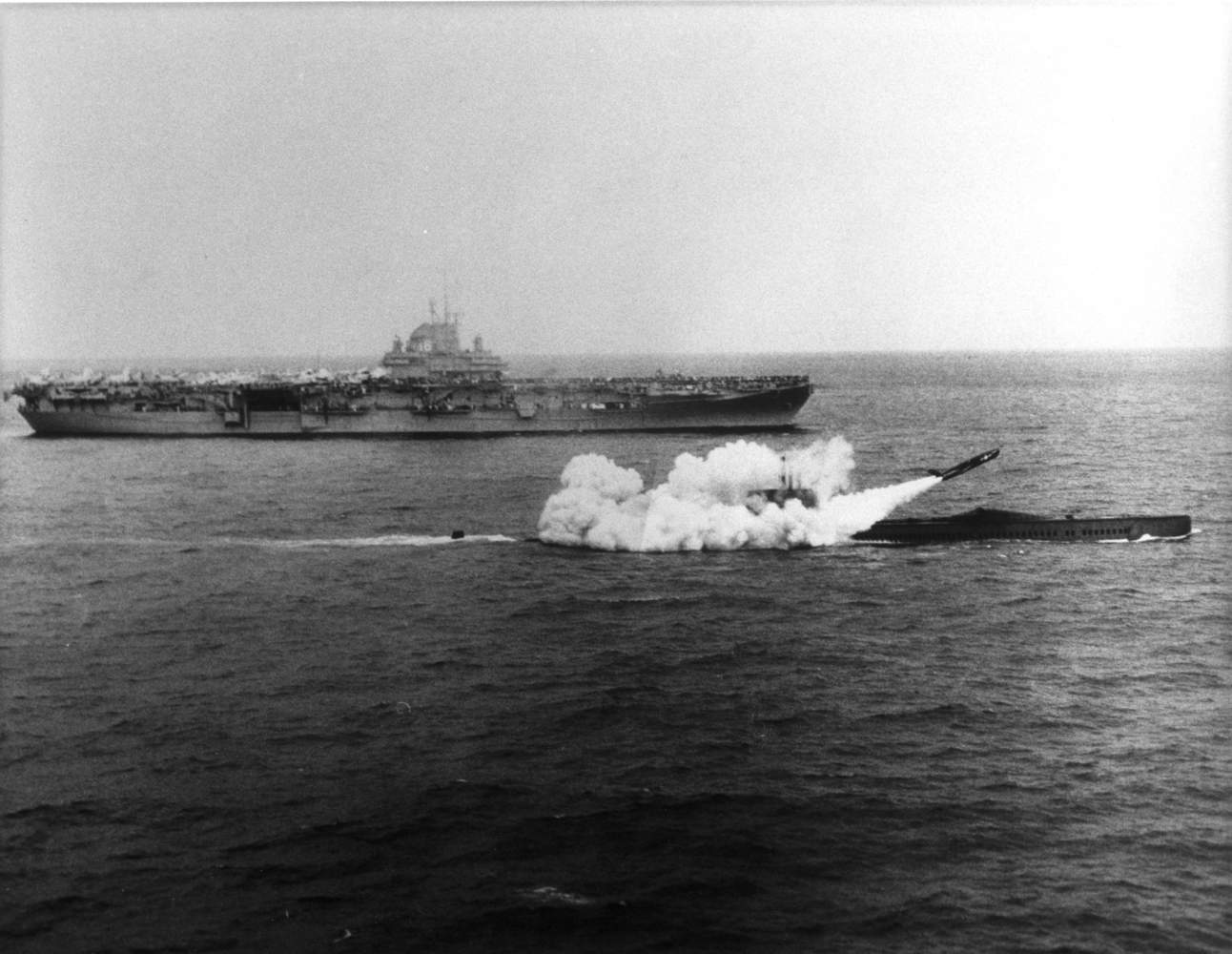
Halibut firing a Regulus missile next to the aircraft carrier Lexington, 25 March 1960

Halibut was originally designed under project SCB 137 as a diesel-electric submarine, but was completed with nuclear power under SCB 137A. She was the first submarine initially designed to launch guided missiles. Intended to carry the Regulus I and Regulus II nuclear cruise missiles, her main deck was high above the waterline to provide a dry "flight deck." Her missile system was completely automated, with hydraulic machinery controlled from a central control station.

Halibut departed on her shakedown cruise 11 March 1960. On 25 March, underway to Australia, she became the first nuclear-powered submarine to successfully launch a guided missile. She returned to Mare Island Naval Shipyard on 18 June 1960, and after short training cruises sailed 7 November for Pearl Harbor to join the Pacific Fleet. During her first deployment she successfully launched her seventh consecutive Regulus I missile during a major Southeast Asia Treaty Organization weapons demonstration. Returning to Pearl Harbor on 9 April 1961, Halibut began her second deployment 1 May. During subsequent cruises, she participated in several missile firing exercises and underwent training.

Halibut deployed for the third time to the Western Pacific in late 1961, establishing a pattern of training and readiness operations followed through 1964. On 4 May 1964 Halibut departed Pearl Harbor for the last Regulus missile patrol to be made by a submarine in the Pacific. In total, between February 1961 and July 1964, Halibut undertook a total of seven deterrent patrols before being replaced in the Pacific by UGM-27 Polaris-equipped submarines of the Lafayette class. From September through December 1964, Halibut joined eight other submarines in testing and evaluating the attack capabilities of the Permit-class submarine.

According to the documentary Regulus: The First Nuclear Missile Submarines the primary target for Halibut in the event of a nuclear exchange would be to eliminate the Soviet naval base at Petropavlovsk-Kamchatsky. The patrols made by Halibut and its sister Regulus-firing submarines represented the first ever deterrent patrols in the history of the submarine navy, preceding those made by the Polaris missile firing submarines.

=== Special operations missions, 1965 – 1976 ===
==== Conversion for special operations (1965) ====
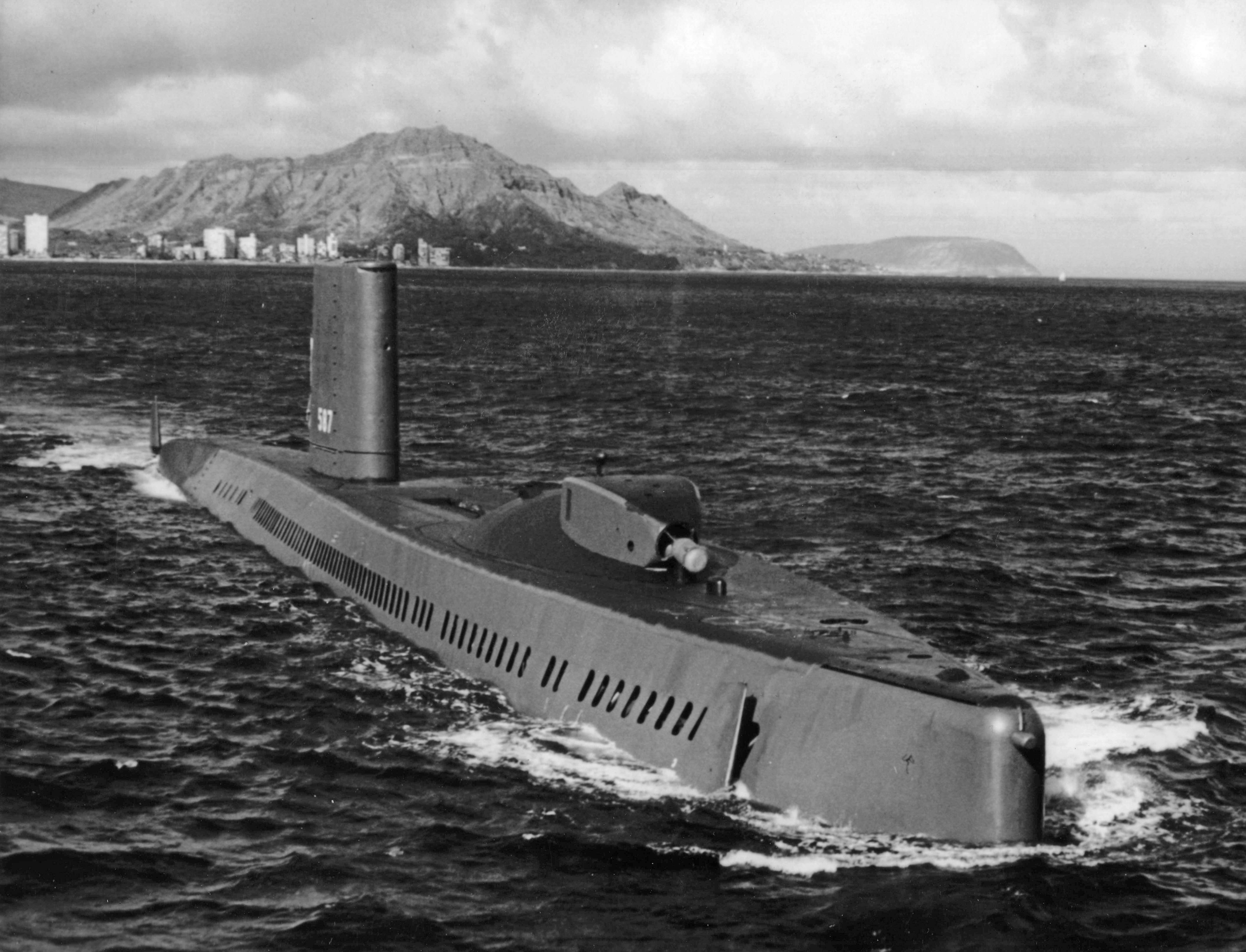
Halibut with Diamond Head in the background in late 1965. Note her topside thruster and lack of DSRV

In 1965, John P. Craven was recruited to Operation Sand Dollar by US Naval Intelligence to build a submarine that would "... Hover in place [...] and dangle cameras miles down, deep enough to scout the ocean bottom for Soviet Treasures...".

Craven was provided with a selection of either USS Seawolf or USS Halibut to convert as the budget could not commission a new, purpose-built vessel. Preferring USS Halibut, he was awarded $70 million in February 1965 to "...Out-fit her with electronic, sonic, photographic, and video gadgets...". Halibut entered Pearl Harbor Naval Shipyard for a major overhaul, and on 15 August was redesignated as an attack submarine with the hull classification symbol SSN-587.

==== Chronology of special operations (1965–1976) ====
She sailed from Pearl Harbor on 6 September for the West Coast, arriving at Keyport, Washington, on 20 September. On 5 October she departed Keyport for Pearl Harbor and, after an eight-day stop over at Mare Island, California, arrived 21 October. Halibut then began ASW operations in the area, continuing until August 1968 when she transferred to Mare Island for overhaul and installation of: side thrusters; hangar section sea lock; anchoring winches with fore and aft mushroom anchors; saturation diving (mixed gas) habitat; long and short range side-look sonar; video and photographic equipment; Sperry UNIVAC 1224 mainframe computer; induction tapping and recording equipment; port and starboard, fore and aft seabed skids ("sneakers"); towed underwater search vehicle ("fish") and winch; and other specialized oceanographic equipment. She returned to Pearl Harbor in 1970 and operated with the Pacific Fleet and Submarine Development Group One (SubDevGruOne) out of Naval Submarine Support Facility San Diego (present day Naval Base Point Loma / Ballast Point) with attachment offices at Mare Island until decommissioning in 1976.

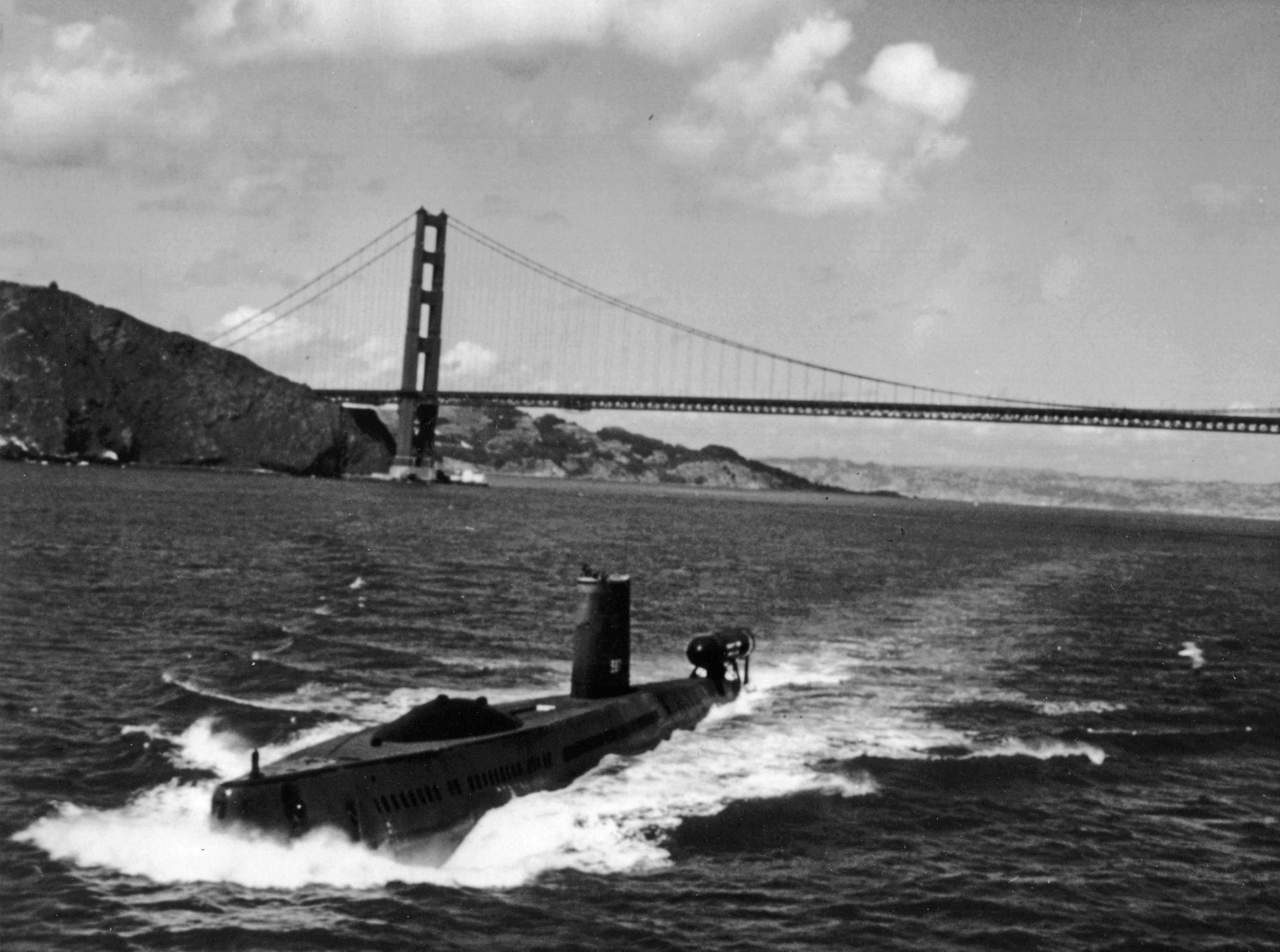
View of Halibut departing San Francisco, likely in the mid-1970s.

Halibut was used on underwater espionage missions by the US against the Soviet Union. Her most notable accomplishments include:

- The underwater tapping of a Soviet communication line running from the Kamchatka peninsula west to the Soviet mainland in the Sea of Okhotsk (Operation Ivy Bells)
- Surveying sunken Soviet submarine K-129 in August 1968, prior to the CIA's Project Azorian.

The latter mission is profiled in the 1996 book, Spy Sub – A Top Secret Mission to the Bottom of the Pacific, by Dr. Roger C. Dunham, although Dunham was required to change the name of Halibut to that of the non-existent USS Viperfish with a false hull number of SSN-655 to pass Department of Defense security restrictions for publication.

== Final disposition ==
Halibut was decommissioned on 30 June 1976. She was "mothballed" at Keyport/Bangor Trident Base, Washington in 1976, struck from the Naval Vessel Register on 30 April 1986, and disposed of through the Ship-Submarine Recycling Program at Puget Sound Naval Shipyard, Bremerton, Washington, on 9 September 1994.

== Awards and commendations ==
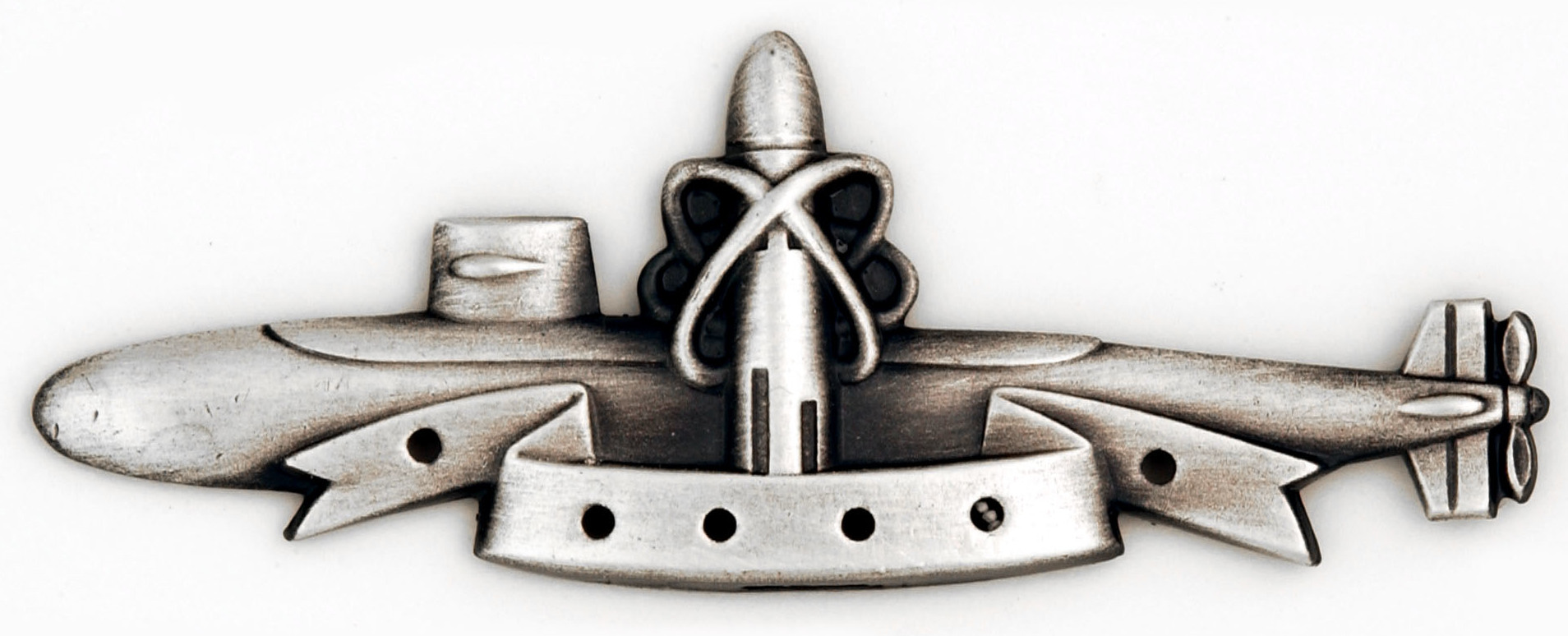

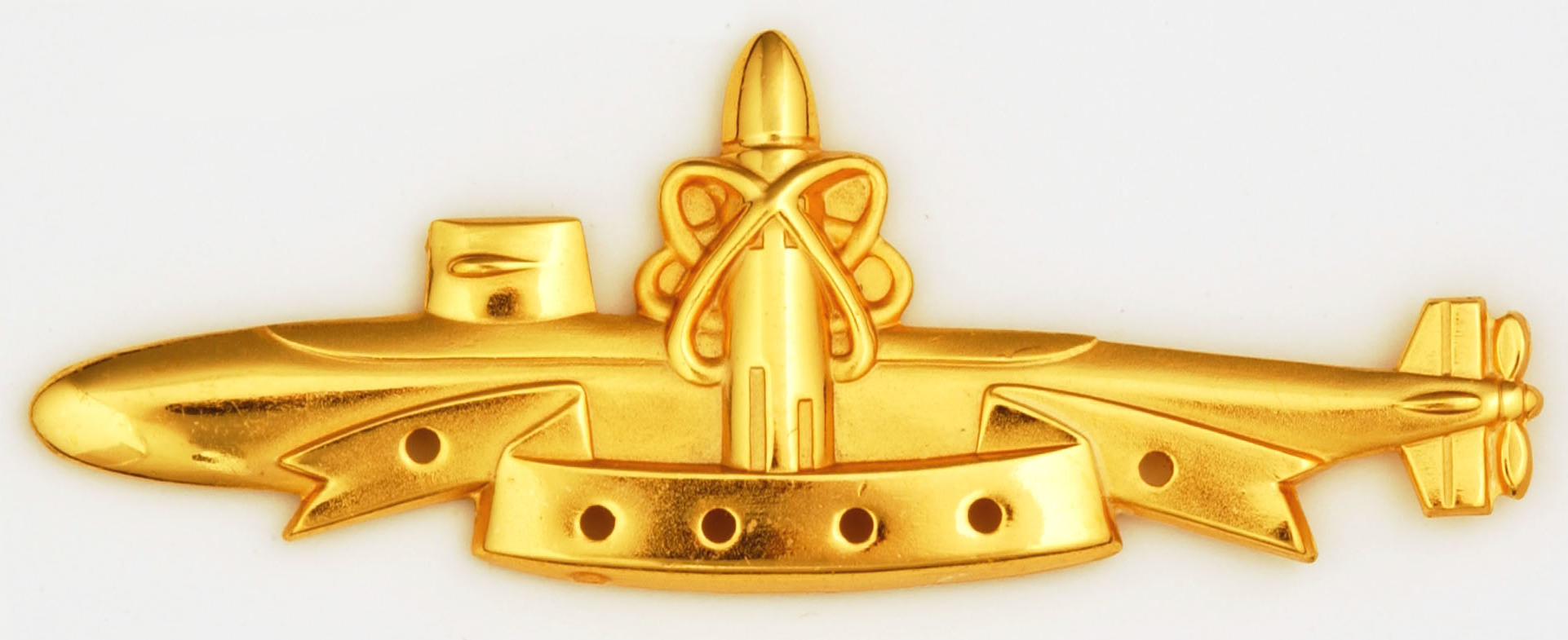
Crewmen that served aboard Halibut and conducted strategic deterrent patrols were permitted to wear the SSBN Deterrent Patrol insignia from 1997. Crew of Halibut are permitted to wear the silver insignia and have one silver star and one gold star, representing a total of seven successful patrols

Presidential Unit Citation with 1 star
Navy Unit Commendation with 2 stars	Navy E Ribbon with wreathed Battle "E" Device	National Defense Service Medal

In April 1997, officers and men of Halibut and the other four US Navy submarines that conducted strategic deterrent patrols in the Western Pacific between 1959 and 1964 were awarded the right to wear the Navy's SSBN Deterrent Patrol insignia.

=== Presidential Unit Citation – 1968 ===
Citation:

For exceptional meritorious service on support of National Research and Development efforts while serving as a unit in the Submarine Force, U.S. Pacific Fleet. Conducting highly technical submarine operations, over an extended period of time, USS HALIBUT (SSN-587) successfully concluded several missions of significant scientific value to the Government of the United States. The professional, military, and technical competence, and inspiring devotion to duty of HALIBUT's officers and men, reflect great credit upon themselves and the United States Naval Service.

Citation was given for the search and discovery of the wreck of a Soviet submarine K-129 in three miles of water during Project Azorian.

=== Presidential Unit Citation – 1972 ===
Citation:

For extraordinary heroism and outstanding performance of duty as a unit in the Submarine Force, United States Pacific Fleet during 1972, USS HALIBUT successfully accomplished two highly productive and complex submarine operations of immeasurable value to the Government of the United States. The superb professional competence, extremely effective teamwork and exemplary devotion to duty displayed by the officers and men of USS HALIBUT reflect great credit upon themselves, the Submarine Force and the United States Naval Service.

== See also ==
- USS Jimmy Carter (SSN-23)
- USS Parche (SSN-683)
- USS Seawolf (SSN-575)
