= List of NATO reporting names for surface-to-surface missiles =

NATO reporting name for SS series surface-to-surface missiles, with Soviet or Chinese designations:

== Soviet Union/Russia ==
=== Ground-launched ===
- SS-1 "Scunner" (R-1) and "Scud" (R-11/R-300)
- SS-2 "Sibling" (R-2)
- SS-3 "Shyster" (R-5/R-5M)
- SS-4 "Sandal" (R-12)
- SS-5 "Skean" (R-14)
- SS-6 "Sapwood" (R-7)
- SS-7 "Saddler" (R-16)
- SS-8 "Sasin" (R-9/R-9A)
- SS-9 "Scarp" (R-36)
- SS-10 "Scrag" (GR-1)
- SS-11 "Sego" (UR-100)
- SS-12 "Scaleboard" (9M76)
- SS-13 "Savage" (RT-2)
- SS-14 "Scapegoat" and "Scamp" (RT-15)
- SS-15 "Scrooge" (RT-20)
- SS-16 "Sinner" (15Zh42)
- SS-17 "Spanker" (MR-UR-100)
- SS-18 "Satan" (R-36M)
- SS-19 "Stiletto" (UR-100N)
- SS-20 "Saber" (RT-21M/15Zh45)
- SS-21 "Scarab" (9M79)
- SS-22 "Scaleboard" (9M76)
- SS-23 "Spider" (9M714)
- SS-24 "Scalpel" (RT-23)
- SS-25 "Sickle" (RT-2PM)
- SS-26 "Stone" (9K720)
- SS-27 "Sickle-B" (RT-2UTTH) (Topol-M)
- SS-28 "Saber 2" (15Zh53)
- SS-29 (RS-24) (Yars)
- SS-30 Sarmat/"Unknown" (RS-28)
- SS-X-31 Rubezh (RS-26)
- SS-X-32 (BZhRK Barguzin)
- SSC-X-9 "Skyfall" (9M730 Burevestnik)

=== Ship-launched ===
US DoD designations for SS-N series naval surface-to-surface missiles (fired from ships and submarines), with Soviet designations:

- SS-N-1 "Scrubber" (4K40) (P-1)
- SS-N-2 "Styx" (4K51) (P-15)
- SS-N-3 "Sepal" (R-35/4K44/3M44) and "Shaddock" (4K95) (P-5)
- SS-N-4 (R-13)
- SS-N-5 "Sark" (R-21)
- SS-N-6 "Serb" (R-27)
- SS-N-7 "Starbright" (4M66) (P-70 Ametist)
- SS-N-8 "Sawfly" (R-29)
- SS-N-9 "Siren" (4K85) (P-120 Malakhit)
- SS-N-12 "Sandbox" (4K77/4K80) (P-500 Bazalt)
- SS-NX-13 (R-27K)
- SS-N-14 "Silex" (83R/84R/85R)
- SS-N-15 "Starfish" (82R)
- SS-N-16 "Stallion" (86R/88R)
- SS-N-17 "Snipe" (R-31)
- SS-N-18 "Stingray" (R-29R)
- SS-N-19 "Shipwreck" (3M45) (P-700 Granit)
- SS-N-20 "Sturgeon" (R-39 Rif)
- SS-N-21 "Sampson" (S-10 Granat)
- SS-N-22 "Sunburn" (3M80) (P-270 Moskit)
- SS-N-23 "Skiff" (R-29RM), (R-29RMU2 Sineva)
- SS-N-24 "Scorpion" (3M25) Kh-80 (AS-19 Koala) (P-750 Meteorit)
- SS-N-25 "Switchblade" (3M24) Kh-35 (AS-20 Kayak) Uran
- SS-N-26 "Strobile" (3M55) (P-800 Oniks 'Yakhont')
- SS-N-27 "Sizzler" (3M54) Kalibr ("Club" is the export version.)
- SS-NX-28 - no name yet - (R-39M Grom)
- SS-N-29 - no name yet - RPK-9 Medvedka (89R)
- SS-N-30 - no name yet - (3M14) Land attack missile ("Club" is the export version.)
- SS-N-31 - R29RMU2.1 Layner
- SS-N-32 - no name yet - RSM-56 Bulava (3M30)
- SS-N-33 - no name yet - 3M22 Zircon

== China ==
=== Ground-launched ===
- CH-SS-3 (DF-4)
- CH-SS-4 (DF-5)
- CH-SS-4 Mod 2 (DF-5A)
- CH-SS-4 Mod 3 (DF-5B)
- CH-SS-5 (DF-21)
- CH-SS-5 Mod 2 (DF-21A)
- CH-SS-5 Mod 5 (DF-21D)
- CH-SS-5 Mod 6 (DF-21E)
- CH-SS-6 (DF-15)
- CH-SS-6 Mod 2 (DF-15A)
- CH-SS-6 Mod 3 (DF-15B)
- CH-SS-7 (DF-11)
- CH-SS-7 Mod 2 (DF-11A)
- CH-SS-10 (DF-31)
- CH-SS-10 Mod 2 (DF-31A)
- CH-SS-10 Mod 3 (DF-31AG)
- CH-SS-11 (DF-16)
- CH-SS-18 (DF-26)
- CH-SS-20 (DF-41)
- CH-SS-22 (DF-17)
- CH-SS-24 (DF-27)

=== Cruise missile ===
- CSSC-9 (CJ-10)
- CSSC-1 Silkworm (HY-1)
- CSSC-2 Silkworm (HY-1 Ground-launched)
- CSSC-3 Seersucker (HY-2 Ground-launched)
- CSSC-5 Saples (YJ-16)
- CSSC-6 Sawhorse (HY-3)
- CSSC-7 Sadsack (HY-4)
- CSSC-8 Saccade (YJ-83)
- CSSC-9 (CJ-10)
- CSSC-13 Splinter (CJ-100)

=== Ship-launched ===
- CSS-N-1 Scrubbrush (SY-1)
- CSS-N-2 Safflower (HY-1 Ship-launched)
- CSS-N-3 (JL-1)
- CSS-N-4 Sardine (YJ-8)
- CSS-N-5 Sabbot (SY-2)
- CSS-N-6 Saccade (YJ-83)
- CSS-N-7 (YJ-82)
- CSS-N-13 (YJ-18A)
- CSS-N-14 (JL-2)
- CSS-N-20 (JL-3)

== See also ==
NATO reporting name
