= R46 =

R46 or R-46 may refer to:

== Roads ==
- R46 expressway (Czech Republic), now the D46 motorway
- R46 (South Africa)

== Other uses ==
- R-46 (missile), a Soviet intercontinental ballistic missile
- R46 (New York City Subway car)
- Escadrille R46, a unit of the French Air Force
- R46: May cause heritable genetic damage, a risk phrase
