= List of missiles =

Below is a list of missiles, sorted alphabetically into large categories and subcategories by name and purpose.

== Other missile lists ==
Types of missiles:

- Conventional guided missiles
  - Air-to-air missile
  - Air-to-surface missile
  - Anti-radiation missile
  - Anti-ballistic missile
  - Anti-satellite weapon
  - Anti-ship missile (list)
  - Anti-submarine missile
  - Anti-tank guided missile (list)
  - Land-attack missile
  - Shoulder-launched missiles
  - Surface-to-air missile (list)
  - Surface-to-surface missile
  - Wire-guided missile
- Cruise missiles
  - Air-launched cruise missile
  - Ground-launched cruise missile
  - Submarine-launched cruise missile
- Ballistic missiles
  - Tactical ballistic missile
  - Short-range ballistic missile
  - Theatre ballistic missile
  - Medium-range ballistic missile
  - Intermediate-range ballistic missile
  - Intercontinental ballistic missile (List of ICBMs/Comparison of ICBMs)
  - Submarine-launched ballistic missile
  - Air-launched ballistic missile

== Missiles by name ==
=== A ===
- A3SM (Mistral missile) submarine mast VSHORAD system
- A3SM (MICA missile) SLAM
- A-135 ABM
- A-235 ABM
- A-3
- A-35 ABM
- A-4
- A-9
- AA-1 Alkali (NATO reporting name for the Kaliningrad K-5)
- AA-2 Atoll (NATO reporting name for the Vympel K-13)
- AA-3 Anab (NATO reporting name for the Kaliningrad K-8)
- AA-4 Awl (NATO reporting name for the Raduga K-9)
- AA-5 Ash (NATO reporting name for the Bisnovat R-4)
- AA-6 Acrid (NATO reporting name for the Bisnovat R-40)
- AA-7 Apex (NATO reporting name for the Vympel R-23)
- AA-8 Aphid (NATO reporting name for the Molniya R-60)
- AA-9 Amos (NATO reporting name for the Vympel R-33)
- AA-10 Alamo (NATO reporting name for the Vympel R-27)
- AA-11 Archer (NATO reporting name for the Vympel R-73)
- AA-12 Adder (NATO reporting name for the Vympel R-77)
- AA-13 Arrow (NATO reporting name for the Vympel R-37)
- AAM-3 (Japanese Type 90 air-to-air missile)
- AAM-4 (Japanese Type 99 air-to-air missile)
- AAM-5 (Japanese Type 04 air-to-air missile)
- AAM-N-4 Oriole
- AASM
- Abdali-I (Pakistani surface-to-surface Short-range ballistic missile)
- ABM-1 Galosh (NATO reporting name for the Russian/USSR, Vympel A-350 surface-to-air Anti-Ballistic Missile)
- ABM-3 Gazelle (NATO reporting name for the Russian/USSR A-135 surface-to-air Anti-Ballistic Missile)
- A-Darter
- ADATS (Swiss-American)
- ADM-20 Quail
- ADM-141 TALD
- ADM-160 MALD
- AGM-12 Bullpup
- AGM-22
- AGM-28 Hound Dog
- AGM-45 Shrike
- AGM-48 Skybolt
- AGM-53 Condor
- AGM-62 Walleye
- AGM-63
- AGM-64 Hornet
- AGM-65 Maverick
- AGM-69 SRAM
- AGM-76 Falcon
- AGM-78 Standard ARM
- AGM-79 Blue Eye
- AGM-80 Viper
- AGM-83 Bulldog
- AGM-84 Harpoon
- AGM-84E SLAM
- AGM-84H/K SLAM-ER
- AGM-86 ALCM
- AGM-87 Focus
- AGM-88 HARM
- AGM-112
- AGM-114 Hellfire
- AGM-119 Penguin (Norwegian-made; only non-US-made missile in US arsenal)
- AGM-122 Sidearm
- AGM-123 Skipper
- AGM-124 Wasp
- AGM-129 ACM
- AGM-130
- AGM-131 SRAM II
- AGM-136 Tacit Rainbow
- AGM-137 TSSAM
- AGM-142 Have Nap US codename for imported Popeye missiles
- AGM-153
- AGM-154 JSOW
- AGM-158 JASSM
- AGM-159 JASSM
- AGM-169 Joint Common Missile
- AGM-176 Griffin
- AGM-179 JAGM
- AGM-183A ARRW
- Agni-I (India)
- Agni-II (India)
- Agni-III (India)
- Agni-IV (India)
- Agni-V (India)
- Agni-VI (India)
- Agni-P (India)
- AIM-4 Falcon
- AIM-7 Sparrow
- AIM-9 Sidewinder
- AIM-26 Falcon
- AIM-47 Falcon
- AIM-54 Phoenix
- AIM-68 Big Q
- AIM-82
- AIM-97 Seekbat
- AIM-95 Agile
- AIM-120 AMRAAM
- AIM-132 ASRAAM
- AIM-152 AAAM
- AIM-174B ERAM
- Air-Sol Moyenne Portée (ASMP)
- Akash (India)
- Akash-NG
- Alacrán (Spanish for "Scorpion")
- ALARM
- ALAS
- Al-Hussein
- Al-Samoud 2
- ANL (Franco-British)
- Anza
- Apache
- Arrow (Israeli missile) (Anti-ballistic)
- AS-25K (anti-ship)
- AS-20
- AS-30
- AS.34 Kormoran
- ASM-1 (Japanese Type 80 air-to-ship missile)
- ASM-2 (Japanese Type 93 air-to-ship missile)
- ASM-135 ASAT
- ASMP
- Aspide
- ASRAAM (project name for the AIM-132 ASRAAM)
- ASGLA (Igla missile) (Germano-Ukrainian) land-based VSHORAD system
- ASRAD (Stinger, RBS-70 mk2, Igla, Mistral, Starburst missiles) land-based VSHORAD system
- ASRAD-2 land-based VSHORAD system
- ASRAD-R (Bolide missile) (Germano-Swedish) land-based VSHORAD system
- ASRAD-R Naval (Bolide missile) (Germano-Swedish) shipboard VSHORAD system
- Aster
- Astra (BVR Mk I)(INDIAN)
- Astra (BVR MK II) (INDIAN)
- Astra (BVR MK III) (INDIAN)
- Astra (IR) (INDIAN)
- Ataka (Russian anti-tank missile)
- AT-1K Raybolt
- ATILGAN PMSS naval/land-based VSHORAD system
- Atmaca (Turkish Anti Ship Missile)
- ATM-1 (Japanese Type 64 Anti-Tank Missile)
- ATM-2 (Japanese Type 79 Anti-Landing craft and Anti-Tank Missile)
- ATM-3 (Japanese Type 87 Anti-Tank Missile)
- ATM-4 (Japanese Type 96 Multi-Purpose Missile System)
- ATM-5 (Japanese Type 01 Light Anti-Tank Missile)
- AUM-N-2 Petrel
- AV-TM 300 (Brazilian Cruise Missile)

=== B ===
- Babur (Pakistani Cruise Missile)
- BAC Vigilant
- Bantam
- Barak 1 naval point defense surface-to-air missile (Israel)
- Barak 8 naval area defense surface-to-air missile (Israel-India)
- Barak MX
- BGM-34 Firebee
- BGM-71 TOW
- BGM-75 AICBM
- BGM-109 Tomahawk
- BGM-110
- Baktar-Shikan (Pakistani Anti-tank Guided Missile)
- Black Arrow (United Kingdom)
- Bloodhound UK Surface-to-air
- Blowfish submarine mast VSHORAD system
- Blowpipe UK Man portable Surface-to-air
- Blue Steel nuclear stand off missile (United Kingdom)
- Blue Streak (United Kingdom)
- Bofors Bantam
- Bozdoğan (Turkish AA Missile)
- BrahMos (India-Russia; World's fastest cruise missile)
- Brakemine UK WWII project
- Brimstone (United Kingdom)

=== C ===
- C-602
- C-701
- c-704
- c-705
- C-802
- CA-94
- CA-95
- CGM-16 Atlas
- CGM-121B Seek Spinner
- Chusovaya (popular name for the R-14 Chusovaya)
- CIM-10 Bomarc
- Roketsan Cirit (Turkey)
- Cobra
- Cobra (Germano-Swiss)
- Cobra 2000 (Germano-Swiss)
- Condor (Argentina)
- Crotale (France)

=== D ===
- Desna (popular name for the R-9 Desna intercontinental ballistic missile)
- Dnipro
- Dongfeng 1 (SS-2) (DF-1)
- Dongfeng 2 (CSS-1) (DF-2)
- Dongfeng 3 (CSS-2) (DF-3)
- Dongfeng 4 (CSS-3) (DF-4)
- Dongfeng 5 (CSS-4) (DF-5)
- Dongfeng 11 (CSS-7) (DF-11)
- Dongfeng 12 (CSS-X-15) (DF-12)
- Dongfeng 15 (CSS-6) (DF-15)
- Dongfeng 16 (DF-16)
- Dongfeng 21 (CSS-5) (DF-21)
- Dongfeng 25 (DF-25)
- Dongfeng 31 (CSS-10) (DF-31)
- Dongfeng 41 (CSS-X-10) (DF-41)
- Dvina (popular name for the R-12 Dvina theatre ballistic missile)

=== E ===
- EGBU-15
- Elbrus (popular name for the R-300, a Scud variant)
- Emad
- Enforcer
- ENTAC (France)
- Enzian
- Eryx (France)
- Euromissile HOT anti-armour missile
- EuroSpike (Germano-Israeli)
- Exocet (popular name for the MBDA Exocet)

=== F ===
- Fateh-110
- Fireflash
- Firestreak
- FGM-77 MAW
- FGM-148 Javelin
- FGM-172 SRAW
- Fieseler Fi 103, the V-1
- FIM-43 Redeye
- FIM-92 Stinger
- FROG-7

FP-5 Flamingo

=== G ===
- Gabriel (Ship-to-ship and air-to-ship variant)
- GAF Malkara
- GAM-87 Skybolt
- Ghauri-I (Pakistani)
- Ghauri-II (Pakistani)
- Ghauri-III
- Global Rocket 1 fractional orbital bombardment system missile (Russia; Cold War) (NATO reporting name SS-X-10 Scrag)
- Gorodomlya G-1 - Developed by a German team at Gorodomlya island (57°12'0.06"N, 33° 4'0.02"E) in 1948, based on the V-2 with detachable warhead and integral propellant tanks. (a.k.a. R-10).
- Gorodomlya G-1M - The G-1 with a more powerful engine proposed in 1949.
- Gorodomlya G-2 - (a.k.a. R-12) Developed as far as preliminary design the G-2 first stage was to have been powered by a cluster of three engines from the G-1 with a thrust of approx 100tons, the second stage being capable of delivering the warhead 2,000 to 2,500 kilometres. Insurmountable problems with control of the second stage forced abandonment.
- Gorodomlya G-3 - The G-3 project was to have been a two-stage, G-1 derived rocket, with a winged upper stage similar to the A9 developed by Wernher Von Braun's team at Peenemünde, for a projected range of 8,000 to 10,000 kilometres
- Gorodomlya G-4 - In April 1949 the Gorodomlya group were given the same requirements as the team at NII-88 (which produced the R-3). The German group designed a 24m (78 ft 9in) tall cone shaped rocket with an empty weight (including a three-ton warhead) of seven tons and a launch weight of 70.85 tons, (a.k.a. R-14).
- Gorodomlya G-5 - Designed in parallel with the G-4, (a.k.a. R-15), another group at Gorodomlya proposed a ramjet powered unmanned bomber boosted by a G-1 or A4 rocket, cruising at 15 km (9 mi) altitude for a range of 3,000 kilometres.
- Gökdoğan (Turkish AA missile)
- Gökhan (Turkish AA missile)
- Green Cheese (missile)
- Green Flash (missile)
- AGM-176 Griffin
- Kh-23 Grom
- PZR Grom

=== H ===
- Hadès
- Harpoon
- Hatf-I
- Hatf-IA
- Hatf-IB
- Hatf-VA
- Hatf-VIII
- Hatf-VIII (Ra'ad)
- HGM-16 Atlas
- Hisar-A (Turkish SAM)
- Hisar-O (Turkish SAM)
- Hisar-RF (Turkish SAM)
- Hongqi-1 SAM
- Hongqi-2 SAM
- Hongying-5 SAM
- Hongqi-7 SAM
- Hongqi-9 SAM
- Hongqi-10 SAM
- Hongqi-15 SAM
- Hongqi-17 SAM
- Hongqi-18 SAM
- Hongqi-61 SAM
- HOT (popular name for the Euromissile HOT anti-armour missile)
- Hrim-2
- Hsiung Feng I (HF-1) (ship-to-ship)
- Hsiung Feng II (HF-2) (guided multiplatform antiship)
- Hsiung Feng IIE (HF-2E) (land attack cruise missile variant of HF-2)
- Hsiung Feng III (HF-3) (anti-ship cruise missile)
- Hyunmoo
- Hwasal-1
- Hwasal-2
- Hwasong-5
- Hwasong-6
- Hwasong-7
- Hwasong-8
- Hwasong-9
- Hwasong-10
- Hwasong-11 (KN-02)
- Hwasong-11A (KN-23)
- Hwasong-11B (KN-24)
- Hwasong-11C
- Hwasong-11D
- Hwasong-11E
- Hwasong-11S
- Hwasong-12
- Hwasong-12A (official designation unconfirmed)
- Hwasong-12B
- Hwasong-13 (two versions, called KN-08 and KN-14 by United States)
- Hwasong-14
- Hwasong-15
- Hwasong-16A (official designation unconfirmed)
- Hwasong-16B
- Hwasong-17
- Hwasong-18
- Hwasong-19
- Hwasong-20

=== I ===
- IDAS
- Ingwe
- IRIS-T
- Iskander-M

=== J ===
- J-Missile
- Javelin (Anti-tank missile)
- Javelin (Surface-to-air missile)
- Jericho missile (Ground-to-ground ballistic)
- JL-1
- JL-2
- JL-3

=== K ===
- K-10S
- K-4 (SLBM) (India)
- K-5 (SLBM) (India)
- K-15 (SLBM) (India)
- Kalibr
- Kaliningrad K-5 (AA-1 Alkali)
- Kaliningrad K-8 (AA-3 Anab)
- KAN Little Joe
- Raduga K-9 (AA-4 Awl)
- Vympel K-13 (AA-2 Atoll)
- Kaishan-1 SAM
- Kh-15
- Kh-20
- Kh-22
- Kh-23
- Kh-25
- Kh-28
- Kh-29
- Kh-31
- Kh-32
- Kh-35
- Kh-38
- Kh-45
- Kh-47M2 Kinzhal
- Kh-55
- Kh-58
- Kh-59
- Kh-80
- Kh-90
- Kh-101
- Khalij Fars ASBM
- KS-1
- KSR-5
- Kumsong-3

=== L ===
- LAM (Loitering Attack Missile)
- LEM-70 Minuteman ERCS
- LFK NG
- LGM-25 Titan
- LGM-25C Titan II
- LGM-30 Minuteman
  - Minuteman I
  - Minuteman II
  - Minuteman III
- LGM-35 Sentinel
- LGM-118 Peacekeeper
- Lieying-60 SAM
- LIM-49 Spartan
- LIM-99
- LIM-100
- Little Joe (shipborne surface-to-air)
- Long March cruise missile

=== M ===
- M1 SLBM (France) submarine-launched ballistic missile
- M2 SLBM (France)
- M4 SLBM (France)
- M20 SLBM (France)
- M45 SLBM (France)
- M51 SLBM (France)
- Magic (popular name for the R550 Magic)
- Mectron MAA-1 Piranha (short-range air-air infrared homing missile)
- Malkara (joint Australian/British)
- Mamba (Germano-Swiss)
- MANSUP (family of anti-ship, land-attack and surface-to-air missiles)
- Martin Pescador MP-1000 anti-ship ASM (Argentina)
- Mathogo anti-tank, wire-guided (Argentina)
- MBB Cobra
- MBDA Apache
- MBDA AS-30
- MBDA Aster
- MBDA Exocet
- MBDA Meteor
- MBDA Scalp EG
- MGM-1 Matador
- MGM-5 Corporal
- MGM-13 Mace
- MGM-18 Lacrosse
- MGM-21
- MGM-29 Sergeant
- MGM-31 Pershing
- MGM-32 ENTAC
- MGM-51 Shillelagh
- MGM-52 Lance
- MGM-140 ATACMS
- MGM-134 Midgetman
- MGM-157 EFOGM
- MGM-164 ATACMS II
- MGM-166 LOSAT
- MGM-168 ATACMS Block IVA
- MGR-1 Honest John
- MHT/MLP
- MICA (project name for the MBDA MICA)
- MILAN
- MIM-3 Nike-Ajax
- MIM-14 Nike-Hercules
- MIM-23 Hawk
- MIM-46 Mauler
- MIM-72 Chaparral
- MIM-104 Patriot
- MIM-115 Roland
- MIM-146 ADATS
- Miniature Hit-to-Kill Missile
- MISTRAL
- MMP (anti-tank)
- MMP/SEA LAUNCHED (ship-to-ship/shore)
- Mokopa
- Molodets (popular name for the RT-23 Molodets)
- Mosquito (Germano-Swiss)
- MR-UR-100 Sotka intercontinental ballistic missile (Russia; Cold War) (NATO reporting name SS-17 Spanker)
- MX: See LGM-118 Peacekeeper

=== N ===
- Nag (Indian Anti-Tank Guided Missile)
- Nirbhay (India)
- Naval Strike Missile (NSM)
- Neptune
- Nike
- Nord 5203 surface-to-surface missile (SS.10) (France)
- Nord 5210 surface-to-surface / air-to-surface missile (SS.11) (France)
- Nord SS.10 surface-to-surface missile (France)
- Nord SS.11 surface-to-surface / air-to-surface missile (France)
- Nord SS.12 surface-to-surface missile (France)
- Nulka (Australia)

=== O ===
- OTR-21 Tochka tactical ballistic missile (USSR; Cold War) (NATO name SS-21 Scarab)
- OTR-23 Oka theatre ballistic missile (USSR; Cold War) (NATO name SS-23 Spider)
- Otomat

=== P ===
- P-1 (SS-N-1 Scrubber)
- P-15 Termit (SS-N-2 Styx)
- P-120 Malakhit (SS-N-9 Siren)
- P-270 Moskit
- P-500 Bazalt (SS-N-12 Sandbox)
- P-700 Granit (SS-N-19 Shipwreck)
- P-800 Oniks (SS-N-26 Strobile)
- P-1000 Vulkan (SS-N-12 Mod 2)
- PAAMS (MBDA Aster missile) (Franco-British-Italian) shipboard SHORAD/MRAD system
- Padasuri-6
- PAD
- PARS 3 LR
- Penguin (U.S. designation: AGM-119)
- Pershing II Weapon System
- PL-2 (domestic variant of the AA-2 Atoll)
- PL-5
- PL-7
- PL-9 SAM (PenLung)
- PL-10 (PenLung)
- PL-12
- PL-15
- PL-16
- PL-17
- Polyphem
- PGM-11 Redstone
- PGM-17 Thor
- PGM-19 Jupiter
- Pluton
- PMADS naval/land-based VSHORAD system
- Pongae-5 (KN-06)
- Popeye (Standoff. U.S. designation AGM-142 Have Nap. A cruise missile variant purportedly exists as well)
- Prahaar(India)
- Prithvi (India)
- Prithvi II (India)
- Prithvi III (India)
- Pukguksong-1
- Pukguksong-2
- Pukguksong-3
- Pukguksong-4
- Pukguksong-5
- Pukguksong-6 (official designation unconfirmed)
- Pulhwasal-3-31
- Pye Python
- Pyoljji-1-2
- Python 5 (popular name for Rafael Python 5)

=== Q ===
- Qassam rocket
- Qiam 1 surface-to-surface missile (Iran)
- QRSAM quick reaction SAM (India)
- QW-1 SAM
- QW-2 SAM

=== R ===
- R-1 theatre ballistic missile (SS-1 Scunner)
- R-2 theatre ballistic missile (SS-2 Sibling)
- R-4 (AA-5 Ash)
- R-5 Pobeda theatre ballistic missile (SS-3 Shyster)
- R-7 Semyorka intercontinental ballistic missile (USSR/Russia; Cold War) (NATO name SS-6 Sapwood)
- R-9 Desna intercontinental ballistic missile (USSR/Russia; Cold War) (NATO name SS-8 Sasin)
- R-11 Zemlya tactical ballistic missile (USSR; Cold War) (NATO name SS-1b Scud)
- R-12 Dvina theatre ballistic missile (USSR; Cold War) (NATO name SS-4 Sandal)
- R-13 submarine-launched ballistic missile (USSR; Cold War) (SS-N-4 Sark)
- R-14 Chusovaya theatre ballistic missile (USSR; Cold War) (NATO name SS-5 Skean)
- R-15 submarine ballistic missile (USSR; Cold War)
- R-16 intercontinental ballistic missile (USSR; Cold War) (NATO name SS-7 Saddler)
- R-17E, variant of Russian Scud B
- R-21 submarine-launched ballistic missile (USSR; Cold War) (SS-N-5 Serb)
- R-23 (AA-7 Apex)
- R-26 intercontinental ballistic missile (USSR; Cold War) (mistakenly applied NATO name SS-8 Sasin)
- R-27 (AA-10 Alamo)
- R-27 Zyb submarine-launched ballistic missile (USSR; Cold War) (SS-N-6 Serb)
- R-29 Vysota
- R-29RM Shtil
- R-29RMU Sineva
- R-29RMU2 Layner
- R-33 (AA-9 Amos)
- R-36 intercontinental ballistic missile (USSR/Ukraine) (NATO name SS-9 Scarp and SS-18 Satan)
- R-39 Rif (SS-N-20 Sturgeon)
- R-40 (AA-6 Acrid)
- R-46 orbital launcher and intercontinental ballistic missile (Russia; Cold War)
- R-60 (AA-8 Aphid)
- R-73 (AA-11 Archer)
- R-77 (AA-12 Adder)
- R-300 Elbrus theatre ballistic missile (USSR; Cold War) (NATO name SS-1c Scud)
- R550 Magic
- Ra'ad (air-launched cruise missile), or Hatf-VIII, Pakistani weapon
- Ra'ad (anti-ship missile), Iranian weapon
- RAAD (anti-tank guided missile)
- Rapier (Surface-to-air missile)
- Rafael Python 5 (Air-to-air missile)
- RBS-15
- RBS-23
- RBS-70
- RBS-77
- RBS-90
- Red Top Air-to-air
- RGM-6 Regulus
- RGM-15 Regulus II
- RGM-59 Taurus
- RGM-165 LASM
- RIM-2 Terrier
- RIM-7 Sea Sparrow
- RIM-8 Talos
- RIM-24 Tartar
- RIM-50 Typhon LR
- RIM-55 Typhon MR
- RIM-66 Standard Missile-1
- RIM-66 Standard Missile-2
- RIM-67 Standard Missile-1 ER
- RIM-67 Standard Missile-2 ER
- RIM-85
- RIM-101
- RIM-113
- RIM-116 Rolling Airframe Missile
- RIM-156 Standard Missile-2ER Block IV
- RIM-161 Standard Missile-3
- RIM-162 ESSM
- RIM-174 Standard ERAM
- ROLAND air defence missile
- RS-24 Yars intercontinental ballistic missile (Russia; Modern)
- RSA
- RSA-1 mobile missile
- RSA-2 IRBM
- RSA-3 IRBM & SLV
- RSA-4 ICBM & SLV
- RSC-54
- RSC-56
- RSC-57
- RSC/RSD 58
- RSD-10 Pioneer theatre ballistic missile (USSR; Cold war) (SS-20 Saber)
- RSE Kriens
- RSM-56 Bulava
- RT-1 theatre ballistic missile (USSR; Cold War)
- RT-2 intercontinental ballistic missile (Russia; Cold War) (SS-13 Savage)
- RT-2PM Topol intercontinental ballistic missile (Russia; Modern) (SS-25 Sickle)
- RT-2PM2 Topol-M intercontinental ballistic missile (Russia; Modern) (SS-27 Sickle B)
- RT-15 mobile land launched theatre ballistic missile (USSR; Cold War) (SS-14 Scamp)
- RT-20 intercontinental ballistic missile (USSR; Cold War) (SS-15 Scrooge)
- RT-21 Temp 2S intercontinental ballistic missile (USSR; Cold War) (SS-16 Sinner)
- RT-23 Molodets intercontinental ballistic missile (Russia; Modern) (SS-24 Scalpel)
- RT-25 theatre ballistic missile (USSR; Cold War)
- Rudram-1 Indian Air launched Anti-radiation missile also known as NGARM
- RUM-139 VL-Asroc
- RUR-5 Asroc

=== S ===
- S1 IRBM
- S2 IRBM
- S3 IRBM
- S-300
- S-300VM
- S-350 Vityaz
- S-400 Triumf
- S-500
- SA-1 Guild (NATO reporting name for the S-25 Berkut)
- SA-2 Guideline (NATO reporting name for the S-75 Dvina)
- SA-3 Goa (NATO reporting name for the S-125 Neva/Pechora)
- SA-4 Ganef (NATO reporting name for the 2K11 Krug)
- SA-5 Gammon (NATO reporting name for the S-200)
- SA-6 Gainful (NATO reporting name for the 2K12 Kub)
- SA-7 Grail (NATO reporting name for the 9K32 Strela-2)
- SA-8 Gecko (NATO reporting name for the 9K33 Osa)
- SA-9 Gaskin (NATO reporting name for the 9K31 Strela-1)
- SA-10 Grumble (NATO reporting name for the S-300)
- SA-11 Gadfly (NATO reporting name for the 9K37 Buk)
- SA-12 Gladiator/Giant (NATO reporting name for the S-300V)
- SA-13 Gopher (NATO reporting name for the 9K35 Strela-10)
- SA-14 Gremlin (NATO reporting name for the 9K34 Strela-3)
- SA-15 Gauntlet (NATO reporting name for the 9K330 Tor)
- SA-16 Gimlet (NATO reporting name for the 9K310 Igla-1)
- SA-17 Grizzly (NATO reporting name for the Buk-M1-2)
- SA-18 Grouse (NATO reporting name for the 9K38 Igla)
- SA-19 Grisom (NATO reporting name for the 2K22 Tunguska)
- SA-20 Gargoyle (NATO reporting name for the S-300PMU-1)
- SA-21 Growler (NATO reporting name for the S-400 Triumf)
- SA-N-3 Goblet (NATO reporting name for the M-11 Shtorm)
- SA-N-5 Grail (NATO reporting name for the 9K32 Strela-2)
- Saber (SS-20) (NATO reporting name for the RSD-10 Pioneer)
- Saddler (SS-7) (NATO reporting name for the R-16)
- Samid
- Saegheh
- Sagarika (SLBM) (Indian ballistic missile)
- SAMP/T (MBDA Aster missile) (Franco-Italian) land-based SHORAD/MRAD system
- SAHV-3 (South African High Velocity) (Surface To Air Missile)
- Sejjil (MRBM) (Iranian ballistic missile)
- Sandal (SS-4) (NATO reporting name for the R-12 Dvina)
- Sapsan
- Sapwood (SS-6) (NATO reporting name for the R-7 Semyorka)
- Sark (SS-N-4) (NATO reporting name for the R-13)
- Sasin (SS-8) (NATO reporting name for the R-9 Desna, also mistakenly applied to the R-26)
- Satan (SS-18) (NATO reporting name for the R-36M)
- Savage (SS-13) (NATO reporting name for the RT-2)
- Scaleboard (SS-12 / SS-22) (NATO reporting name for the TR-1 Temp)
- SCALP EG (Franco-British)
- Scalpel (SS-24) (NATO reporting name for the RT-23 Molodets)
- Scamp (SS-14) (NATO reporting name for the RT-15)
- Scapegoat (SS-14) (alternate NATO reporting name for the RT-15)
- Scarp (SS-9) (NATO reporting name for the R-36)
- SCIFiRE (Australian-American hypersonic cruise missile in development)
- Scrag (SS-X-10) (NATO reporting name for the Global Rocket 1 and UR-200)
- Scrooge (SS-15) (NATO reporting name for the RT-20)
- Scud (SS-1b/SS-1c) (NATO reporting name for the R-11 Zemlya and R-300 Elbrus family)
- Scunner (SS-1) (NATO reporting name for the R-1)
- SD-10 (Pakistani beyond visual range air-to-air missile)
- Sea Cat
- Sea Dart
- Sea Eagle
- Sea Skua
- Sea Slug (Surface-to-air missile)
- Sea Oryx (Surface-to-air missile)
- Sea Venom (Franco-British)
- Sea Viper (MBDA Aster missile) (Franco-British-Italian) shipboard SHORAD/MRAD system
- Sea Wolf (Surface-to-air missile)
- Sego (SS-11) (NATO reporting name for the UR-100)
- Semyorka (popular name for the R-7 Semyorka)
- Serb (SS-N-5) (NATO reporting name for the R-21)
- Serb (SS-N-6) (NATO reporting name for the R-27)
- Shahab-1
- Shahab-2
- Shahab-3
- Shahab-3D
- Shahab-4
- Shahab-5 (An alleged Iranian long-range ballistic missile project)
- Shahab-6 (An alleged Iranian long-range ballistic missile project)
- Shaheen-I (Pakistani MRBM)
- Shaheen-II (Pakistani IRBM)
- Shaheen-III (Pakistani IRBM)
- Shavit (Space launcher)
- Shkval (VA-111)
- Shaurya (India)
- Shyster (SS-3) (NATO reporting name for the R-5)
- Sibling (SS-2) (NATO reporting name for the R-2)
- Sickle (SS-25) (NATO reporting name for the RT-2PM Topol)
- Silkworm subsonic cruise missile
- Sinner (SS-16) (NATO reporting name for the RT-21 Temp 2S)
- SİPER (Turkish SAM)
- Skean (SS-5) (NATO reporting name for the R-14 Chusovaya)
- Sky Bow I (TK-1) (SAM)
- Sky Bow II (TK-2) (SAM)
- Sky Bow III (TK-3) (SAM)
- Sky Bow IV (TK-4) (SAM)
- Sky Spear (Short range SSBM)
- Sky Sword I (TC-1) (air-to-air)
- Sky Sword II (TC-2) (air-to-air)
- SLAM
- SLAM-ER
- SM-62 Snark
- SM-73 Goose (decoy cruise missile)
- SM-74 (proposed decoy cruise missile)
- SOM (Turkish Cruise Missile)
- Sotka (popular name for the MR-UR-100 Sotka)
- Spanker (SS-17) (NATO reporting name for the MR-UR-100 Sotka)
- Spartan LIM-49A ABM
- Spider (SS-23) (NATO reporting name for the OTR-23 Oka)
- Spike/Gil (Anti-tank)
- Sprint ABM
- SS-1 Scunner (NATO reporting name for the R-1)
- SS-1b Scud (NATO reporting name for the R-11 Zemlya)
- SS-1c Scud (NATO reporting name for the R-300 Elbrus)
- SS-2 Sibling (NATO reporting name for the R-2)
- SS-3 Shyster (NATO reporting name for the R-5 Pobeda)
- SS-4 Sandal (NATO reporting name for the R-12 Dvina)
- SS-5 Skean (NATO reporting name for the R-14 Chusovaya)
- SS-6 Sapwood (NATO reporting name for the R-7 Semyorka)
- SS-7 Saddler (NATO reporting name for the R-16)
- SS-8 Sasin (NATO reporting name for the R-9 Desna, also mistakenly applied to the R-26)
- SS-9 Scarp (NATO reporting name for the R-36)
- SS-10 Scrag (NATO reporting name for the UR-200)
- SS-11 Sego (NATO reporting name for the UR-100)
- SS-12 Scaleboard (NATO reporting name for the TR-1 Temp)
- SS-13 Savage (NATO reporting name for the RT-2)
- SS-14 Scamp (NATO reporting name for the RT-15)
- SS-15 Scrooge (NATO reporting name for the RT-20)
- SS-16 Sinner (NATO reporting name for the RT-21 Temp 2S)
- SS-17 Spanker (NATO reporting name for the MR-UR-100 Sotka)
- SS-18 Satan (NATO reporting name for the R-36M)
- SS-19 Stiletto (NATO reporting name for the UR-100N)
- SS-20 Saber (NATO reporting name for the RSD-10 Pioneer)
- SS-21 Scarab (NATO reporting name for the OTR-21 Tochka)
- SS-22 Scaleboard (NATO reporting name for the TR-1 Temp modified versions)
- SS-23 Spider (NATO reporting name for the OTR-23 Oka)
- SS-24 Scalpel (NATO reporting name for the RT-23 Molodets)
- SS-25 Sickle (NATO reporting name for the RT-2PM Topol)
- SS-26 Stone (NATO reporting name for the 9K720 Iskander)
- SS-27 Sickle B (NATO reporting name for the RT-2PM2 Topol-M)
- SS-28 Saber 2 (NATO reporting name for the RSD-10 Pioneer latest variant)
- SS-29 (NATO reporting name for the RS-24 Yars)
- SS-1000 (Brazil, retired)
- SSM-N-2 Triton (never built)
- SS-N-2 Styx
- SS-N-4 Sark (NATO reporting name for the R-13)
- SS-N-5 Serb (NATO reporting name for the R-21)
- SS-N-6 Serb (NATO reporting name for the R-27)
- SS-N-12 Sandbox (NATO reporting name for the P-500 Bazalt)
- SS-N-15 Starfish (NATO reporting name for the RPK-2 Vyuga)
- SS-N-16 Stallion (NATO reporting name for the RPK-6 Vodopad/RPK-7 Veter)
- SS-N-17 Snipe (NATO reporting name for the R-31/RSM-45)
- SS-N-19 Shipwreck (NATO reporting name for the P-700 Granit)
- SS-N-20 Sturgeon (NATO reporting name for the R-39 Rif)
- SS-N-22 Sunburn
- SS-N-27 Sizzler (NATO reporting name for the 3M-54 Klub)
- SS-X-10 Scrag (NATO reporting name for the Global Rocket 1)
- SS.10 surface-to-surface missile (France)
- SS.11 surface-to-surface / air-to-surface missile (France)
- SS.12 surface-to-surface missile (France)
- SSM-A-23 Dart
- Standoff Land Attack Missile
- Starstreak
- Storm Shadow
- Strela-1 (SA-9 Gaskin)
- Strela-2 (SA-7/SA-N-5 Grail)
- Super 530
- Swingfire

=== T ===
- Taimur (Pakistani ICBM)
- Taurus
- THAAD
- Terne ASW
- Temp (popular name for the TR-1 Temp)
- Temp 2S (popular name for the RT-21 Temp 2S)
- Thunderbird (surface-to-air missile for British Army use, built by English Electric)
- Tippu (Pakistani IRBM)
- TLVS (PAC-3 MSE, IRIS-T SL missiles) (Germano-American) land-based SHORAD/MRAD system
- Topol (popular name for the RT-2PM Topol and RT-2PM2 Topol-M)
- TOROS
- TR-1 Temp theatre ballistic missile (Russia; Cold War) (SS-12 / SS-22 Scaleboard)
- Trigat
- Trishul (Indian Surface-to-Air Missile)

=== U ===
- UGM-27 Polaris
- UGM-73 Poseidon
- UGM-89 Perseus
- UGM-96 Trident I
- UGM-133 Trident II
- Umkhonto
- UMTAS
- UR-100 intercontinental ballistic missile (Russia; Cold War) (NATO reporting name SS-11 Sego)
- UR-100MR (common alternate designation for the MR-UR-100 Sotka)
- UR-100N intercontinental ballistic missile (Russia; Cold War) (NATO reporting name SS-19 Stiletto)
- UR-200 intercontinental ballistic missile (Russia; Cold War) (NATO reporting name SS-X-10 Scrag)
- UUM-44 Subroc
- UUM-125 Sea Lance

=== V ===
- V-1
- V-2
- Vilkha
- Voevoda (popular name for the R-36M2)
- VL-SRSAM (Indian naval surface-to-air missile derived from Astra

=== W ===
- Wasserfall
- Wan Chien

=== X ===
- X-4

=== Y ===
- YJ-6
- YJ-7
- YJ-8
- YJ-12
- YJ-15
- YJ-17
- YJ-18
- YJ-19
- YJ-20
- YJ-21
- YJ-22
- YJ-62
- YJ-82
- YJ-83
- YJ-91
- Yun Feng

=== Z ===
- Zircon

== See also ==
- Comparison of orbital launch systems
- Lists of weapons
- List of missiles by country
- List of active missiles of the United States military
- List of orbital launch systems
- List of rocket aircraft
- List of sounding rockets
- List of military rockets
- List of upper stages
- List of artillery § Rockets
- Model rocket
- Intercontinental ballistic missile
- Expendable launch system
- NATO reporting name (has lists of various Soviet missiles)
