= Zlatoust Machine-Building Plant =

Subsidiary of Roscosmos

JSC Zlatoust Machine-Building Plant
- Native name: ОАО «Златоустовский машиностроительный завод»
- Type: Open joint-stock company
- Industry: Mechanical engineering
- Founded: 1939
- Headquarters: Zlatoust, Chelyabinsk Oblast, USSR → Russia
- Key people: Sergey Antonovich Lemeshevsky, general director
- Products: Ballistic missiles, Submarine-launched ballistic missiles, Firearms, Industrial equipment
- Parent: Roscosmos
- Website: zlatmash.ru

The JSC Zlatoust Machine-Building Plant (ZlatMash) is an arms manufacturing plant in Zlatoust, Chelyabinsk Oblast, Russia. It produced many of the Soviet Union's nuclear weapons, including the R-39 Submarine-launched ballistic missile.

The plant was founded in 1939 for the production of small arms. Today, in addition to small arms, it produces industrial equipment and medical supplies. Since 2009 ZlatMash is a part of State Corporation for Space Activities "Roscosmos".

== History ==
It was established in 1938 as a small arms factory.

In May 1938, the first government's decision to build the plant was made. After a thorough analysis, eleven planned sites for future construction were selected, including the Urzhum site, 12 kilometers from Zlatoust.

In November 1941, the equipment and specialists from the Tula Arms Plant and the Podolsk Mechanical Plant were evacuated to the enterprise. With their arrival, the production of the Maxim gun and the Volkov-Yartsev aviation cannon began. Further, the plant produced the Tokarev self-loading rifle, the Berezin machine gun, the Shpagin submachine gun, and the Degtyarev anti-tank rifle.

The workers of the plant initiated fundraising for the creation of a tank column named after the 25th anniversary of the Great October Revolution. In a short time, 3.5 million rubles were collected, 450 thousand rubles were collected for gifts to the soldiers of the Red Army, and 1 million and 200 thousand rubles were collected for the creation of the Ural Volunteer Tank Corps.

In June 1942, the first factory workers were awarded orders and medals. In 1944, 81 people were awarded the medal "For the Defense of Moscow," and more than five thousand factory workers after the victory were awarded the medal "For Valiant Labor in the Great Patriotic War of 1941-1945."

=== Rocket production ===
In December 1947, a decision was made to establish SKB No. 385 as part of the plant, later the Mechanical Engineering Design Bureau, and now the JSC "State Missile Center named after Academician V.P. Makeev" (see Makeyev Rocket Design Bureau), and in 1953, the production of tactical missiles 8A61 and 8K11 (R-11 and R-11M) began according to the OKB-1 documentation, headed by S.P.Korolev.

In 1959, the first ballistic missile of the submarine R-11FM developed by OKB-1 was put into service with the navy. In 1963, testing was completed, and the first ballistic missile for submarines with an underwater launch, the R-21, was put into service with the Navy.

In 1967, for the first time in the world, an R-27 liquid-propellant rocket was filled at the manufacturing plant, and an ampoule was sent from the plant, for which a detached ampulization-filling complex (a chemical plant) was specially built. In 1974, the R-27U SLBM with a multiple warhead of the dispersing type was put into service. In the future, all ballistic missiles that are or were in service with the navy were manufactured and underwent experimental design testing at the Zlatoust Machine-Building Plant.

The enterprise took part in well-known space programs. Manufactured brake propulsion systems for the Vostok, Voskhod, and Soyuz spacecraft (1961-1980), components and assemblies for the "Buran programme" complex (1983-1988), rigging and non-standardized equipment for the launch complex "Baikonur" (1983-1988).

In the 1960s, the plant completely reoriented itself to the production of rockets and space technology. It became the main base enterprise for the production of rocket technology, developed by the JSC "Design Bureau named after Academician V. P. Makeev." In 1960, the first production buildings of facility No. 3 were put into operation in the city of Miass, where hull production was organized (since 1992, the Miass Machine-Building Plant).
