= R15 =

R15, R-15, or similar, may refer to:

== Automobiles ==
- Audi R15 TDI, a Le Mans prototype racing car
- Renault 15, a French car
- Yamaha YZF-R15, a motorcycle sold in India and Colombia

== Aviation ==
- Rubik R-15 Koma, a Hungarian training glider
- Romano R.15, a French amphibious aircraft
- Tumansky R-15, a turbojet engine

== Roads ==
- Jalan Wang Kelian, in Malaysia
- R-15 regional road (Montenegro)

== Vessels ==
- HMS Cavendish (R15), a destroyer of the Royal Navy
- HMS Colossus (R15), an aircraft carrier of the Royal Navy
- USS R-15 (SS-92), a submarine of the United States Navy

== Other uses ==
- R-15 (novel series), a 2009 Japanese novel series by Hiroyuki Fushimi and Takuya Fujima
- R-15 (concert), a 2001 music concert by Filipina singer Regine Velasquez
- R-15 (missile), a Soviet submarine-launched ballistic missile
- R15 (Rodalies de Catalunya), a regional rail line in Catalonia, Spain
- R15 (New York City Subway car), a subway car built in 1950
- Emblem of the East, an Egyptian hieroglyph
- Oppo R15 Pro, a smartphone
- The main body-type in the videogame website Roblox
- R15: Contact with water liberates extremely flammable gases, a risk phrase
- Ring chromosome 15
