= RT-1 =

- Type: Intercontinental ballistic missile
- Place of origin: USSR

Specifications
- Mass: 35,500 kg (78,300 lb)
- Length: 18.3 m (60 ft)
- Diameter: 2 m (6 ft 7 in)
- Warhead: 600–1000 kt nuclear warhead

The RT-1 was an early intercontinental ballistic missile design that was tested but not deployed by the Soviet Union during the Cold War. It was not assigned a NATO reporting name, but did carry the GRAU index 8K95.

Development was led by OKB-1 (S. P. Korolev), and a total of nine flight tests were carried out, of which the two first failed, with the last launch taking place in June 1963. Two versions of the RT-1 were developed, with the first failing its first flight, but succeeding in its second in 1961. A second version was tested in 1965 with three flights, of which two failed. The RT-1 program was cancelled before any service.

== Operators ==
Soviet Union
The Strategic Rocket Forces were to operate the RT-1, but the program was cancelled before service entry.

== See also ==
- List of missiles
- List of rockets
