= RT-2 =

RT-2 SS-13 Savage
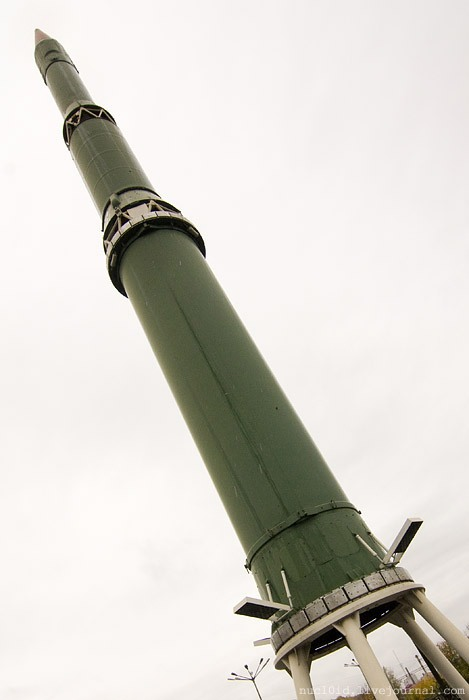
- Type: Intercontinental ballistic missile
- Place of origin: Soviet Union

Service history
- In service: 1968-1976
- Used by: Soviet Strategic Rocket Forces

Specifications
- Mass: 45,100 kg (99,400 lb)
- Length: 21.5 m (71 ft)
- Diameter: 1.7 m (5 ft 7 in)
- Engine: Three-stage solid propellant
- Operational range: 10,000 km
- Guidance system: autonomous inertial guidance
- Accuracy: Maximum error: 4 km, CEP: 1900 m,
- Launch platform: silo-based

The RT-2 was an intercontinental ballistic missile deployed by the Soviet Union, which was in service from December 1968 until 1976. It was assigned the NATO reporting name SS-13 Savage and carried the GRAU index 8K98. Designed by OKB-1, about 60 were built by 1972.

== History ==
The RT-2 was the first solid-propellant ICBM in Soviet service, and was a development of the earlier RT-1 series. It was a three-stage inertially-guided missile comparable to the American Minuteman missile. It was armed with a single 600 kiloton warhead and was silo-launched, although a rail-based version was contemplated by Soviet planners. It was deployed in the Yoshkar-Ola missile field.

The Soviets used the two upper stages of the RT-2 to develop the RT-15 mobile IRBM system. The RT-2PM Topol is supposedly a modernized version of the RT-2

== Operations ==
The RT-2 was capable of delivering a 540 kg (1,200 lb) class payload to a maximum operational range of approximately 10,000 km (5,500 nautical miles)

=== Command and Control ===
A single launch control center (LCC) monitored numbers of launchers. The hardened and dispersed silo concept increased system survivability and provided steady environmental controls from the solid-propellant motors. Headquarters RVSN exercised normal control of the RT-2 missile force, through an intermediate RVSN Army and launch complex headquarters (HCC). A launch complex consisted of an HCC and several LCCs, monitoring numerous underground launchers.

== Flight test history ==
=== Test Launches ===
RT-2 Test Launches
Date	System	Location	Range (NM)	Note
26 Feb 1966	RT-2 Mod	Kapustin Yar

== General Characteristics ==
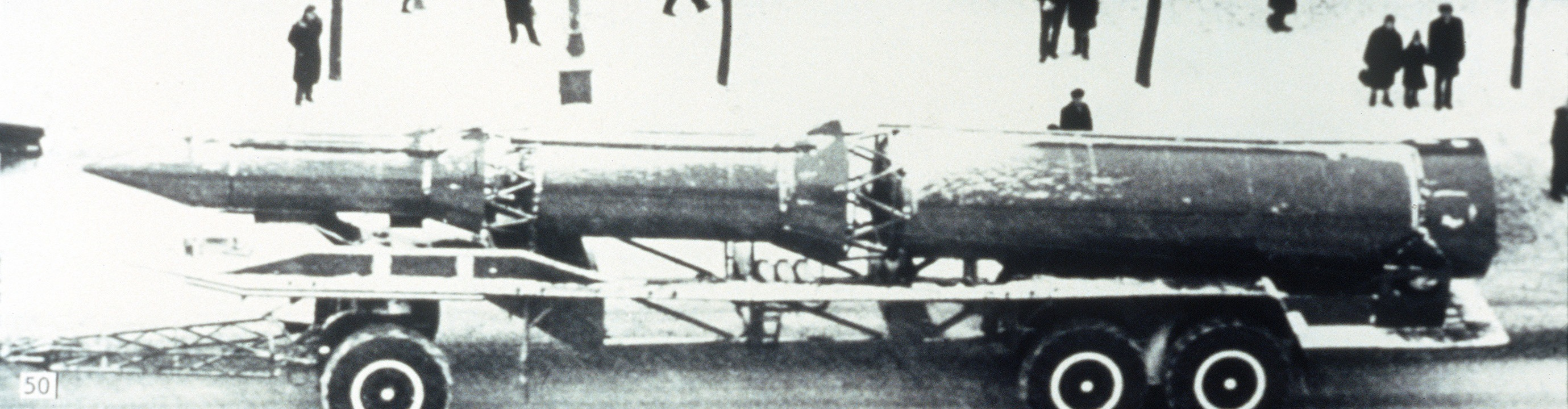
An RT-2

- Length: 20,000 mm (65.6 ft)
- Diameter: 1,700 mm (5.57 ft)
- Launch Weight: 34,000 kg (33.46 tons)
- Guidance: inertial guidance
- Propulsion: solid, three-stage
- Warhead: 600kt nuclear
- Range: 6,200 mi (10,000 km)

== Operators ==
Soviet Union
The Strategic Rocket Forces were the only operator of the RT-2.

== Photo gallery ==
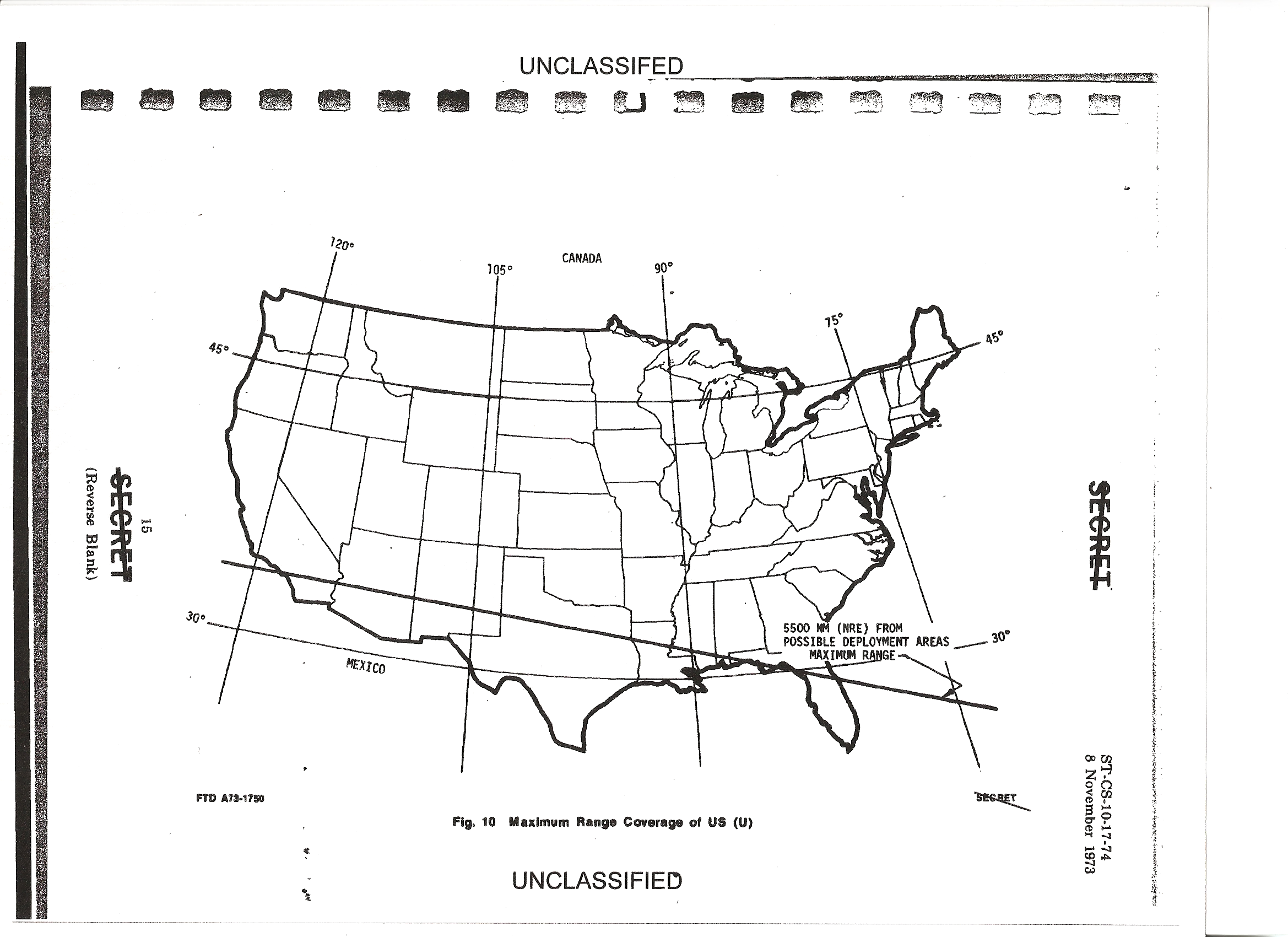
RT-2 coverage of United States

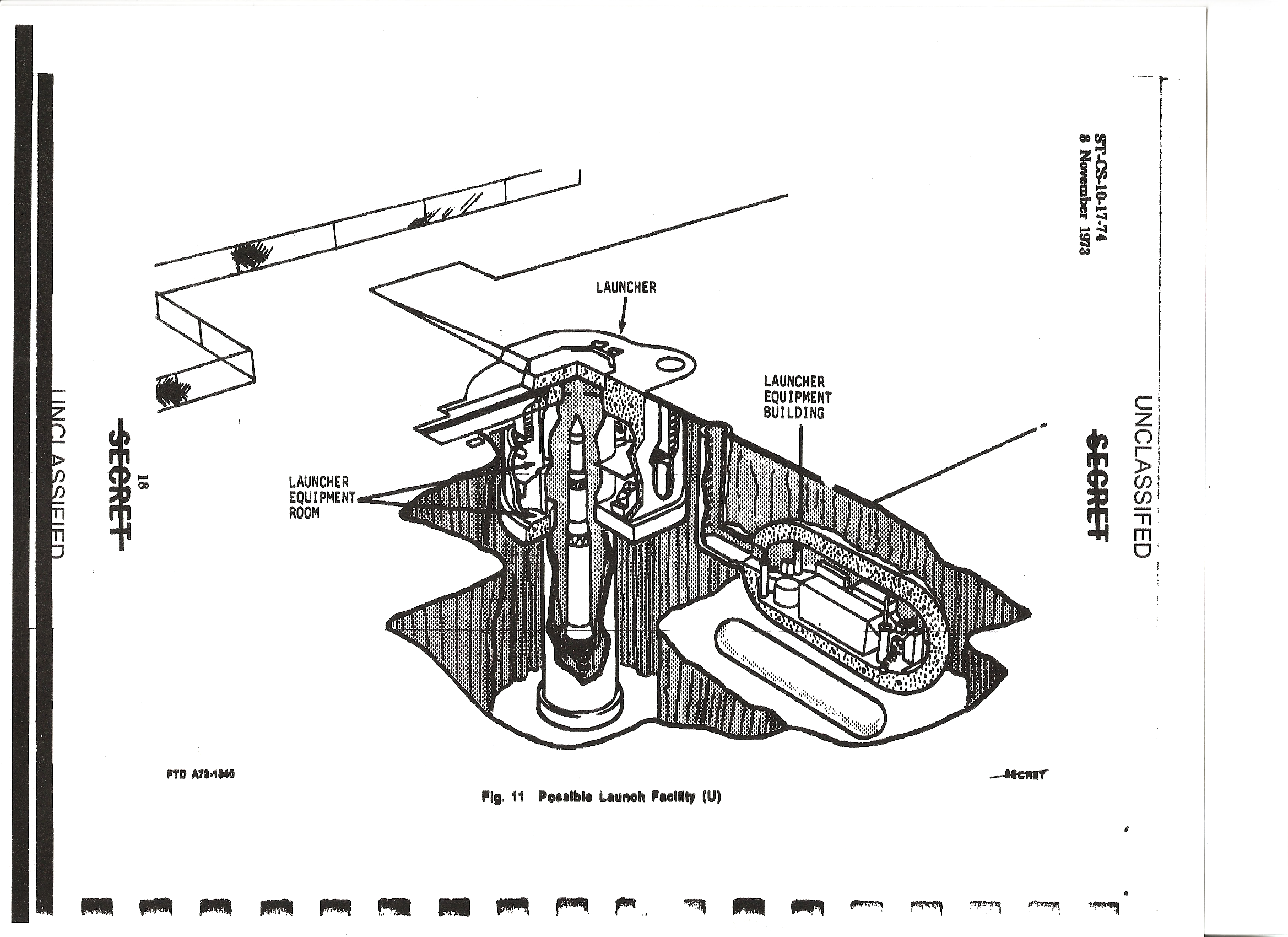
RT-2 launch facility configuration

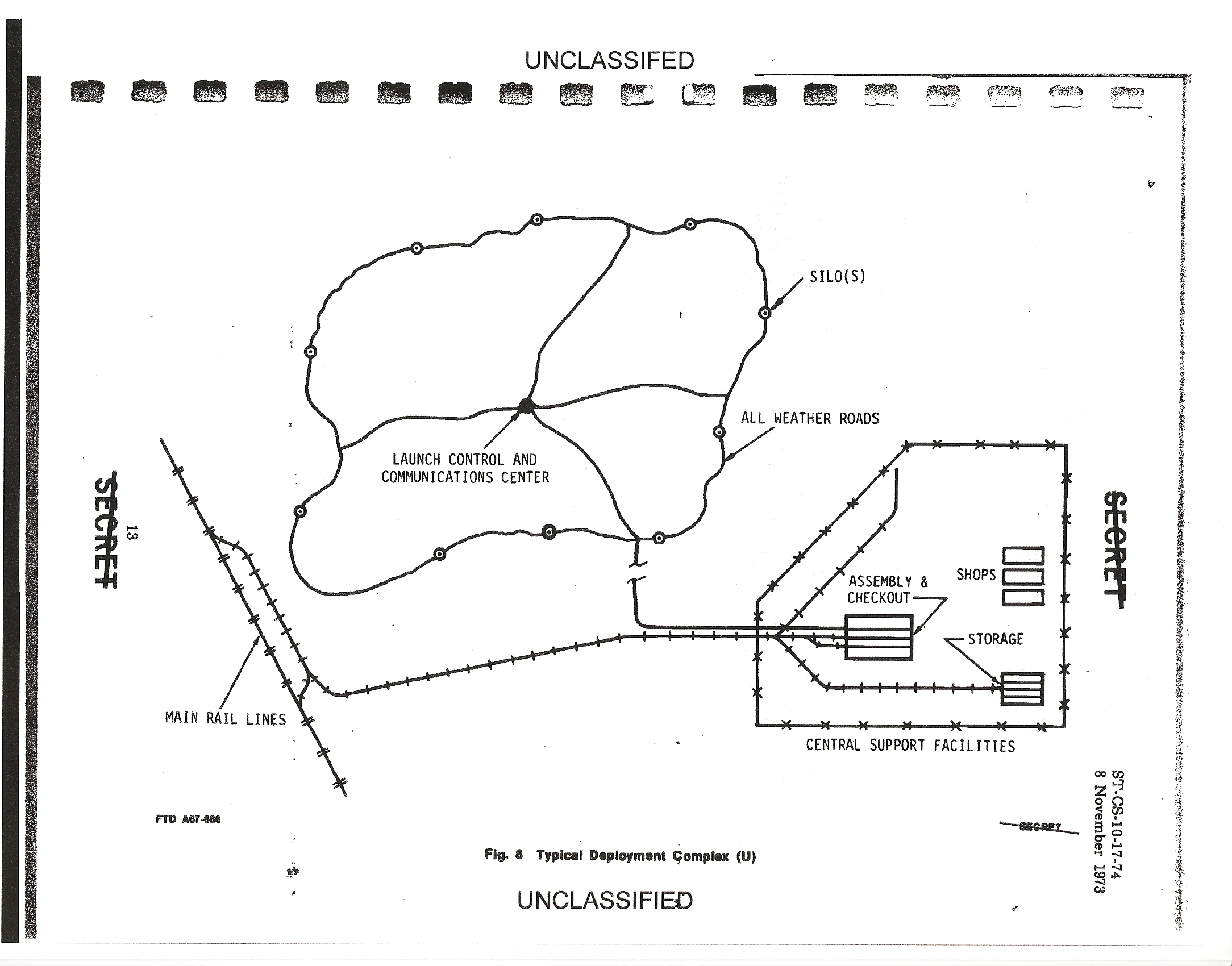
RT-2 missile complex configuration

== See also ==
- RT-2PM Topol
- List of missiles
- List of rockets
