= R-46 (missile) =

The R-46 was an intercontinental ballistic missile (ICBM) design by SDO Yuzhnoye (OKB-586) for the Soviet Union during the Cold War.

The R-46 design was part of a concept to launch a very large hydrogen bomb into orbit as a fractional orbital bombardment system (FOBS). The existence of the system was alluded to in a speech by then Soviet Premier Nikita Khrushchev in August 1961. The design was not developed, however, being officially terminated in June 1964. The FOBS concept was abandoned as part of SALT II.

== See also ==
- 8K69, the first Soviet fractional orbital bombardment system
- List of missiles
- List of rockets
