= Makeyev Rocket Design Bureau =

Russian missile design company

Coordinates: 55.112°N 60.140°E

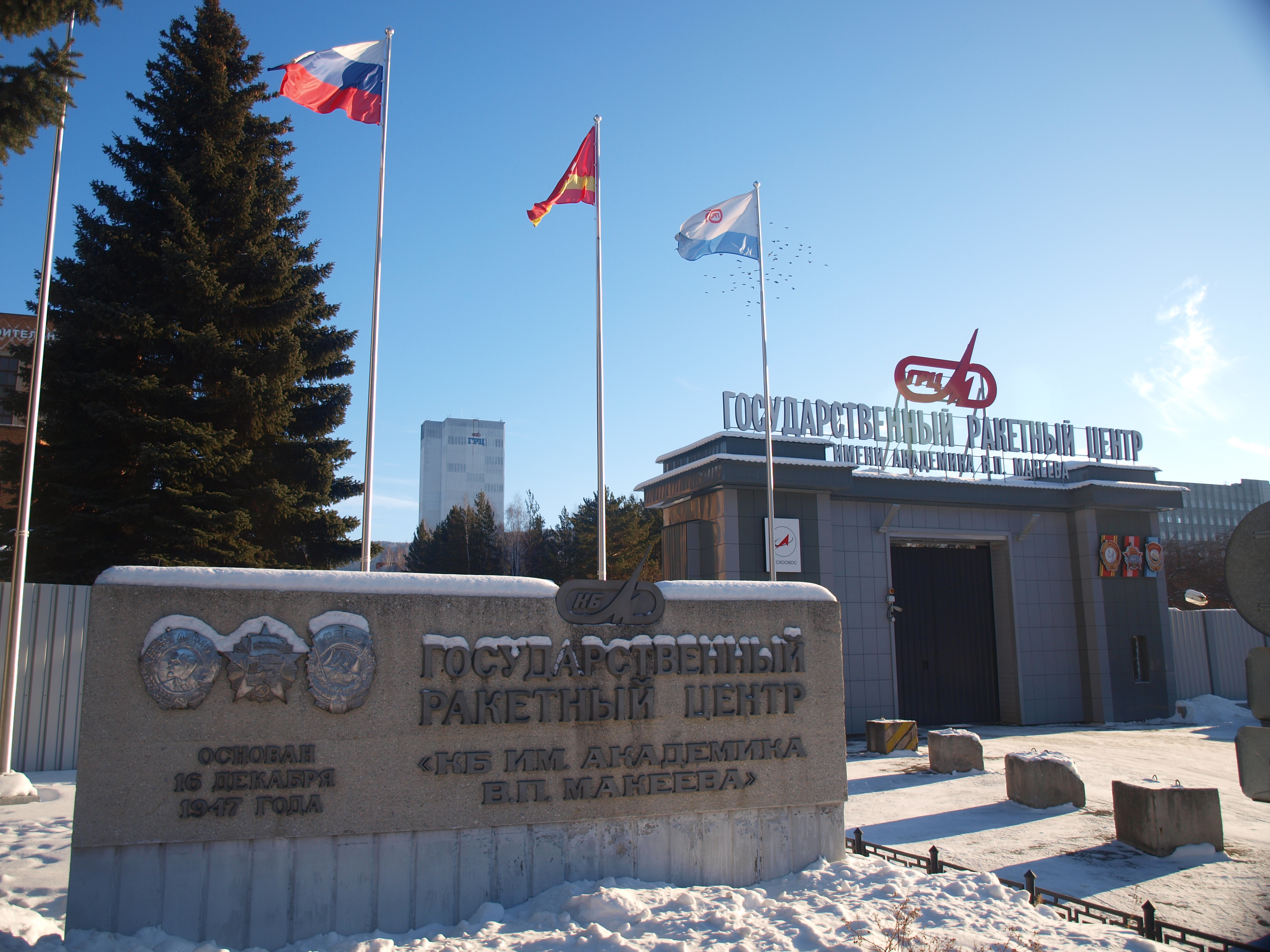
- Company type: Joint-stock company
- Industry: Arms industry Aerospace industry Space industry
- Founded: 1947
- Headquarters: Miass, Russia
- Products: Ballistic missiles, Submarine-launched ballistic missiles, Launch vehicles
- Parent: Roscosmos
- Website: makeyev.ru

The JSC Makeyev Design Bureau (Russian: ГРЦ Макеева; also known as Makeyev OKB) is a Russian missile design company located in Miass, Russia.

Established in December 1947 as SKB-385 in Zlatoust (see Zlatoust Machine-Building Plant), the company was the main designer of submarine-launched ballistic missiles (SLBM) in Russia. In 1955, the company was moved to Miass. In 1965, SKB-385 was redesignated the Design Bureau of Machine-Building (KBM) under the Ministry of General Machine-Building. In 1993, the organization was posthumously renamed in honor of Victor Makeyev, who had been the Chief Designer of SKB-385. Its full official name is State Rocket Center «Academician V.P. Makeev Design Bureau».

== Rockets and missiles ==
- R-11 Zemlya
- R-13 (missile)
- R-17 Elbrus
- R-21 (missile)
- Shtil'
- Volna
- R-27 Zyb
- R-29 Vysota
- R-29RM Shtil
- R-29RMU Sineva
- R-29RMU2 Layner
- R-39 Rif
- RS-28 Sarmat
- CORONA
- ROSSIYANKA
