= AGM-153 =

Abandoned air-to-surface missile

The AGM-153 was a missile considered for development by the United States.

== Overview ==
The AGM-153 was proposed in 1992 as a new tactical air-to-surface missile. The weapon was to be launched from high and low altitudes against both fixed and mobile targets ranging from bunkers to armoured vehicles. Modular construction was chosen to allow different types of warhead and seeker head to be selected. A two way data link would allow the weapon to be locked on after launch, and controlled all the way to the target.

The designations XAGM-153A and XAGM-153B were assigned; the A model was to have a hard target penetrating warhead, the B model a blast-fragmentation warhead - both warheads would have been in the region of 360 kg (800 lb). To distinguish between seeker heads a number suffix was also mooted, with -1 missiles having a TV unit in the nose and -2 missiles an imaging infra-red system, but this was not adopted formally.

It was planned to operate the missile initially from the F-16 Fighting Falcon and B-1 Lancer aircraft.

Viability studies of the AGM-153 led to the cancellation of the project at an early stage. No final design was settled on and no hardware was produced prior to cancellation. Reasons for the cancellation have not been formally announced, but it is notable that the proposed AGM-153 would have a very similar warhead and guidance package to the AGM-142 Have Nap, and it is possible that the Air Force simply saw no reason to produce a missile that offered nothing new.

== See also ==
- List of missiles
