= R-26 (missile) =

- Type: Intercontinental ballistic missile
- Place of origin: Soviet Union

Production history
- Designed: 1960-1961

Specifications
- Mass: 87,000 kg (192,000 lb)
- Propellant: Liquid fuel
- Operational range: 12,000 kilometres (6,500 nmi)
- Accuracy: CEP 2,000 metres (6,600 ft)

The R-26 was a second-generation intercontinental ballistic missile (ICBM) designed but not deployed by the Soviet Union during the Cold War. Its control system was designed at NPO "Electropribor" (Kharkov, Ukrainian SSR). The missile was mistakenly identified as an R-9 Desna and given the NATO reporting name SS-8 Sasin. Within the Soviet Union, it carried the GRAU index 8K66.

== Development ==
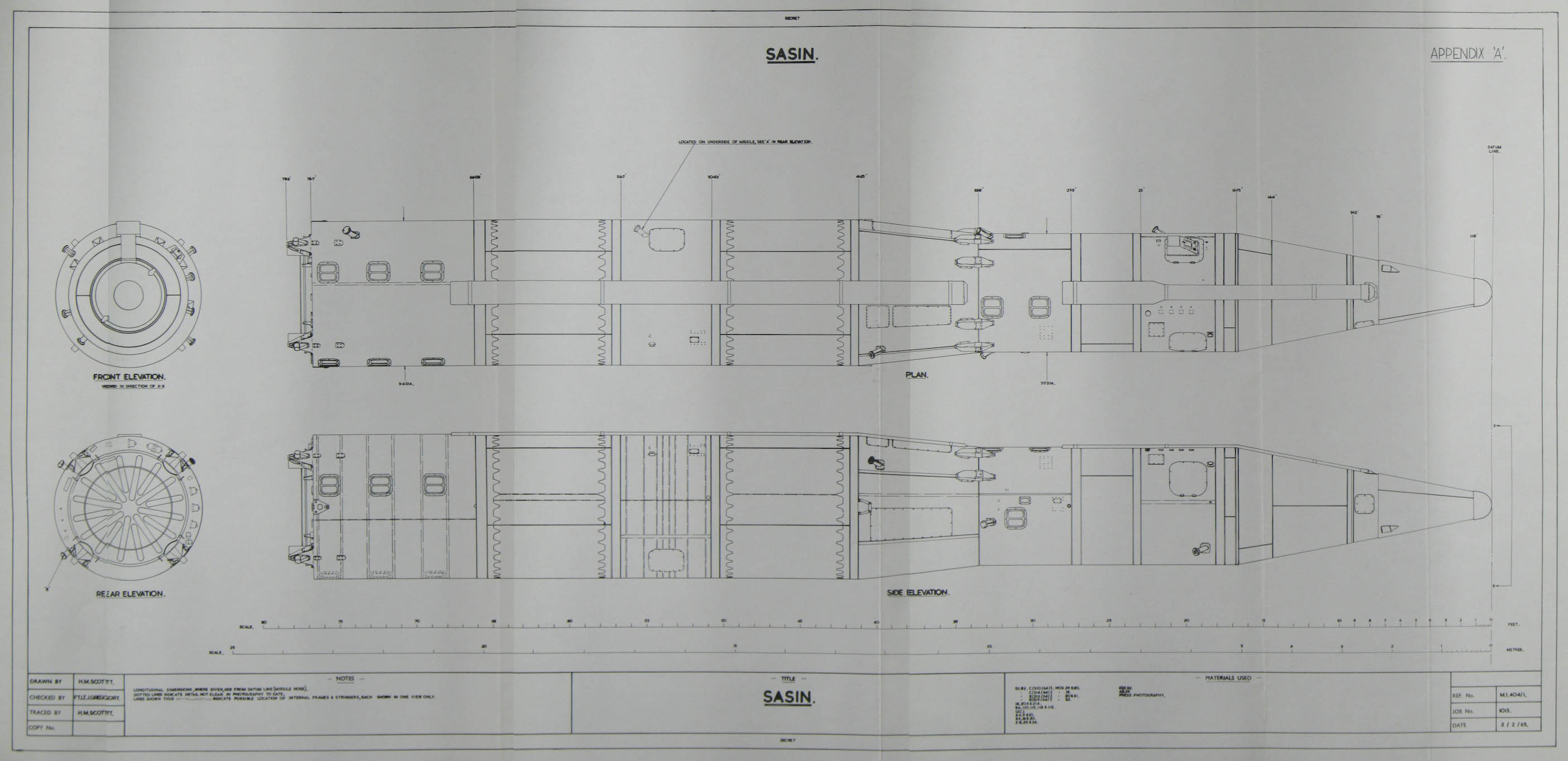
Drawing made by the UK Defence Intelligence from observations and photographs made in a Red Square Military Parade 1964

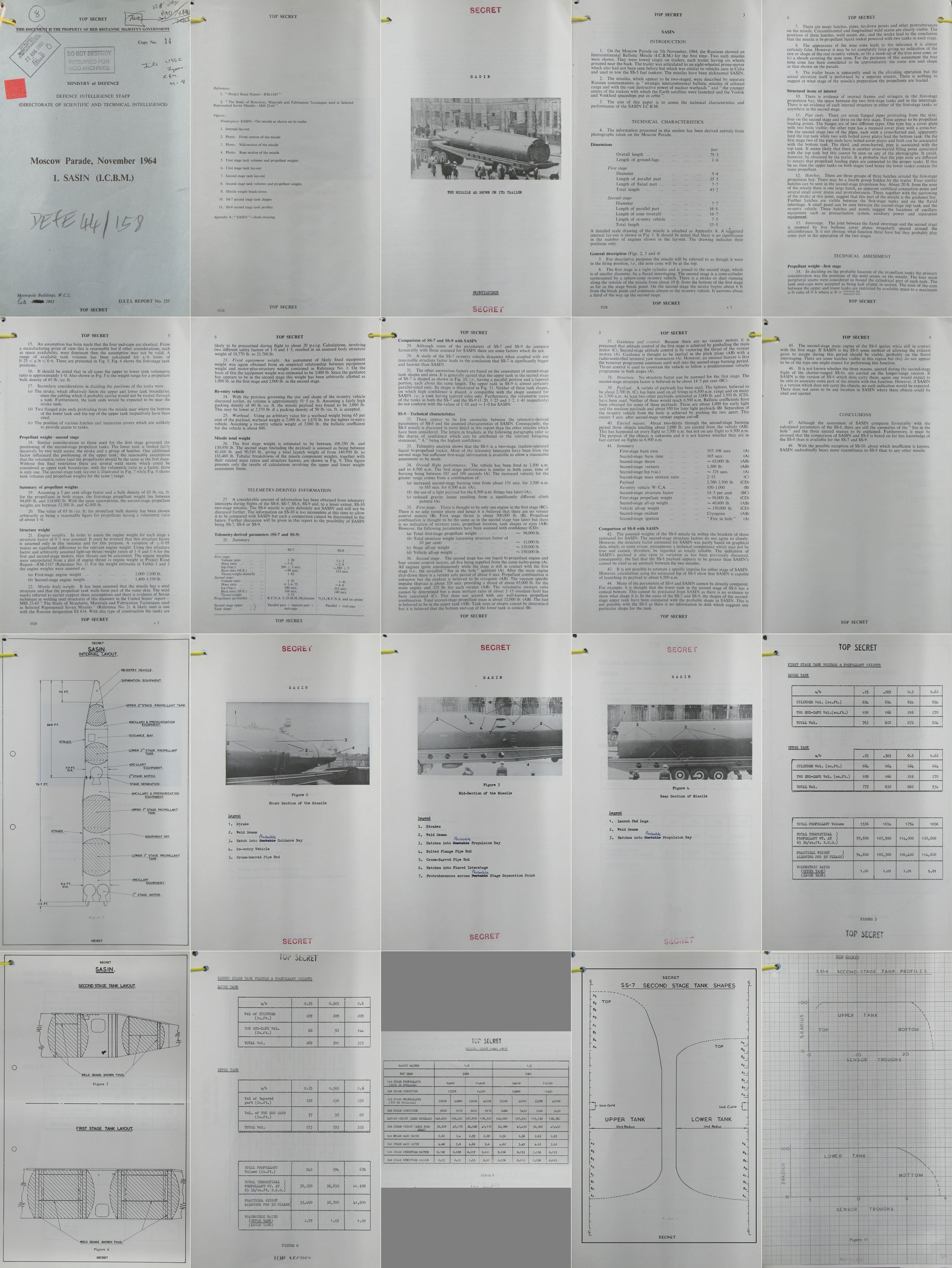
Montage of a UK Defence Intelligence assessment of the R-26 ICBM.

Design of the R-26 was initiated to develop a light liquid propellant powered ICBM. Designs received approval in 1960, but prior to flight tests were cancelled by the government in 1962.

The missile was revealed during a Red Square parade in November 1964, where it was misidentified as an R-9 Desna. However, the program had already been cancelled and the error was not rectified.

== Operators ==
Soviet Union
The Strategic Rocket Forces were to be the only operator of the R-26, but it was cancelled before entry into service.

== See also ==
- List of missiles
