= Khartron =

Aerospace and missile manufacturer in Kharkiv, Ukraine

Coordinates: 50.0461°N 36.2846°E

HARTRON Corp.
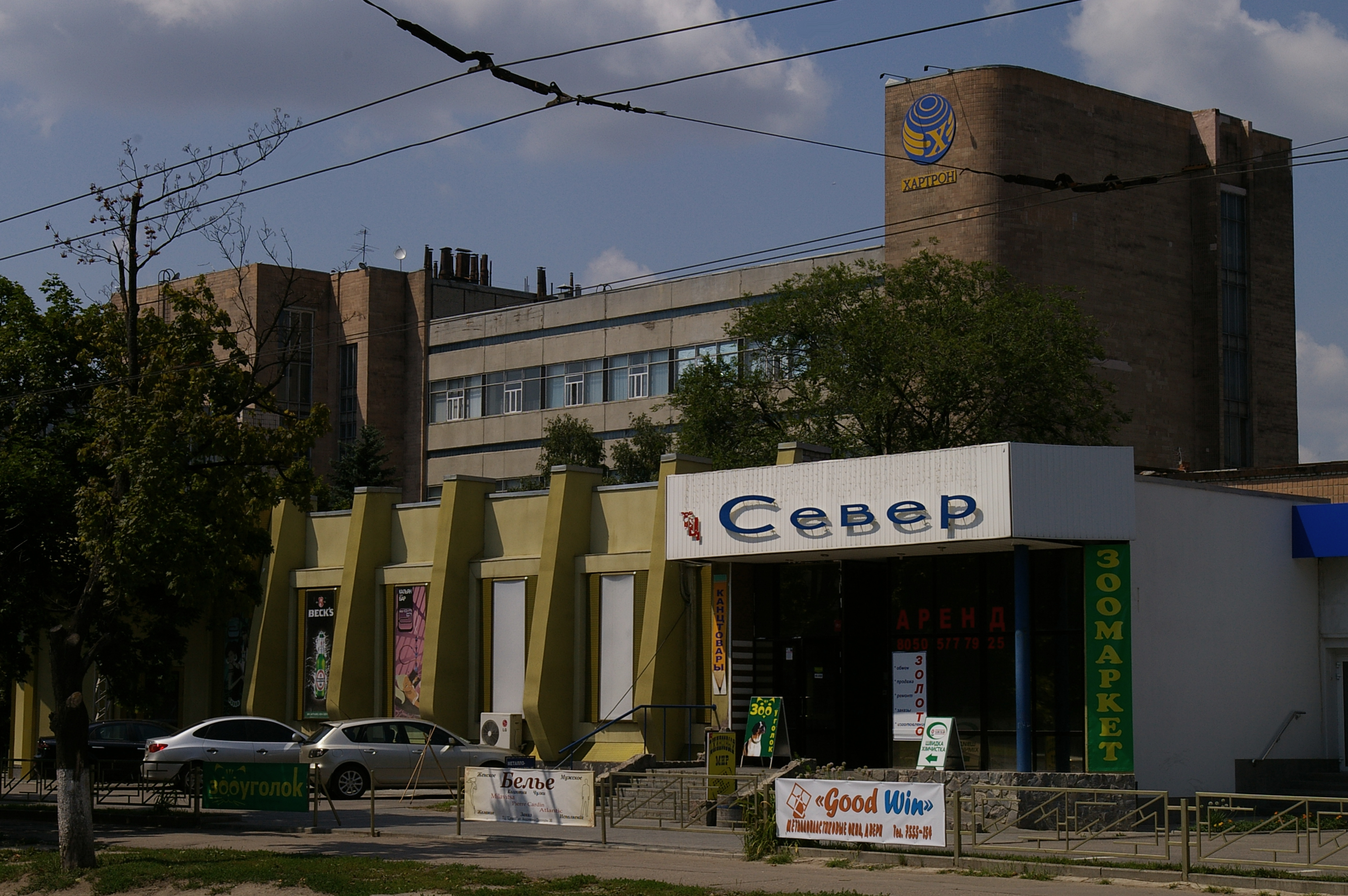
- Company type: Public
- Industry: spacecraft control systems, electronics
- Founded: 1959
- Headquarters: Kharkiv, Ukraine
- Key people: Mykola Vakhno, President & CEO
- Website: www.hartron.com.ua

JSC "Khartron" (Hartron) (Ukrainian: Хартрон, formerly NPO "Electropribor", Russian: НПО "Электроприбор", meaning Scientific Production Association "Electrical device"; originally known as NII-692 or OKB-692 design bureau; afterwards known as KB electropriborostroeniya before being named NPO Electropribor) is one of the leading design engineering bureaus in Ukraine, which develops and produces spacecraft and missile control systems.

== History and achievements ==
Khartron Corp. was established in 1959 in Kharkiv, Ukrainian Soviet Socialist Republic. Founded as a government enterprise, Khartron Corp. changed its names several times, albeit remaining an intact entity. The main trend of its activity was development and implementation of control systems for ballistic missiles, carrier-boosters and space vehicles. It is Khartron that developed control systems for the formidable missiles SS-18 and SS-19, for the all scientific and technical modules of the MIR Space Station, and for the Zarya cargo module of the International Space Station. It was the main developer enterprise of the Energia rocket. Khartron is the only company in the world that provides automatic docking of the heavy 20-tons space vehicles in space environment.

Under a radically changing economic environment, Khartron Corp. has had to adapt to civilian applications, thus executing the Government conversion Program. SS-18 and SS-19 were converted into space launchers Dnepr and Eurokot to orbit Ukrainian and foreign satellites. Khartron boasts several joint ventures and projects with companies in the USA, Germany, Italy, Russia, providing successful launches of commercial satellites.

In 1994, a joint venture between Westinghouse Electric Company and Khartron - Westron - was established. Westron JV has been successfully operating from its inception to this day modernizing I&C systems for Ukrainian nuclear power plants. During his trip to Europe to Ukraine in June 2000, U.S. President Bill Clinton noted the importance of this particular cooperative effort to improve the safety of Ukraine's nuclear power plants.

== Current state ==
Khartron is one of Ukraine's enterprises for reconstruction of Instrumentation and Control (I&C) systems for Ukrainian nuclear power plants.

Today's Khartron is a mini-conglomerate; parent of several partially owned subsidiary enterprises involved in their own businesses. Meeting the requirements of the national economy, Khartron's business segments range from control systems for fossil-fuel power plants to gas and oil pipelines to sugar plants to air traffic to agriculture to railroad stations and cars.

Over ten years, Khartron has moved from an exclusively state-owned enterprise, to a joint stock company, whose products among others include commercial industrial control systems for fossil-fuel and nuclear power plants, transport, gas and oil pipelines.

Eight people died (and twenty-two were rescued) in a fire at the Khartron plant in Kharkiv on 8 January 2014.

== Departments ==
- "Khartron-incorporated" (company that manages the fast-growing businesses, targeted at corporate consumers of products and services) - Official site
- "HARTRON-ARKOS" (design, development, manufacturing, testing, installation and maintenance of the various (primarily - spacecraft) control systems) - Official site
- "HARTRON-PLANT" (manufacturing of the control system hardware for rocket complexes and space vehicles, hardware for nuclear power plants, consumer goods (radio-controlled toys, welder's helmets), etc.) - Page
- "HARTRON-UKOM" (design, development, manufacturing, delivery, installation and maintenance of various telemetric, space control systems, gas/oil pipelines and pipeline-related facilities electronic support, etc.) - Page
- "HARTRON-INCOR" (design, development, manufacturing, installation and maintenance of the nuclear power plants electronic support, protection hardware for power units, power stations, computer-based turnstile systems for passengers at the railway stations, electronic table-based visual information systems for railway stations, etc.) - Page
- "HARTRON-ENERGO" (design, development, manufacturing, installation and maintenance of the radioelectronic hardware for control systems for nuclear and fossil-fuel power plants, gas analysers, hybrid microelectronic assembly) - Page
- "HARTRON-CONSAT" (design, development, manufacturing, installation and maintenance of the guidance and orientation control systems for space vehicles, I&C systems for industrial enterprises, control systems for onboard digital computer complexes, satellite components, etc.) - Page
- "ELON-TT" (design, development, manufacturing, installation and maintenance of the Instrumentation & Control systems for iron and steel industry, coke industry, gas & oil transportation) - Page
- "HARTRON-EXPRESS" (design, development, manufacturing, installation and maintenance of the electric equipment for railway transport, fire-alarm systems, computer-aided diagnostic control systems for industrial conditioners) - Page
- "HARTRON-SIGMA" (testing of electronic and electrotechnical products, Testing & Sertification Center's service, Electrotechnical laboratory's service) - Page

== Products ==
Designed control systems for:

Rockets:

- Energia
- Tsyklon
- Tsyklon-4
- Strela
- SS-7 'Saddler'
- SS-8 'Sasin'
- SS-9 'Scarp'
- SS-15 'Scrooge'
- SS-18 'Satan'/Dnepr
- SS-19 'Stiletto'

Orbital modules:

- Kvant-1
- Kvant-2
- Kristall
- Priroda
- Spektr

Satellites:

- more than 150 satellites of the Kosmos series

== Project Leaders ==
During the period of Khartron, there were a number of leaders. Among them were Borys Konoplov (also Boris Konoplev), Volodymyr Serheiev, Anatolii Andriushchenko, Andriushchenko, Mykola Vakhno.
