= R-21 (missile) =

R-21 (NATO reporting name: SS-N-5 'Sark'/'Serb')
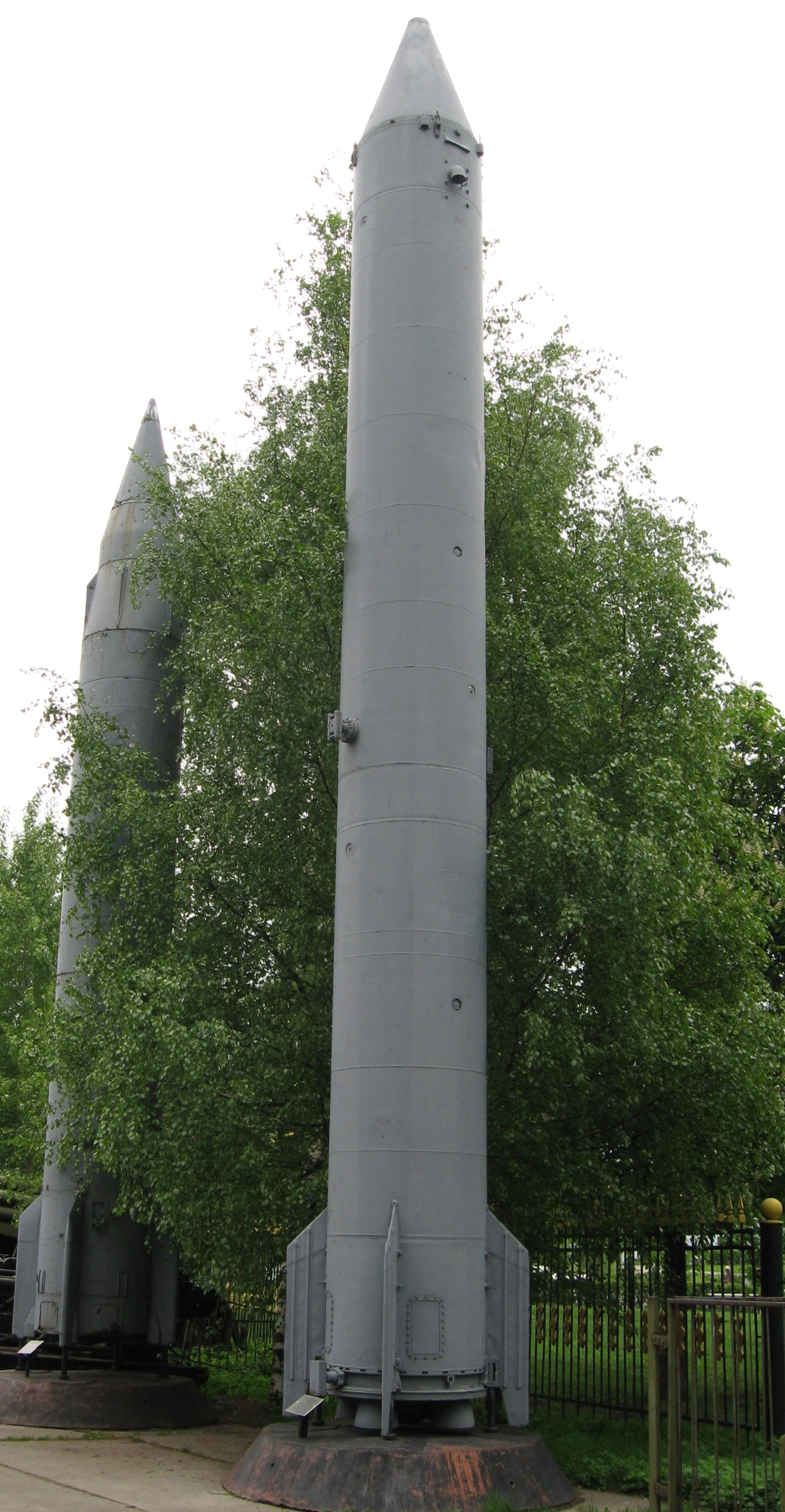
- Type: Submarine-launched ballistic missile
- Place of origin: Soviet Union

Service history
- In service: 15 May 1963–1991
- Used by: Soviet Union

Production history
- Designer: Makeyev Rocket Design Bureau

Specifications
- Mass: 16.5 t (16.2 long tons; 18.2 short tons)
- Length: 13.0 m (42 ft 8 in)
- Diameter: 1.2 m (47 in)
- Warhead: single nuclear
- Blast yield: 800kt or 1Mt
- Engine: liquid-fuel rocket, single stage
- Operational range: 1,300 km (700 nmi) upgraded to 1,650 km (890 nmi)
- Guidance system: inertial
- Accuracy: 2.8 km CEP
- Launch platform: Golf II-class, Hotel II-class submarines

The R-21 (Russian: Р-21; NATO: SS-N-5 'Sark/Serb'; GRAU: 4K55) was a submarine-launched ballistic missile in service with the Soviet Union between 1963 and 1989. It was the first Soviet nuclear missile that could be launched from a submerged submarine, and also had twice the range of earlier missiles. It replaced the R-11FM and R-13 (SS-N-4) on many Golf and Hotel-class submarines, and was in turn superseded by the R-27 (SS-N-6 'Serb') missile carried by Yankee-class submarines.

== Development ==
Development of the R-15 and R-21 was initially assigned to Mikhail Yangel's Yuzhnoye Design Office (OKB-586) on 20 March 1958. The project was transferred to Viktor Makeyev's SKB-385 on 17 March 1959. It was intended for the Golf-class submarines (Project 629B); the complete missile system was called the D-4 weapon complex.

The 4th Research Institute had been conducting trials of underwater missile launch systems since 1955 with modified Scuds but the first successful launch was in 1960 and the first flight of a standard R-21 was in 1962. Over the lifetime of the missile, 193 out of 228 launches were successful.

The R-21 was probably the basis for the design of the North Korean Hwasong-7 (No Dong) missile.

== Design ==
Unlike Western designs, the R-21 used a cold launch solid rocket to eject the missile from the flooded launch tube before the main motor ignited. This allowed missiles to be launched in a water depth of 40-60 m. The propulsion system used an Inhibited red fuming nitric acid-amine propellants combination, AK-27I/TG-02. The AK-27I oxidizer was a mixture of 73% nitric acid, 27% nitrogen tetroxide, and an iodine inhibitory passivant. The fuel was originally used in the Wasserfall rocket under the name TONKA-250 and consisted of 50% triethylamine and 50% xylidine. This gave the R-21 a range of 1,400 km (760 nmi), double that of first-generation sub-launched missiles. The Naval Institute Guide suggests that the range was initially 1,300 km, and extended to 1,650 km later in the life of the missile. There was a single warhead of approximately 800 kilotons.

== Variants ==
- R-21 (4K55) - original design
- R-21A (4K55A) - subsequent modification

There was some confusion about the SS-N-4/5/6 series of missiles in the West, as the SS-N-5 is normally given the NATO reporting name 'Sark' like the SS-N-4 first carried by the Golf submarines, but some variants were assigned the name 'Serb' typically used for the SS-N-6. Jane's uses 'Sark'.

== Operational history ==
The missiles replaced first-generation R-11FM and R-13 missiles on some Golf (Project 629) and Hotel (Project 658) class SSBNs, with three missiles per submarine, between 1963 and 1967. They were succeeded from 1967 by Yankee-class submarines carrying 2,400 km-range R-27 (SS-N-6 'Serb') missiles. Seven of the eight Hotel I (Project 658) subs were upgraded to Hotel II (Project 658M) standard, which were retired by 1991.

== Operators ==
North Korea

- North Korean Navy

Soviet Union

- Soviet Navy

== See also ==
- UGM-27 Polaris - the first US ballistic missile that could be launched from a submerged submarine
