= Viktor Makeyev =

Sowjet rocket scientist

- Виктор Макеев
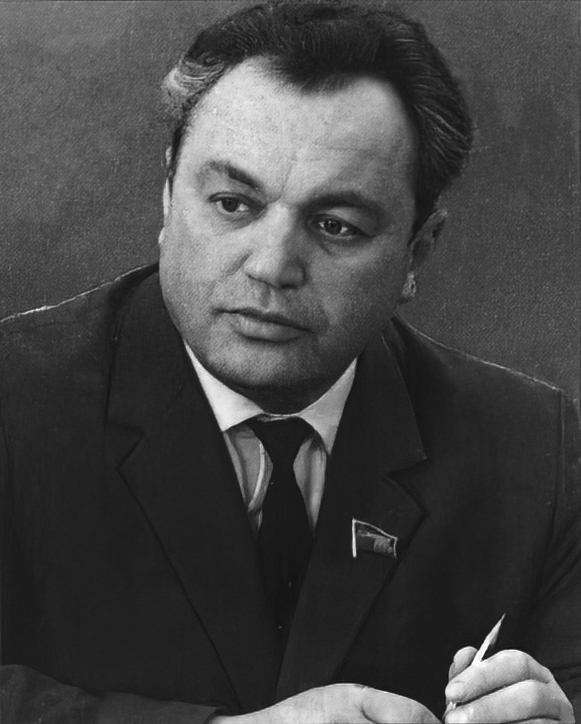
- V. P. Makeyev (1924–85)
- Born: 25 October 1924; Protopopovo, Kolomna District, Moscow Governorate, Russian SFSR, Soviet Union (now Kolomna, Moscow Oblast, Russia)
- Died: 25 October 1985 (aged 61); Moscow, Russian SFSR, Soviet Union
- Resting place: Novodevichy Cemetery
- Education: Moscow Aviation Institute
- Awards: Hero of Socialist Labor (2); Order of Lenin (5); USSR State Prize (3)
- Engineering career
- Discipline: Engineering (mechanics)
- Projects: Space Race

Viktor Petrovich Makeyev (also Makeev; Russian: Ви́ктор Петро́вич Маке́ев; 25 October 1924 – 25 October 1985) was a Soviet engineer in the Soviet space program who was also a central and founding figure in development of Submarine-launched ballistic missile (SLBM) for the Soviet Navy.

== Biography ==
Born on October 25, 1924 in the village of Protopopovo (now the Kirovsky district of the city of Kolomna).

Since 1939 he worked at an aircraft plant in Moscow, and since 1941 in evacuation in Kazan as a draftsman and designer. He demonstrated the ability to skillfully solve design problems in the conditions of intense serial production of Pe-2 aircraft. Studied at the evening department of KAI (1942), then was transferred to the daytime department of MAI (1944). In 1950 he graduated from the Higher Engineering Courses at the Bauman Moscow State Technical University. Since 1947, in parallel with his studies, he worked at OKB-1 and NII-88 as a leading designer (until 1955). Participant in the creation (leading designer) of the R-11 operational-tactical missile and the first sea-based ballistic missile R-11FM. In 1950-1952 he worked as an instructor for the Central Committee of the Komsomol.

In 1955, at the suggestion of Sergei Korolev, he was appointed chief designer of SKB-385. From 1963 - head of the enterprise and chief designer, from 1977 - head of the enterprise, general designer. Under his leadership, the design bureau became the leading scientific and design organization of the country, a ramified cooperation of research institutes, design bureaus, manufacturing plants, test sites was formed, solving the problems of developing, manufacturing and testing missile systems for the Soviet Navy.

He conducted teaching work and supervised postgraduate studies. From 1960 to 1981, he was a professor and head of the aircraft engineering department at the Chelyabinsk Polytechnic Institute. From 1981 to 1985, he was head of the power engineering problems department at the Moscow Institute of Physics and Technology. He initiated cooperation between the USSR Academy of Sciences and higher education with industries in the field of composite material structure mechanics. The Scientific Council of the USSR Academy of Sciences, which he headed, played an important role in coordinating scientific research and conducting experimental and computational work. The research and development work on thin-walled composite shells carried out under the leadership and with the participation of Makeev were recognized by the Presidium of the USSR Academy of Sciences as one of the most important achievements in mechanics for 1981-1985.

Under the leadership and with the direct participation of Makeev, the construction of the Miass Mashgorodok with a shopping center, hotel, and palaces of culture and sports was carried out. With Makeyev's assistance, issues of construction and targeted financing of important city facilities were resolved: thermal power plants, power lines, reservoirs and trolleybus service, a television tower, construction of a new railway station and other facilities.

He died on October 25, 1985, on his 61st birthday. He was buried in Moscow at the Novodevichy Cemetery.

== Work ==
Makeyev's work has resulted in three generations of submarine-launched ballistic missiles being used by the Russian Navy.

Among these were:

First generation

- R-11FM – the first Soviet SLBM.
- R-13
- R-17 – known by NATO as Scud-B
- R-21 (SS-N-5 "Sark") – the first Soviet missile with underwater launch (1963)

Second generation

- R-27 – the first missile with factory fuelling (1968)
- R-27K
- R-29 – the world first intercontinental SLBM (1974)

Third generation

- R-29R – the first intercontinental SLBM with MRV (1977)
- R-39 – the first intercontinental SLBM with MIRV (1983)
- R-29RM – a complex missile of very high technical perfection

The domestic school of sea rocket production, founded and headed by Makeyev, has reached world excellence in a number of tactical and operational characteristics of rockets, control systems, starting systems. The key areas of expertise are:

- accommodation of engines inside tanks of fuel or oxidizer
- maximizing fuel capacitance of rocket shell
- successful use of astrocorrection in ballistic missiles
- use of zone amortization using elastomer materials
- ampulized fuel tanks factory refuelling

Under his management the laboratory/experimental base provided complex ground working for rockets.

In 1991, the State Rocket Center Makeyev Rocket Design Bureau was named after him. Also named in honour of Makeyev are an avenue in Miass, a street in Kolomna, and a vessel of the Northern fleet. Makeyev's bust is displayed in Miass and Kolomna.

Grants in his name were established in several universities. The Federation of Astronautics of the country has founded a medal. The academician of the century of Item of V. Makeyev. Makeyev was the author of 32 basic inventions, and published more than 200 printed works including monographs.

== Awards ==
- 1959 – Lenin Prize
- 1961 – Hero of Socialist Labor
- 1965 – Dr.Sci.Tech.
- 1968 – Member of the USSR Academy of Sciences
- 1968 – USSR State Prize
- 1974 – Hero of Socialist Labor
- 1978 – USSR State Prize
- 1983 – USSR State Prize

== Literature ==
- "Rockets and people" – B. E. Chertok, M: "mechanical engineering", 1999. ISBN 5-217-02942-0 (in Russian)
- "Testing of rocket and space technology - the business of my life" Events and facts - A.I. Ostashev, Korolyov, 2001.;
- "S. P. Korolev. Encyclopedia of life and creativity" - edited by C. A. Lopota, RSC Energia. S. P. Korolev, 2014 ISBN 978-5-906674-04-3
- A.I. Ostashev, Sergey Pavlovich Korolyov - The Genius of the 20th Century — 2010 M. of Public Educational Institution of Higher Professional Training MGUL ISBN 978-5-8135-0510-2.
- "I look back and have no regrets. " - Author: Abramov, Anatoly Petrovich: publisher "New format" Barnaul, 2022. ISBN 978-5-00202-034-8
