= TR-1 Temp =

TR-1 Temp SS-12 Scaleboard
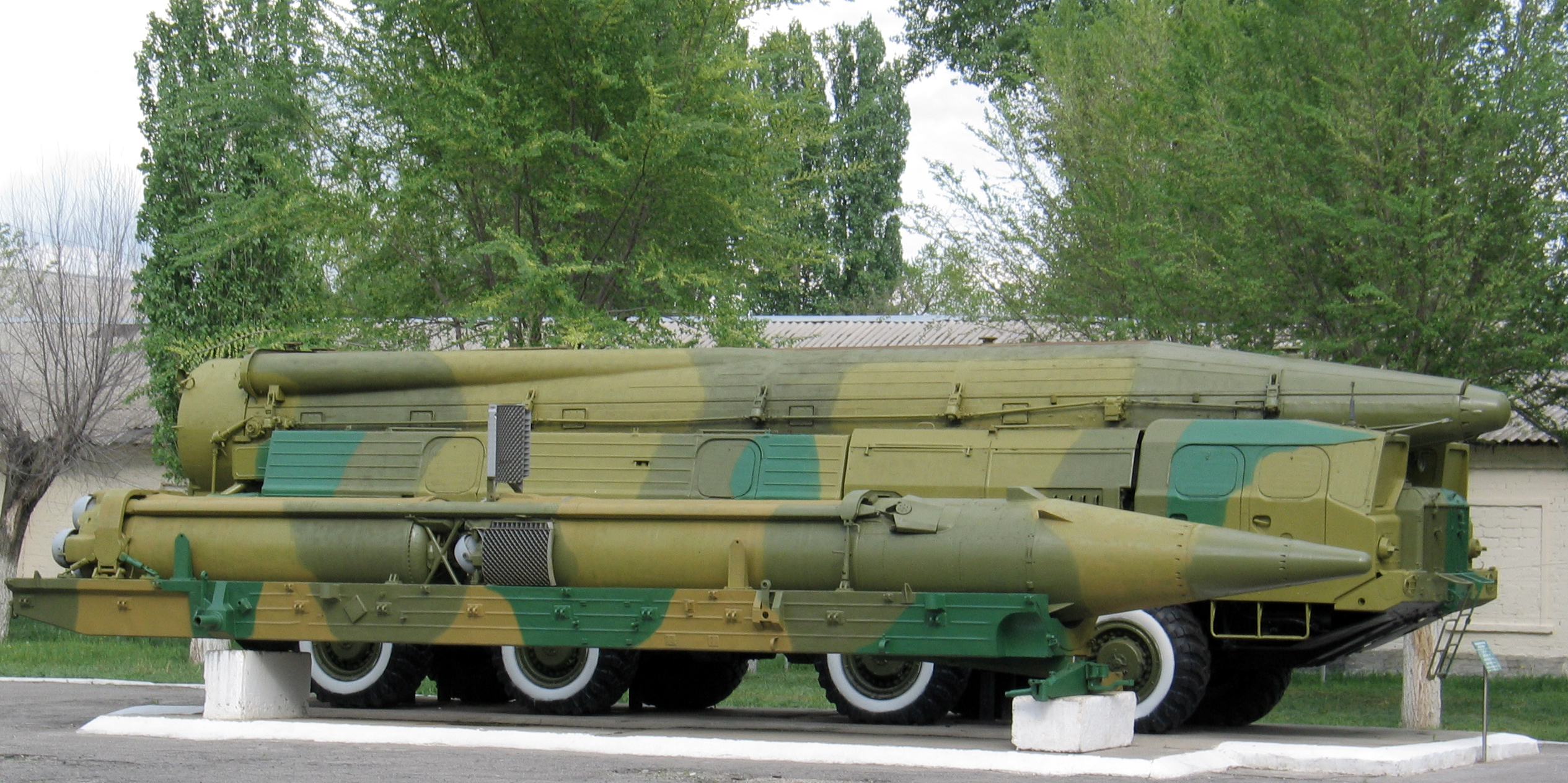
- 9P120 launcher with 9M76 rocket of missile complex Temp-S
- Type: Theatre ballistic missile Short-range ballistic missile
- Place of origin: USSR

Service history
- In service: 1969 – 1989
- Used by: Soviet Armed Forces

Production history
- Designer: Nadiradze OKB
- Manufacturer: Votkinsk Machine Building Plant

Specifications
- Mass: 9,700 kg (21,400 lb)
- Length: 12,400 mm (490 in)
- Diameter: 1,010 mm (40 in)
- Warhead: Single 500 kt warhead
- Engine: Single-stage liquid propellant
- Operational range: 800 km (500 mi) (SS-12); 900 km (560 mi) (SS-22)
- Guidance system: Inertial
- Accuracy: 750 m (0.47 mi) CEP (SS-12); 370 m (0.23 mi) CEP (SS-22)
- Launch platform: Road-mobile TEL
- Transport: Road-mobile TEL

The TR-1 Temp (Russian: Темп-С, Temp-S, meaning 'Speed') was a mobile theatre ballistic missile developed and deployed by the Soviet Union during the Cold War. It was assigned the NATO reporting name SS-12 Scaleboard and carried the industrial designation 9M76 and the GRAU index 9К76. A modified version was initially identified by NATO as a new design and given the SS-22 reporting name, but later recognized it as merely a variant of the original and maintained the name Scaleboard. The Temp entered service in the mid-1960s.

The TR-1 was designed as a mobile weapon to give theatre commanders nuclear strike capability. The weapon used the same mobile launcher (MAZ-543) as the R-17 Elbrus missile but had an environmental protective cover that split down the middle and was only opened when the missile was ready to fire. All were decommissioned in 1988–1989 as part of the INF treaty banning such weapons.

== Operators ==
Soviet Union
The Soviet Armed Forces were the only operator of the TR-1 Temp. It was also placed in countries of Warsaw Pact for example Hranice (Military area Libava) (39) in Czechoslovakia, and Königsbrück (19), Bischofswerda (8), Waren (22) and Wokuhl (5) in East Germany. Its active reach from there covered whole West Germany, parts of Scandinavia, France and Netherlands.

== See also ==
- MGM-31 Pershing and Pershing II – comparable U. S. theatre nuclear missiles
- List of missiles
- Ghaznavi
- Abdali-I
- Shaheen-I
- J-600T Yıldırım
- SOM
- Bora
- Fateh-313
- Qiam 1
- Al-Hussein
- Nasr
- Zelzal
- Tondar-69
- Burkan-1
- RT-21 Temp 2S
