= R-13 (missile) =

Soviet submarine-launched ballistic missile (SLBM)

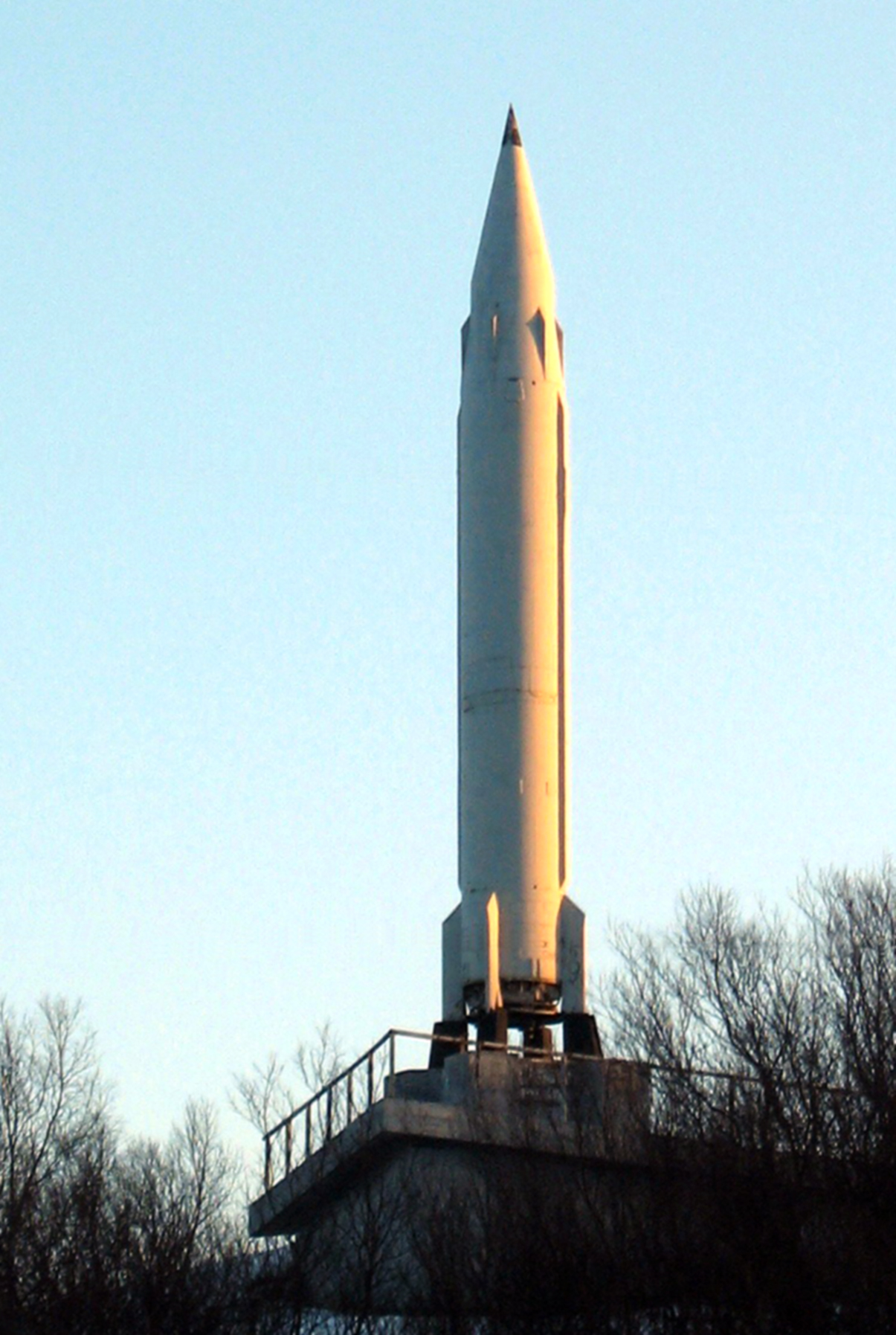
R-13 monument at Severomorsk naval base

The R-13 (Russian: ракета-13) was a submarine-launched ballistic missile (SLBM) developed by the Soviet Union starting around 1955. It was assigned the NATO reporting name SS-N-4 Sark and carried the GRAU index 4K50.

== History ==
Development of the R-13 was authorised by the Soviet Supreme Council on 25 July 1955 for use on the Project 629 and Project 658 submarines. The design work was started by OKB-1 under Sergei Korolev before being transferred to CB Miasskoe engineering / Makeyev Rocket Design Bureau (chief designer - Viktor Makeyev). Final technical specifications was approved by 11 January 1956. Serial production was undertaken at Zlatoust Machine-Building Plant in 1959. The R-13 was a single-stage liquid-fuel rocket and entered service in 1961. This missile was somewhat similar in design to the R-11FM missile, which caused some confusion in Western intelligence services during the Cold War. The missiles were phased out from 1965 to 1975.

A set of four stabilizers and verniers were used to keep the missile on-course during initial flight.

During initial testing before the missiles were deployed, 26 of 32 missiles (81%) were successfully launched. While the systems were deployed from 1961 to 1975, 225 of 311 launches (72%) were successful.

== Operators ==
Soviet Union

- Soviet Navy

== Specifications ==
- Length: 11.8 m (38 ft 9 in)
- Diameter: 1.3 m (4 ft 3 in)
- Diameter (to stabilizers): 1.9 m (6 ft 3 in)
- Launch weight: 13.7 t
- Warhead: single thermonuclear: 1.2 to 2.0 Mt (perhaps as low as 1.0 Mt)
- Propulsion: liquid-fuel rocket, single stage
  - Engine: Isaev S2.713 liquid rocket engine, 252 kN of thrust
  - Oxidizer: AK-27I
  - Fuel: TG-02
- Range: about 600 km (370 mi)
- Launching technique: surfaced
- CEP: 1.8 to 4 km (1.1 to 2.5 mi)

== See also ==
- List of missiles
