= RT-20P =

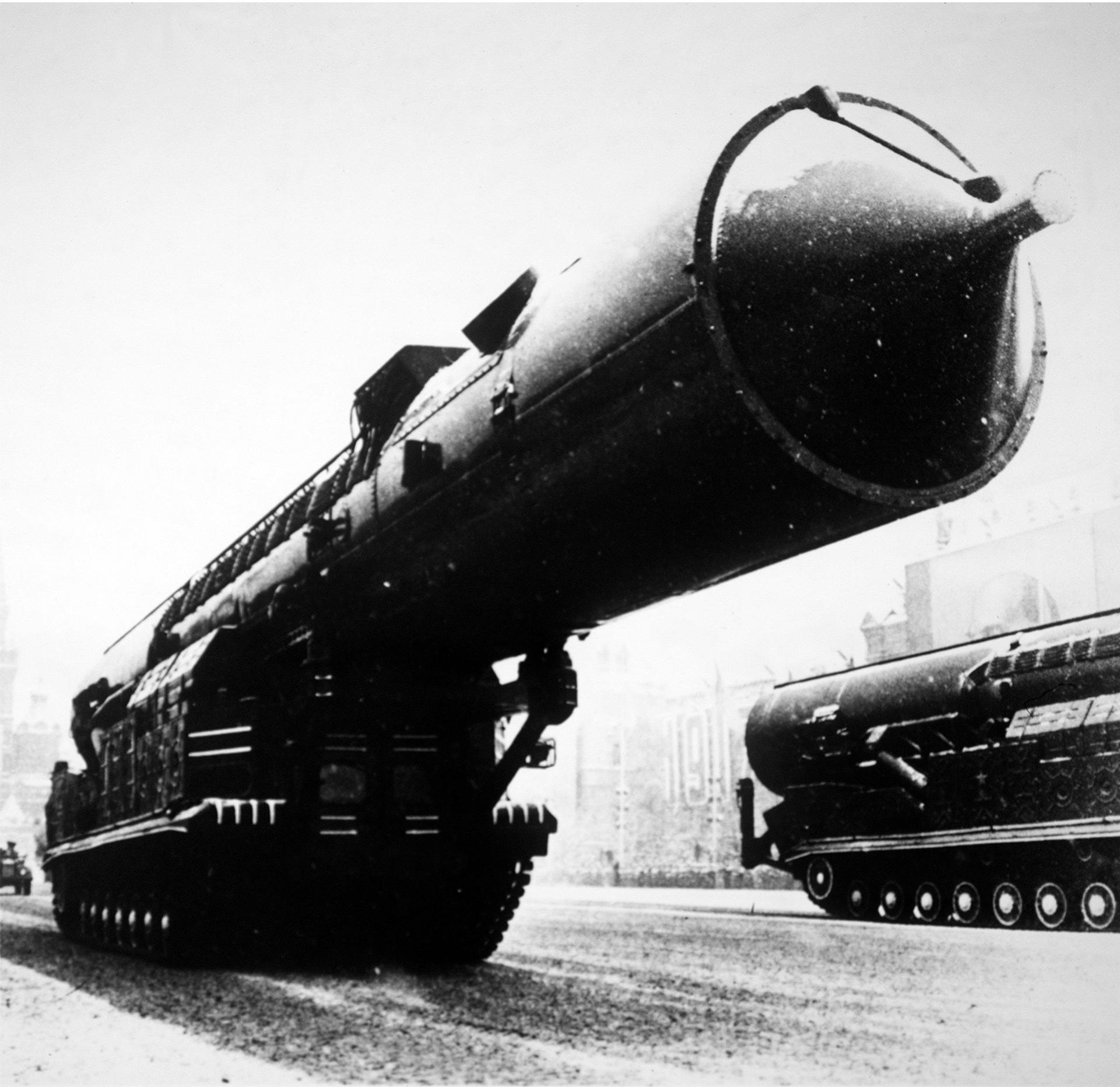
- Type: ICBM
- Place of origin: USSR

Production history
- Designed: 1961-1964
- Produced: 1964-1967

Specifications
- Mass: 30,200 kg (66,600 lb) +545 kg (1,202 lb) (Light Warhead version) +1,410 kg (3,110 lb) (Heavy Warhead version)
- Length: 17.48 m (57.3 ft) 'Light' Warhead; 17.80 m (58.4 ft) 'Heavy' Warhead
- Diameter: 1.8 m (5 ft 11 in)
- Warhead: Single 400 kt 'Light' Warhead or Single 1 MT 'Heavy' Warhead
- Engine: Solid fueled First Stage; Liquid fueled Second Stage First stage: 15D15 Solid Rocket Motor; Second Stage: RD-857 Liquid Rocket Engine
- Propellant: Solid Propellant; AK-27P + UDMH
- Operational range: 11,000 km (6,800 mi) (Light warhead); 8,000 km (5,000 mi) (Heavy warhead)
- Guidance system: inertial
- Accuracy: CEP 4 km
- Launch platform: TEL; platform based on T-10 tank

The RT-20P was an experimental intercontinental ballistic missile (ICBM) developed but not deployed by the Soviet Union during the Cold War. The control system for it was designed at NPO "Electropribor" (Kharkiv, Ukraine). It was assigned the NATO reporting name SS-15 Scrooge and carried the GRAU index 8K99. The RT-20 was the first mobile ICBM designed by the Soviet Union. Its launch platform was based on the T-10 tank.

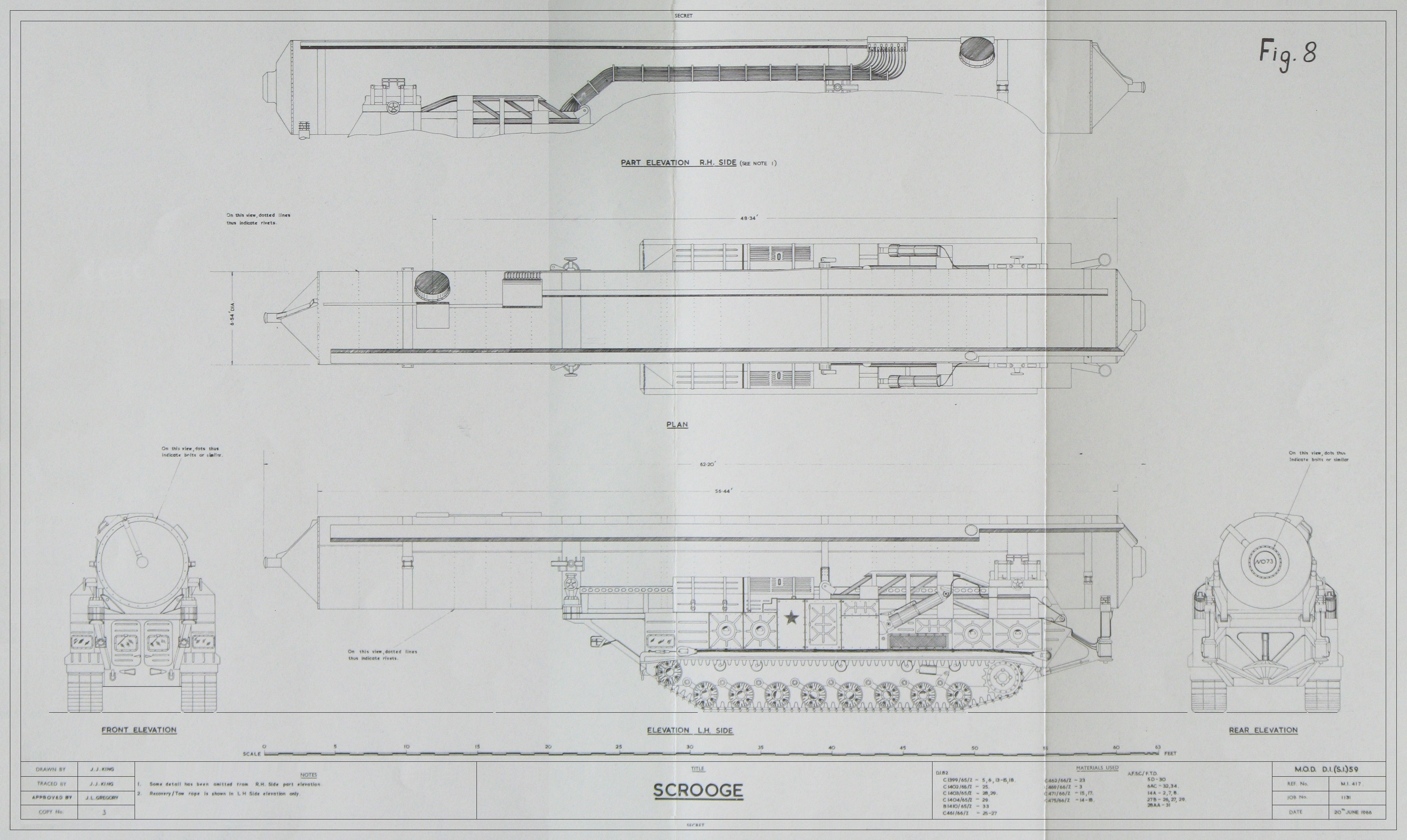
SS-15. UK MoD Defence Intelligence drawing.

== History ==
In the late 50s, the USSR started studying the usage of solid rocket motors and other modern technologies such as turbojets in ICBMs to improve their performance. From 1961 to 1962, several concepts of the missile were proposed at OKB-586 and in 1963 development was transferred to their R&D, with the ultimate goal of creating an ICBM with a total mass of no more than 30 tons. In 1964, preliminary design of the missile was completed and test firings of the engines commenced in 1965. On September 27, 1967, the missile had its first test flight and from October 1967 onward, flight tests of the missile were carried out at the 53rd Scientific Research Proving Ground (53rd NIIP). On October 6, 1969, development of the missile was discontinued to unwillingness of the Strategic Rocket Forces to work with a missile containing both liquid and solid propellant.

Despite never being deployed, the missile provided the groundwork for other mobile ICBMs, such as the RT-21 Temp 2S and the RT-2PM Topol.

== Operator ==
Soviet Union
The Strategic Rocket Forces was the only operator of the RT-20.

== Gallery ==
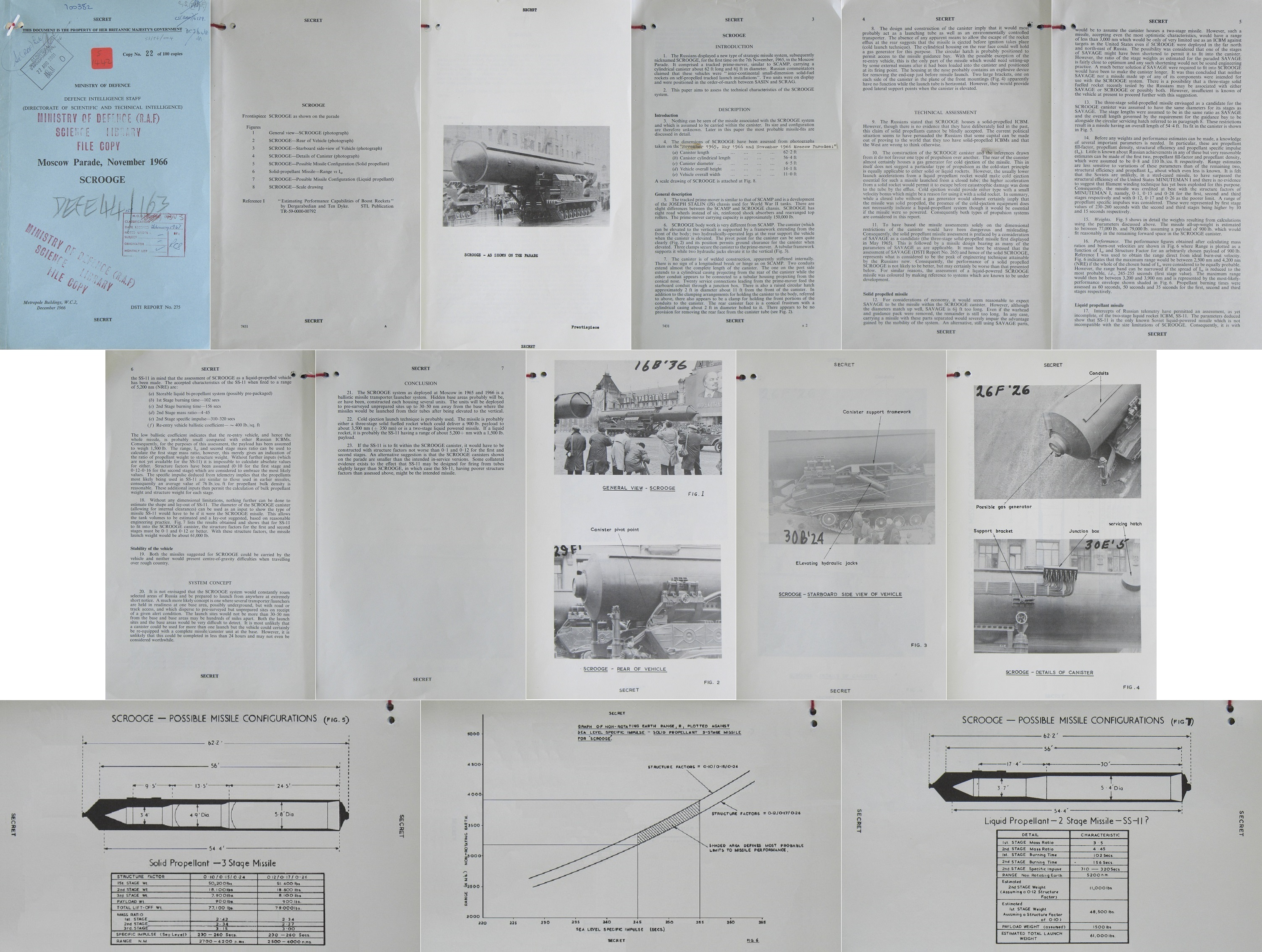
UK MoD Defence Intelligence assessment. Complete report montaged.

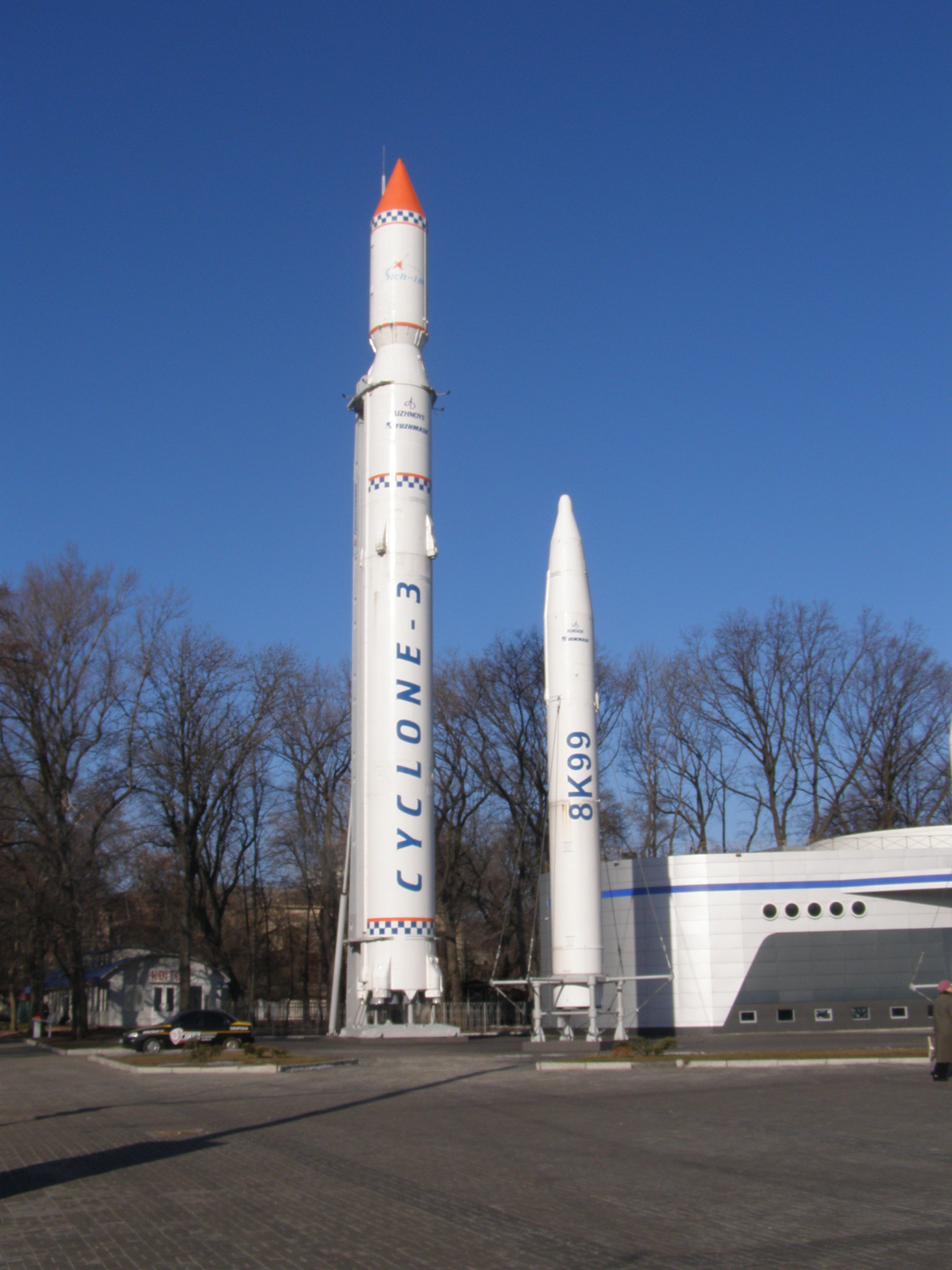
RT-20 next to a larger Tsyklon-3 on display in downtown Dnipro.

== See also ==
- List of missiles
- List of orbital launch systems
