= RT-15 =

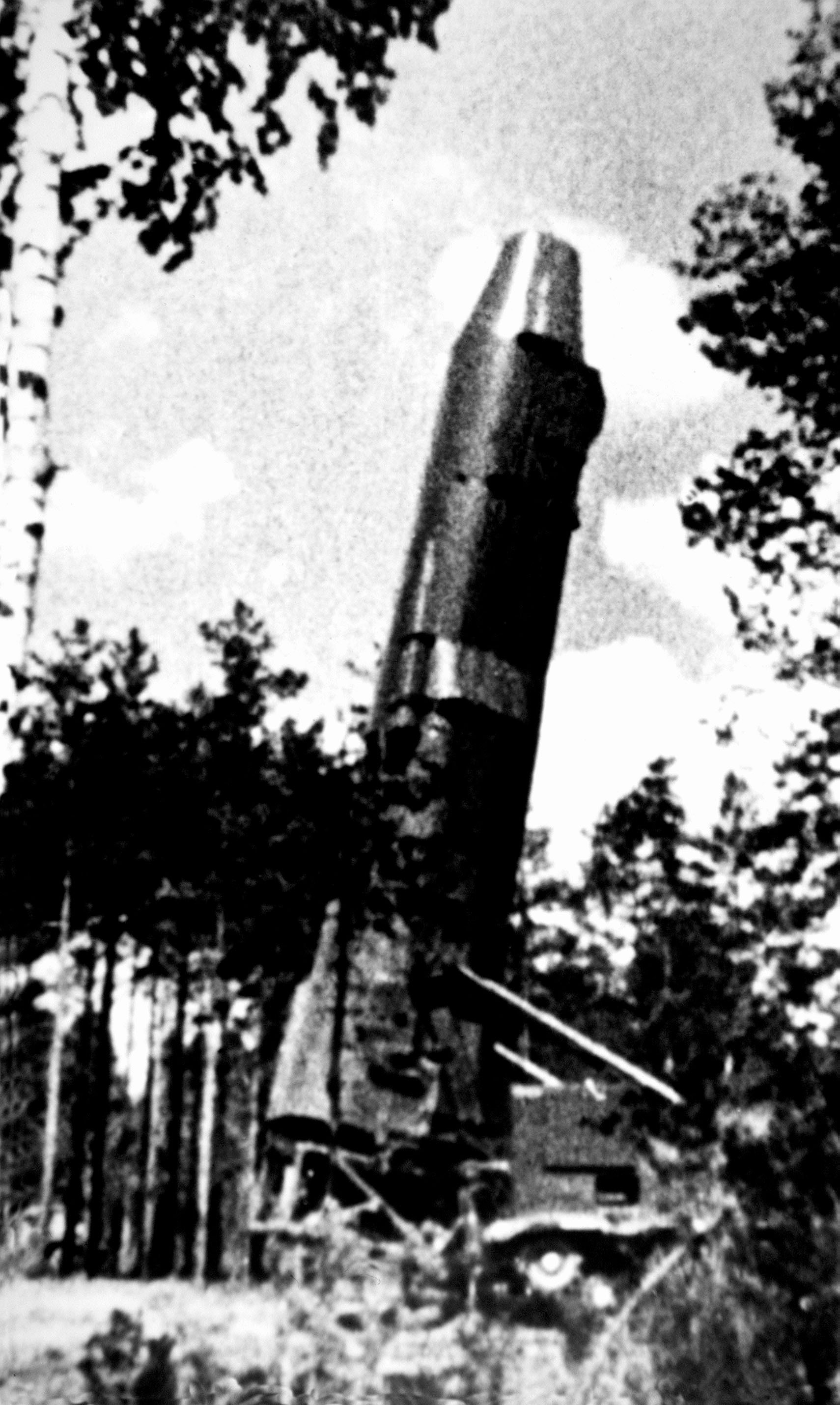
- RT-15
- Type: Theatre ballistic missile Medium-range ballistic missile
- Place of origin: USSR

Specifications
- Mass: 16,000 kg (35,000 lb)
- Length: 11.93 m (39.1 ft)
- Diameter: 1.49 m (4 ft 11 in)
- Warhead: 1 Mt nuclear warhead
- Engine: 2-stage solid rocket. Stage one 15D27, second stage 15D2 or 15D92
- Operational range: 2,500 km (1,600 mi)
- Accuracy: CEP 900 m (3,000 ft)

The RT-15 was a mobile theatre ballistic missile deployed by the Soviet Union during the Cold War. It was assigned the NATO reporting name SS-14 Scamp (alternately the SS-14 Scapegoat) and carried the GRAU index 8K96.

The RT-15 was an early Soviet attempt to develop a road-mobile theatre ballistic missile. It was intended to be capable of being launched from both sea and ground sites and had a maximum range of 2000–2500 km. The weapon's 'reaction time' in the normal readiness condition after its arrival at the launch site would have been 20 to 30 minutes and the 'holding time' at peak readiness (with a time of two to ten minutes before the missile could be launched) would be about a day.

== Development history ==
On April 4, 1961, the Resolution of the CPSU Central Committee and the Council of Ministers of the USSR No. 316—137 was issued, in which OKB-1 of S. P. Korolev was appointed as the lead organization for the creation of a new stationary missile system with a solid-fuel ICBM, equipped with a monoblock warhead and designated as RT-2 (8K98). The resolution also provided for the development of a mobile missile system on a tracked chassis with an 8K96 missile with a range of 2,500 km and its silo-based version. To create the RT-15, the engines of the second and third stages of the RT-2 were used. Korolev was the chairman of the Council of Chief Designers and supervised work on both the RT-2 and the RT-15.

It was intended to use the missile as part of mobile (15P696) and stationary (15P069) complexes. The 15U64 launchers of the 15P096 stationary complex were developed at TsKB-34 (KBSM) by chief designer V. F. Lender and manufactured by the "Bolshevik" plant (two launchers) for installation in structures built at GTSP-4, where flight-construction tests (LKI) were to be conducted. However, at the installation stage of the launchers, work was stopped, and further work was carried out only on the 15P696 mobile complex.

Work on the 15P696 missile complex was led by the chief designer of TsKB-7 (Design Bureau of the "Arsenal" plant) Pyotr Aleksandrovich Tyurin, while the launch complex was designed by the chief designer of TsKB-34, V. V. Chernetsky. In 1962, TsKB-34 developed a preliminary design for the complex, and KB-3 of the Kirov Plant under the leadership of chief designer Zh. Ya. Kotin developed the working drawings for the launchers (tracked "Object 815"). The Kirov Plant manufactured two launchers. Testing was planned to begin in the third quarter of 1963. However, by a Decree of the USSR Government dated June 16, 1963, due to a delay in the refinement of solid fuel, the start of tests was postponed until positive results were obtained for the RT-2 (8K98) missile. Accordingly, all work on the 8K96 was suspended.

In August 1965, after the customer issued a supplement to the tactical-technical requirements (TTR), a revision of the preliminary design of the complex was required. In particular, it was required that the missile launch be carried out directly from a transport-launch container (TLC). The changes in the TTR were so significant that they required the development of a new launcher, a new structure, and a new composition of the complex.
The volume of work was clearly impossible to complete within the established deadlines for the start of flight tests — the second quarter of 1966; therefore, in agreement with the customer, tests were started with a reduced set of equipment, and as the equipment became ready, the composition of the complex was replenished to the level provided for by the TTR.

The self-propelled launcher of the missile complex was first shown at the military parade in Moscow on Red Square in 1965.. It featured the missile's TLC, which had been used in the early stages of the complex's design

The system was refused acceptance for general service, on the grounds that the launch support electronics was too bulky and fragile. The missiles at Lesnaya were decommissioned during 1971.

== Variants ==
- RT-25 modernized derivative
- RT-15M (RSM-25) MRBM and SLBM

== Operators ==
Soviet Union

== See also ==
- List of missiles
- Theatre ballistic missiles
