= DF-25 =

Intermediate-range ballistic missile

- Type: IRBM

Specifications
- Warhead: 1 or more (up to 3) nuclear or conventional warheads.
- Engine: two-stage solid-propellant rocket
- Operational range: 3,200 km (2,000 mi)
- Guidance system: Inertial guidance/BeiDou Navigation Satellite System + terminal active radar homing guidance
- Launch platform: road-mobile Transporter erector launcher

DF-25 (Dong Feng-25) was a Chinese two-stage, solid-propellant, road-mobile Intermediate-range ballistic missile (IRBM). Missilethreat.com stated it could deliver a single or multiple conventional warheads weighing 1,800 kg (4,000 lb) over a maximum distance of 3,200 km to 4,000 km.

There are conflicting reports on whether the DF-25 entered service, and if so, when. The Federation of American Scientists notes reports that China had abandoned development of the DF-25 in 1996. The U.S. Department of Defense in its 2013 report to Congress on China's military developments made no mention of the DF-25 as a missile in service.
