= R-15 (missile) =

Soviet submarine-launched ballistic missile

The R-15 (Р-15) was a submarine-launched ballistic missile (SLBM) design from the Soviet Union during the Cold War. The R-15 was a project to develop an SLBM for the D-3 missile system with the capability to be launched while submerged. The development was authorized for OKB-586 in Dnipropetrovsk, Ukraine, on 20 March 1958 and cancelled before testing in December 1958.

== Development ==
The Soviet Union's nuclear submarine project began the middle of the 1950s and focused on attaching nuclear warheads to a variety of delivery systems. The Soviet military required the Navy to use nuclear weapons to enhance the effectiveness of naval operation against large ships, naval bases, groups of ships, or other strategic targets. The decree also gave OKB-586, a Russian design office, the task to create the R-15 missile for the D-3 on March 20, 1958. The R-15 missile was planned to have a range of 1,000 kilometers and the design required improvements from the D-1 and D-2 systems. The missile was planned to launch directly from the launch tube unlike the D-1 and D-2, which had to be raised.

The R-15 missile was designed for a nuclear submarine in 1958. The Special Design Bureau No. 143(SKB-143) began to design the Project 639 submarine that would use three R-15 missiles. While another design bureau in 1958, Central Design Bureau No. 16, worked on Project V-629 that would use the R-15. Project V-629 designed a diesel submarine that would keep a single R-15 missile on board. Most of the design projects would be halted because the missile's size and weight would not meet performance specifications. The work on the D-3 missile system and the accompanying submarines designs were canceled during December 1958.

== See also ==
- List of missiles
