= Lists of rockets =

There are several different types of rockets. The following articles contain lists of rockets by type:

- List of missiles
- List of orbital launch systems
- List of sounding rockets
- List of military rockets
- List of rocket stages
- List of canceled launch vehicle designs

== See also ==
- Comparison of orbital launch systems
- Comparison of orbital launchers families
- Comparison of space station cargo vehicles
- Comparison of orbital rocket engines
- Comparison of solid-fuelled orbital launch systems
- List of space launch system designs
- List of artillery § Rockets
- List of rocket aircraft
- Lists of weapons
- Model rocket
- NATO reporting name (has lists of various Soviet missiles)
