= Soviet naval ballistic systems =

Soviet submarine-launched ballistic missile systems during the Cold War

The development of submarine-launched ballistic missile (SLBM) systems was a critical aspect of the Cold War arms race between the United States and the Soviet Union. These systems, deployed on nuclear-powered submarines (SSBNs), were at the forefront of technological competition between the two superpowers, driving advancements in both military and civilian technologies, including space exploration. The rivalry shaped the design, automation, and operational tactics of these systems, reflecting the distinct economic, scientific, political, ideological, and cultural characteristics of each nation.

Technologically, the Soviet Union relied on liquid-fuel missiles, prioritizing high automation in submarine operations and maximizing submarine performance. The nation achieved significant innovations, occasionally gaining advantages in specific technical areas. SLBM systems were the most effective means of strategic nuclear deterrence, forming a cornerstone of their respective nuclear triads, alongside land-based missiles and strategic bombers, except during the early Cold War period.

== Origins ==
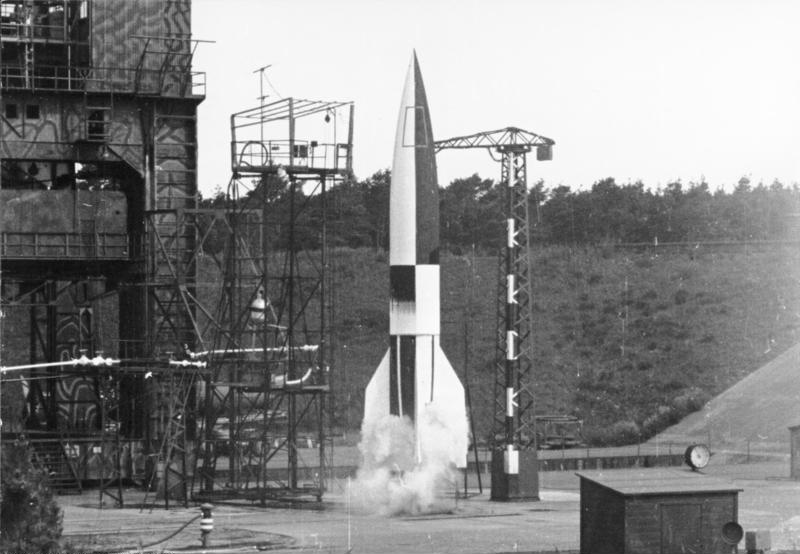
V-2 missile

The concept of submarine-launched ballistic missiles (SLBM) is related to the German V-2 rocket program during World War II. In 1944, Klaus Riedel, a member of the Peenemünde research team, proposed launching V-2 rockets from the North Sea against the United Kingdom, using submarines to tow launch containers. These containers, approximately 32 meters (105 ft) long, 5.7 meters (19 ft) in diameter, and with a displacement of 500 tons, housed a single V-2 missile, crew quarters, a control center, and fuel and ballast tanks. A single submarine could tow up to three containers. Plans also included towing containers across the Atlantic to target New York City. The crew would travel aboard the submarine, transfer to the container for fueling, and launch the missile. The project, developed at the AG Vulcan Stettin shipyard in Szczecin, reached 65–70% completion for three containers by the war's end, with a prototype tested near Peenemünde.

After the war, the Soviet Union established the Rabe Institute in Bleicherode, near Nordhausen, where captured German scientists, including Helmut Gröttrup, continued their work under Soviet supervision. In October 1946, the NKVD arrested approximately 5,000 German specialists, relocating them to the Soviet Union to advance Soviet ballistic missile development. As a result, the German V-2 designers made a significant contribution to the Soviet ballistic missile programs.

== First-generation systems ==
Starting in October 1945, the United Kingdom, the United States, and the Soviet Union began a series of tests on captured or assembled V-2 missiles. The Soviet Union was aware of the German concept of underwater missile launchers, but showed little interest in this idea at the time, placing greater hopes in sea-launched cruise missiles for long-range strikes. The ballistic missile program was overseen by government structures, especially the NKVD and the Artillery Directorate of the Red Army.

In 1949, the Soviet Union developed a preliminary design for a missile submarine under the designation Project P-2, intended to strike land targets. The design was developed by CKB-18 (later the Rubin Design Bureau). The submarine was projected to have a surface displacement of nearly 5,400 tons and to carry 12 R-1 missiles (Soviet versions of the V-2) and Lastochka cruise missiles. However, the program encountered numerous issues that the designers could not overcome, including, among others, problems with stabilizing the missile prior to launch. In the early phase of developing sea-to-land missile systems, the Soviet Union regarded this kind of weapon solely as a tactical asset without strategic significance.

Soviet development of SLBM systems began with a government decree on 26 January 1954, appointing Sergei Korolev, head of OKB-1 NII-88, to lead the D-1 missile system program. Between 1953 and 1954, Korolev proposed a naval variant of the liquid-fueled R-11 missile, designated R-11FM, with modified fuel components and navigation systems to accept launch data from submarines. Test launches of the R-11FM were carried out between 1954 and 1955 at the 4th Missile Test Range in Kapustin Yar. After three launches from a stationary platform, one launch was conducted from a moving platform to simulate motion. OKB-1 developed a launch procedure involving the missile being raised from a surfaced submarine container before ignition from above the container. Although the Soviet Navy insisted on the ability to launch the missile from a submerged submarine, Korolev opposed the idea, arguing that a surface launch would take less time. Apart from the missile itself, the program faced numerous challenges, including determining the submarine's exact position, accurately aiming at targets, ensuring safe communication, and other related issues. However, all of these were eventually resolved, and by the end of 1956 a full set of construction documents had been completed.

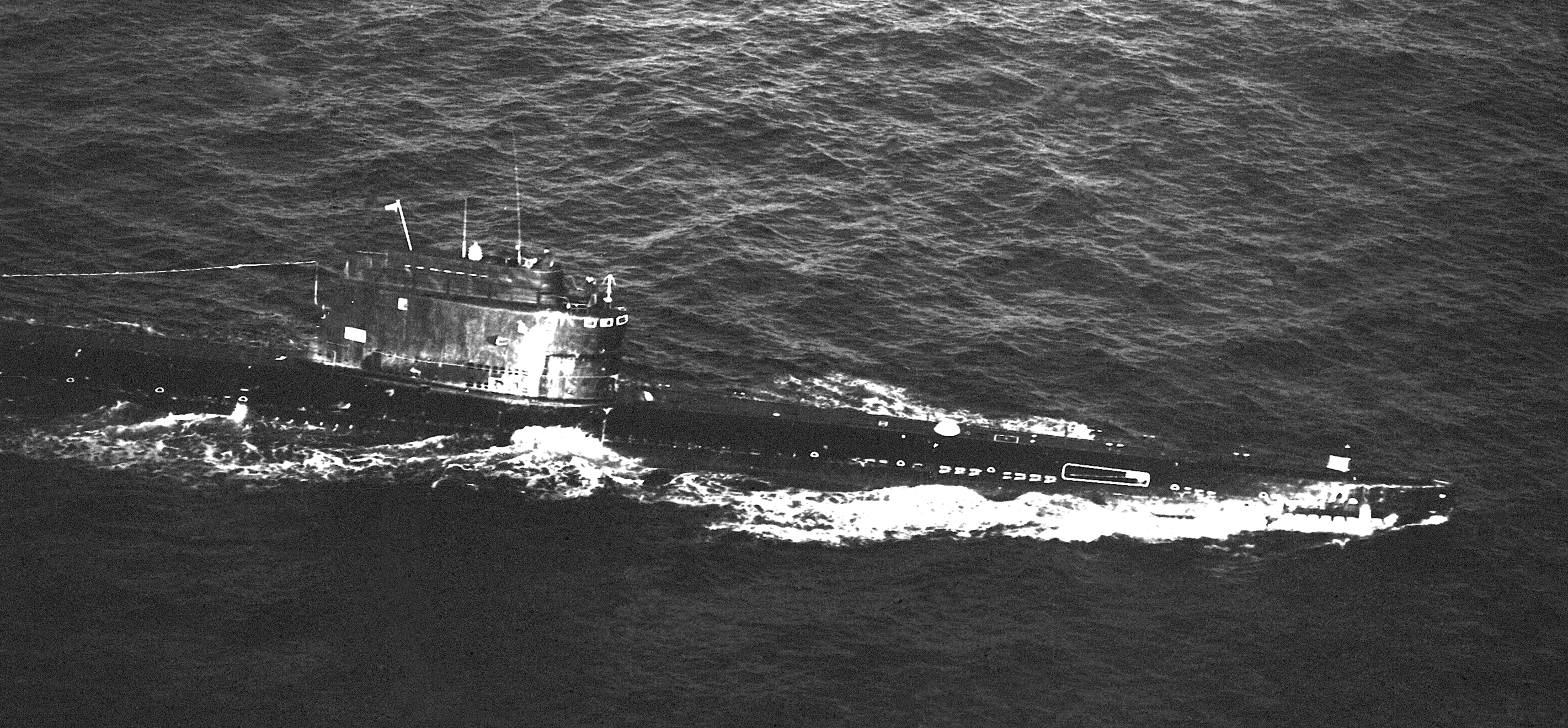
Project 611 submarine (NATO code: Zulu)

The world's first submarine equipped with ballistic missiles was the Soviet modified Project 611 submarine (NATO code: Zulu) – B-67. On this submarine, two vertical R-11FM missile launchers were installed in an enlarged sail, which required sacrificing part of the electric battery compartments beneath the sail as well as several officers' quarters, who were relocated to the torpedo storage area. The first-ever launch of a ballistic missile from a submarine took place on 16 September 1955. Fired from the surfaced B-67 in the White Sea, the R-11FM missile struck the test range on Novaya Zemlya. That same year, work began on a modified version of Project 611, designated AW611.

In 1959, the first R-11FM missiles achieved operational readiness, making the Soviet Union the first country armed with submarine-launched ballistic missiles. During regular patrols, these missiles were not equipped with their designated RDS-4 nuclear warheads (yield: 10 kilotons), which were stored on land and could be installed on the missiles in case of an imminent threat.

Meanwhile, in 1955, Sergei Korolev decided to transfer work on submarine ballistic missiles from OKB-1 to a special design bureau, SKB-385, headed by Viktor Makeyev. This allowed Korolev to focus on longer-range strategic missiles and space programs. After the transfer, SKB-385 began developing the D-2 missile system, consisting of the new R-13 missile and a new series of submarines under Project 629 (NATO: Golf class). The R-13 missile, with a range of 650 kilometers (400 mi), was powered by a liquid-fuel engine and, like the R-11, was launched from the surface. The submarines designed for this missile used the same diesel-electric propulsion system as their contemporary Project 641 boats (NATO code: Foxtrot). Built at CKB-16 under the direction of Isanin, the Project 629 submarines had a surface displacement of 2,850 tons and could carry three R-13 missiles.

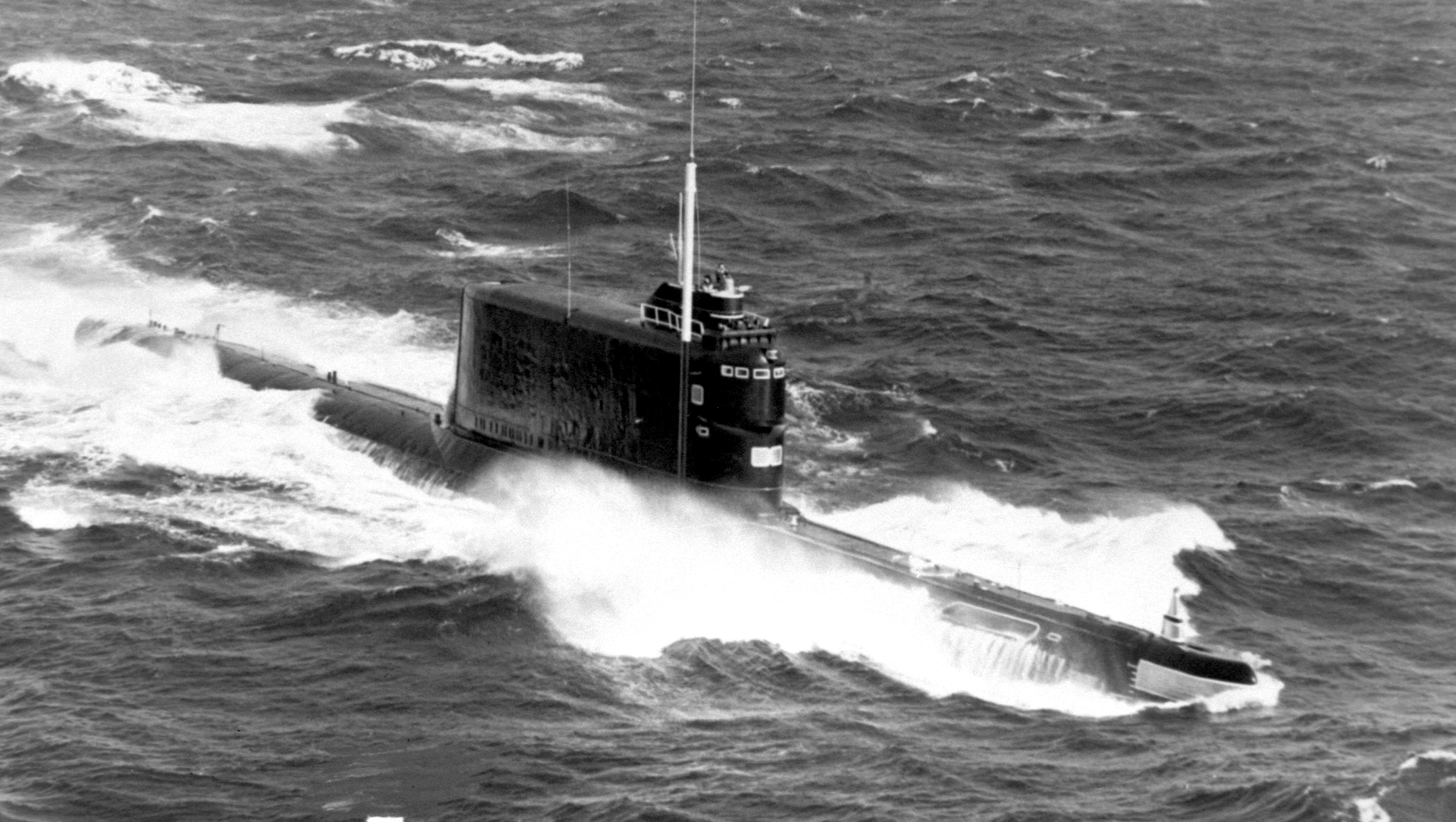
Project 629 submarine (NATO code: Golf)

The launch tubes for these missiles extended through the entire height of the inner hull, reaching up into the submarine's sail. Launches took place from the surface, after the missiles were raised above the sail. The first five submarines of this type carried R-11FM missiles, while later ones were equipped with R-13s. During the construction of the first vessels, CKB-16 began developing a system with a small reactor designed to supply energy for battery charging on Project 629 submarines, eliminating the need for diesel engines for this purpose. However, this program was discontinued. The lead ship of Project 629 was B-41 (later designated K-79), which was built at Severodvinsk and delivered to the navy in 1959. Over the following three years, shipyards in Severodvinsk and Komsomolsk-on-Amur built 22 submarines of this class. Sections for two additional units built at the latter yard were transferred to China, where one was assembled in Dalian and designated as Type 035. The second unit was never completed.

On 20 October 1961, the world's first test of a submarine-launched ballistic missile armed with a thermonuclear warhead was conducted. A Project 629 submarine launched an R-13 missile equipped with a 1-megaton warhead, which detonated at the "Rainbow" military training area on Novaya Zemlya. As a result of this test, nuclear-armed R-13 missiles were approved for use on submarines. In 1955, experimental work began on launching ballistic missiles from submerged submarines. After overcoming numerous difficulties, the first test involving the launch of a missile mock-up from a submerged vessel was carried out in 1957. The mock-up was launched from the submerged Project 613D4 (NATO: Whiskey) submarine S-229. The vessel was modified at the Black Sea Shipyard in Mykolaiv on the Black Sea, with two launch towers protruding above the hull and sail installed amidships. The missile mock-ups featured a solid-fuel booster stage and a second liquid-fuel stage.

At Severodvinsk, the previously used test submarine B-67 of Project W611 (Zulu) was also modified under the designation PW611. The first underwater launch from B-67 took place in August 1959 but ended in failure. On 10 September 1960, the S4-7 missile (a modified R-11FM) was successfully launched from a submerged submarine. Shortly before the completion of the first Project 629 (NATO: Golf) submarine, SKB-385 began work in 1958 on a new liquid-fueled missile, the R-21 (NATO: SS-N-5 Serb), with a range of 755 nautical miles (1,398 km; 869 mi), twice that of the R-13. The R-21 could be launched from depths of 40 to 50 meters (130 to 160 ft) while the submarine was moving at speeds of up to 4 knots (7.4 km/h; 4.6 mph).

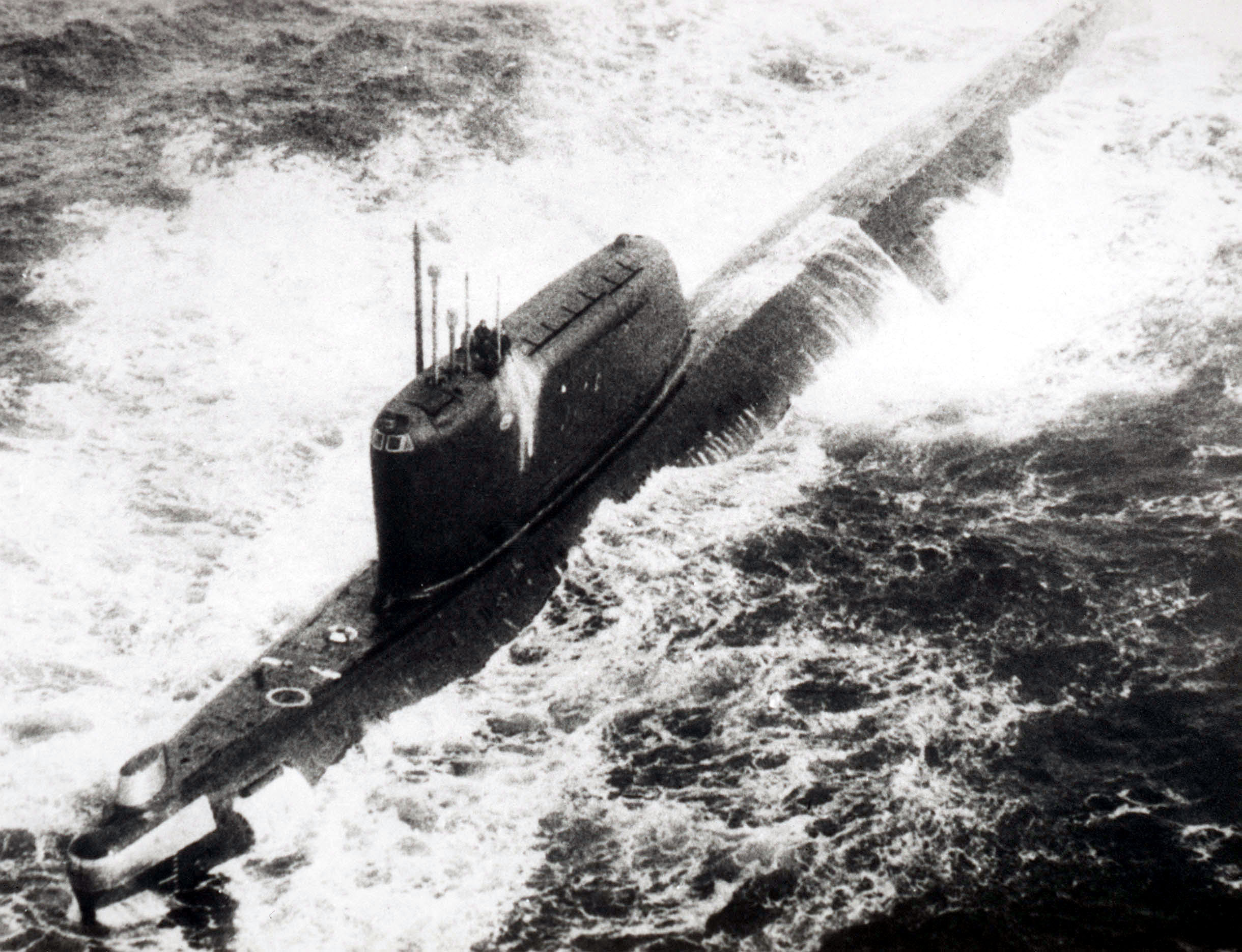
Project 658M submarine

The first submerged launch of an R-21 missile took place in 1961 from the submarine S-229. The vessel had been fitted with two individual launch tubes housed in towers protruding above the hull. A year later, two such launch towers were installed on K-142, the final Project 629 (Golf) submarine built at Severodvinsk – this version was redesigned as Project 629B. Completed in 1961, K-142 carried out its first submerged missile launch on 24 February 1962.

By 1972, 13 additional submarines from Projects 629 (Golf) and 658 (NATO: Hotel) were modified to carry three R-21 missiles capable of being launched from underwater. These submarines became, respectively, Projects 629A (Golf II) and 658M. The modified 629A vessels were repurposed as non-strategic missile platforms. In 1976, six of them were transferred from the Northern Fleet to the Baltic Fleet to serve as sea-based platforms for tactical ballistic missiles; the remaining seven served with the Pacific Fleet. These submarines remained in service for nearly three decades – until 1989, when the last units were decommissioned. The Golf-class submarines were considered relatively successful, although one of them, K-129 (a converted Project 629A/Golf II), sank during a patrol in the North Pacific on 25 February 1968, with the loss of all 98 crew members.

In September 1956, the Rubin Design Bureau – initially led by P. Z. Golosovsky, then I. B. Mikhailov, and ultimately Sergey Nikitich Kovalev – began intensive work on a new class of submarines under Project 658 (NATO: Hotel). Due to the tight schedule, the program proceeded without the development of a preliminary design. As a result, by the first quarter of the following year, the design was completed for submarines with a surface displacement of 4,080 tonnes and a length of 114 meters (374 ft). These vessels were originally equipped with three R-13 missiles (NATO: SS-N-4), as well as 533-and-400-millimeter (21.0 and 15.7 in) torpedo tubes – similar to those found on Project 675 (NATO: Echo II) submarines – for anti-submarine warfare against destroyers. Their propulsion systems resembled those used on Project 627A (NATO: November-class SSN) and Projects 659 and 675 (NATO: Echo SSGNs), utilizing two VM-A nuclear reactors. All units of this class faced technical issues. The main causes were poor workmanship and inadequate or entirely lacking quality control in the shipyards and among component suppliers. According to chief designer Sergey Kovalev: "It was a real disaster – leaking steam generators, leaking condensers, and, practically speaking, their military usefulness was doubtful".

Also in 1956, the SKB-143 bureau began design work on a larger nuclear-powered submarine capable of carrying heavier missiles. Project 639 submarines were to have a surface displacement of 6,000 tonnes, nuclear propulsion driving four shafts, and armament consisting of three R-15 missiles developed by OKB-586. These liquid-fuel missiles had a range of 540 nautical miles (1,000 km; 620 mi) and were launched from the surface. CKB-16 also developed a new diesel-electric design, the W629, capable of carrying a single large R-15 missile. However, because the R-15 required surface launching and had inferior performance compared to other missiles, both the missile and submarine programs were cancelled in December 1958.

== Second-generation systems ==
On 20 February 1959, the Soviet Union was the first in the world to deploy ballistic missile rockets on board submarines. The country had eight nuclear-powered submarines and 29 diesel-electric submarines, carrying a total of 104 missiles. The Soviet second-generation naval systems programs aimed to eliminate the American qualitative advantage in first-generation systems. The design of Soviet ships of this generation began in 1950 at the CKB-18 bureau. Nine years later, due to the creation of the Strategic Rocket Forces, the work was halted and then resumed after the end of the Cuban Missile Crisis.

=== Yankee ===
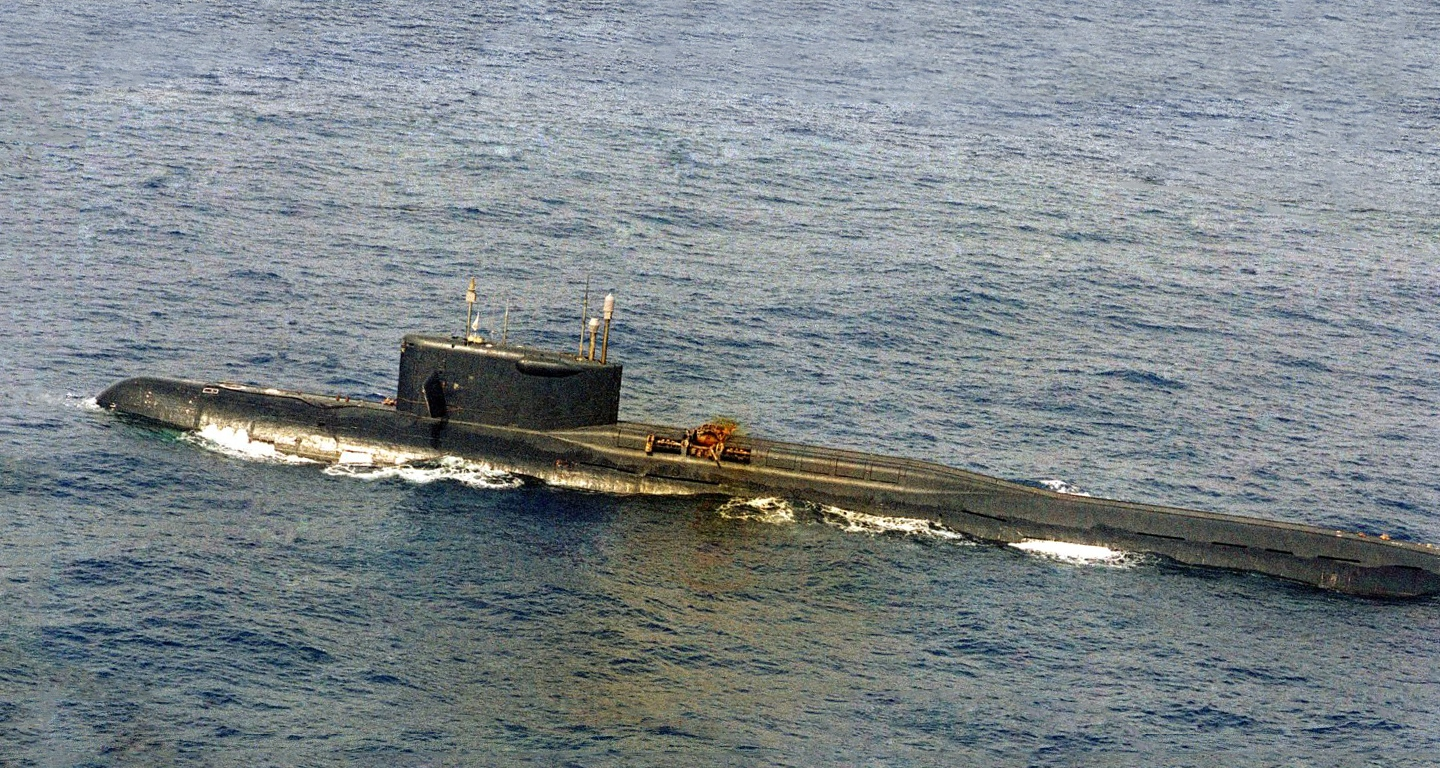
Project 667A submarine

Initially, the design work focused on Project 667 submarines intended to carry eight R-21 (SS-N-5) missiles. However, due to significant design difficulties, such extensive modifications to the project became necessary that the result was a nearly completely different design, known as Project 667A (Navaga class, NATO code: Yankee).

The complexity of the original Project 667 design, caused by the need to assemble the missiles only once aboard the submarines and by the concept of a rotating launcher, meant that the project was never realized. Meanwhile, work was nearing completion on the new, smaller solid-fueled RT-15M missiles – naval versions of a land-based missile – which underwent testing aboard a Project 613D7 submarine (NATO: Whiskey; S-229), followed by 20 test launches from a Project 629B submarine.

Design bureau SKB-385 – apparently – was not significantly interested in developing a heavy solid-fueled missile. Moreover, the development program for this missile significantly exceeded the planned timeline. As a result, the entire RT-15M missile program was canceled in 1964. Instead, SKB-385 proposed the introduction of smaller and three times lighter single-stage liquid-fueled R-27 missiles (NATO: SS-N-6 Serb), used in the D-5 system. The R-27 was a single-stage, underwater-launched, liquid-fueled missile with a range of 2,500 kilometers (1,600 mi). Initial R-27 tests were conducted between 1963 and 1967 from a Project 613D5 submarine equipped with two launchers, followed by tests from a modified Project 629B submarine (NATO: Golf SSB), rebuilt to Project 605 with four launchers.

In the early 1960s, the possibility of retrofitting the earlier Project 658 submarines (NATO: Hotel class) with the D-5 system and R-27 missiles was considered. Additionally, between 1964 and 1965, design bureau CKB-16 began preliminary work on Project 687 – an ultra-fast submarine based on the Project 705 design (NATO: Alfa class), with a submerged displacement of 4,200 tons and equipped with the D-5 system carrying either R-27 missiles or the R-27K, an anti-ship variant of the R-27. At the same time, SKB-143 initiated work on Project 679 submarines, which were based on the Project 671 design and also armed with the D-5 missile system. The design approach was similar to the American conversion of Skipjack-class submarines to the Polaris configuration. However, these efforts were halted before any results were achieved. Instead, based on the promising D-5/R-27 system, design bureau CKB-18 focused its efforts on the development of Project 667A, whose chief designer was Sergei Kovalev, the final chief designer of Project 658. The Project 667A submarines were sent into production at Severodvinsk and Komsomolsk-on-Amur. Similar to the American Polaris submarines, the Project 667A boats were fitted with 16 vertical launch tubes arranged in two rows just behind the sail. Although they were broadly comparable to the George Washington-class submarines, the Soviet boats had a greater diving depth, a shorter interval between missile launches, and a higher maximum speed.

The 667A submarines could launch their missiles from a depth of 50 meters (160 ft). They could also fire missiles while moving underwater at speeds of 3 to 6 knots (5.6 to 11.1 km/h; 3.5 to 6.9 mph). However, according to Soviet designers themselves, the Soviet submarines were significantly noisier than their American counterparts. The pre-launch preparation time was approximately 10 minutes, and the time to fire a salvo of four missiles was 24 seconds, but pauses were required between salvos. Thus, the total time from the first to the last launch (with 16 missiles aboard) amounted to 27 minutes. Representatives of the Soviet Navy and industry openly admitted that due to the much higher noise levels of Soviet submarines, they were inferior to American boats. Similarly, Soviet missiles received poorer evaluations compared to their American counterparts. As Sergei Kovalev explained, Soviet design bureaus struggled with mastering the complex nature of sound propagation underwater. Although the design teams did everything possible to reduce the noise of the new submarines, after launching and during trials it turned out that all the components together did not function quietly – the submarine turned out to be loud.

The first Project 667A submarine, Soviet submarine K-137 Leninets, was commissioned on 5 November 1967. By 1972, a total of 34 vessels of this type had been built – 24 at the shipyard in Severodvinsk and 10 in Komsomolsk. The construction pace exceeded that of the American Polaris submarines, averaging 6.8 submarines per year compared to 5.5 in American shipyards. Additionally, while the American program ended after the construction of 41 vessels, the Soviet SSBN-building program continued.

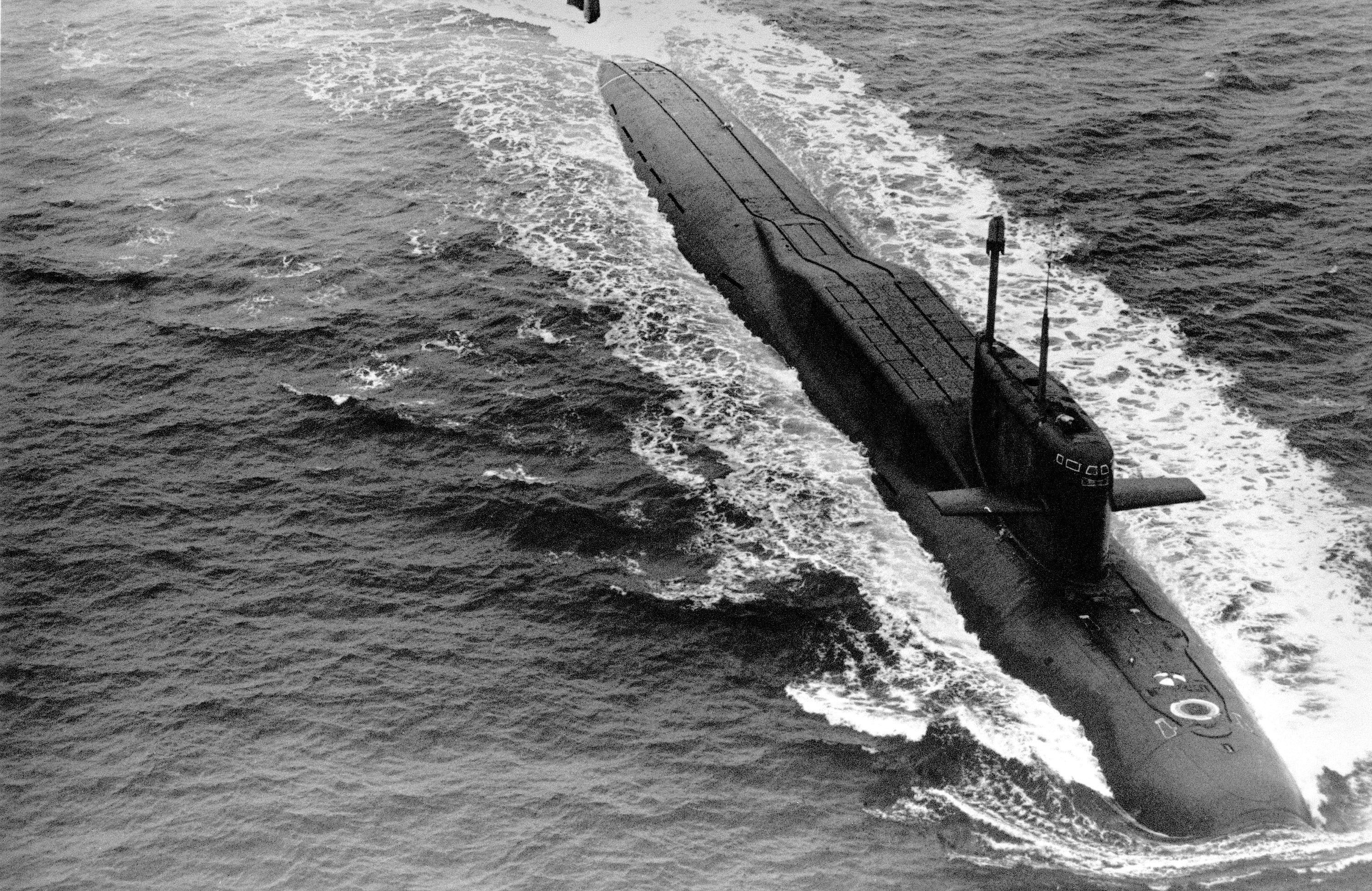
Project 667AM submarine K-140

The first 667A (Yankee) submarine went on an Atlantic patrol in June 1969. 16 months later, in October 1970, SSBNs of this class began patrols in the Pacific, operating in areas from which the U.S. coast was within the range of their missiles. Despite the significantly shorter range of Soviet missiles compared to the American Polaris A-3, all major U.S. coastal cities were within range of the Soviet submarines. From 1971 onward, two 667A submarines were regularly, and occasionally up to four, patrolling the Atlantic within missile range of the U.S., while in the Pacific at least one submarine always kept the United States within range.

During the construction of these submarines, the existing vessels were upgraded: in 1983, they were equipped with the D-5U missile system with R-27U missiles. These missiles extended the possible attack range to 3,000 km (1,900 mi), using either a single warhead or – in a later stage – three MRV (multiple reentry vehicle) warheads targeting the same point, similar to those carried by the Polaris A-3. At that time, all 34 operational submarines received the new D-5U missile system and advanced navigation systems. As a result of these upgrades, the submarines were reclassified as Project 667AU.

Between 1973 and 1976, an earlier Project 667A submarine – K-140 – was modernized at Severodvinsk through the replacement of its missile system with the D-11 system. The missiles comprising this system, the R-31 (NATO: SS-N-17 Snipe), with a range of 3,900 km (2,400 mi), were the first Soviet solid-fueled SLBMs and were intended to demonstrate the Soviet Union's capability to deploy SLBMs using this type of fuel. The modified vessel, renamed Project 667AM K-140, carried 12 ballistic missiles instead of the standard 16. Between 1969 and 1973, the CKB-16 design bureau began a program to develop Project 999 submarines, capable of carrying 16 R-31 missiles. This program ended in failure, and K-140 remained the only Project 667AM submarine – the sole Soviet SLBM platform armed with solid-fueled missiles until 1984, when the R-39 (NATO: SS-N-20 Sturgeon) entered service.

=== Technical problems ===
The liquid-fuel propulsion system used in Soviet missiles of that era caused numerous problems aboard the submarines that carried them. In 1970, a leak occurred aboard K-219, followed by a fire and, ultimately, an explosion at sea. The submarine survived and was brought back to port, where it underwent repairs. However, on 3 October 1986, another accident involving missile fuel took place aboard the same submarine, which was carrying 15 missiles beneath its deck and was cruising about 600 nautical miles (1,100 km; 690 mi) from the Bermuda Islands. The submarine managed to surface, but the onboard fire could not be brought under control. A Soviet merchant ship attempted to tow the vessel, but due to the crew's lack of training, K-219 sank on 6 October 1986, along with four crew members.

=== Delta ===
In 1963, the Soviet Union began work on the advanced D-9 missile system, featuring the liquid-fueled R-29 missile (NATO: SS-N-8 Sawfly). In the same year, CKB-16, under the direction of A. S. Smornov and N. F. Shulchenko, developed preliminary designs for Project 701 submarines with a surface displacement of about 5,000 tons, carrying six R-29 missiles. As a result of these efforts, in 1964 the Soviet Navy decided to extend and rearm K-145 of Project 658/Hotel SSBN with six R-29 missiles, thereby creating the Project 701/Hotel III submarine. The next submarine to be extended and rearmed was K-118 of Project 629/Golf SSB, redesignated as Project 601/Golf III. The conversions were carried out at Severodvinsk, likely also involving the Zvyozdochka shipyard.

Work on an entirely new design to carry the R-29 missile was rejected by the Navy. As a result, in 1965, the CKB-18 design bureau under the direction of Sergey Kovalev began developing Project 667B (Murena class, NATO: Delta I). Project 667B was a scaled-up version of the Project 667A submarine, modified to carry the R-29 missile. Although the new submarines were to carry only 12 missiles (compared to 16 on the 667A submarines), the initial range of the R-29 (4,200 nmi, 7,800 km, 4,800 mi) was expected to enable the Navy to change its strategy and method of conducting operations. When the Delta I submarines entered production at the shipyards in Severodvinsk and Komsomolsk, the United States and the Soviet Union signed the world's first nuclear arms agreement – SALT I. In 1974, the Soviet SSBN construction program surpassed the number of 41 "modern" submarines built by the United States. The following year, the number of missiles carried by Soviet submarines exceeded the number deployed aboard U.S. Navy submarines.

Starting in 1971, construction work on Project 667B submarines (NATO: Delta I) progressed rapidly. That year, the prototype vessel of the class, K-279, began construction in Severodvinsk and was commissioned on 27 December 1972. By 1977, 10 submarines of this type had been built in Severodvinsk and 8 more in Komsomolsk. These submarines had a surface displacement of approximately 9,000 tons and a hull extended by 11 meters compared to the Project 667A boats. In most other respects, the two designs were similar.

While these submarines were being constructed, work also proceeded in parallel on four submarines of the 667BD class (Murena-M type, NATO: Delta II). These boats were slightly larger than the 667B due to the intention to accommodate 16 R-29D missiles (NATO: SS-N-8 Mod 2), which was the rationale behind launching the program. The additional four missiles could be launched in a second salvo, following the initial twelve. As part of the design process, the fourth and fifth sections of the hull were extended by a total of 16 meters (52 ft) to make room for the four extra launch tubes. These modifications increased the displacement by 1,500 tons and reduced the maximum speed by one knot. They also made the submarines too large to be constructed in Komsomolsk, which is located approximately 450 km (280 mi) inland.

=== Project 667BDR ===
The specification for the new class of submarines – designated Delta III by NATO – was presented in 1972. Project 667BDR (Kalmar class) was developed for the D-9R missile system, which carried 16 R-29R missiles. Depending on the warhead type installed, these missiles had a range of between 6,500 and 8,000 km (4,000 and 5,000 mi). The R-29R was the first Soviet sea-launched missile capable of carrying MIRV warheads, with each missile equipped with between three and seven independently targetable warheads. The new missile system allowed any number of the submarine's missiles to be launched in a single salvo.

The first submarine of this project was commissioned in 1976. In total, between 1975 and 1982, 14 units of this type were built at the shipyard in Severodvinsk. At the time the START I treaty was signed in 1991, five 667BDR-class submarines were in service with the Northern Fleet and nine with the Pacific Fleet. By 1995, one submarine from each fleet had been decommissioned. As of 2009, five submarines of this class remained in active service.

== SALT I Treaty ==
Signed in 1972, the SALT I Treaty limited the number of nuclear weapons delivery platforms, including the number of operational units and those under construction as of 26 May 1972. Under this agreement, the United States, which was at the time launching its Trident program, agreed to a limit of 44 ballistic missile submarines carrying a total of 710 SLBMs. The Soviet Union, in turn, accepted a limit of 62 submarines (the number then in service and under construction) equipped with a total of 950 SLBMs. The introduction of new launchers (i.e., on new submarines) required – according to the agreement – the dismantling of an equivalent number of land-based ICBM launchers or other sea-based SLBM launchers, no later than the start date of sea trials of the new submarine. This treaty represented the most significant legal framework limiting the number of warships since the London Naval Treaty of the 1930s. Since SALT I applied only to the United States and the Soviet Union, the latter argued that it did not bind the United Kingdom, France, or China – the other potential adversaries of the Soviet Union, who were also building SSBNs.

== Third-generation systems ==
=== Akula/Typhoon ===
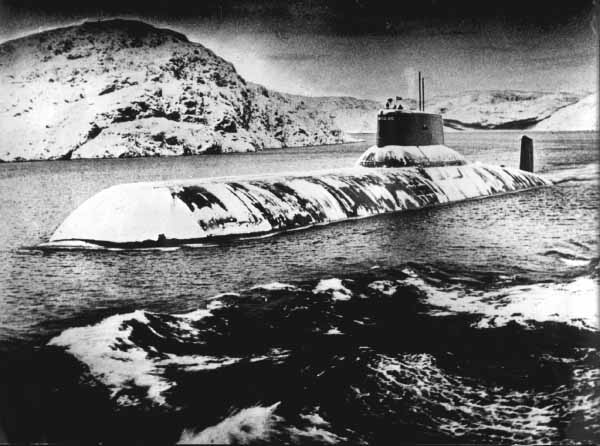
Project 941 submarine

The American Trident submarine program accelerated the construction of third-generation submarines in the Soviet Union. During a meeting between Leonid Brezhnev and President Gerald Ford in November 1974 in Vladivostok, both leaders agreed on the framework for the SALT II treaty, which imposed further limitations on strategic offensive weapons. However, the General Secretary of the Communist Party of the Soviet Union declared that if the United States deployed the Trident system, the Soviet Union would be forced to develop a new strategic submarine program. In reality, the new ballistic missile submarine program – Project 941 – had already begun two years earlier, in 1972, at the Rubin Design Bureau under the direction of Kovalev.

As a result of this program, the Project 941 submarines were created (Akula type; NATO reporting name: Typhoon) – the largest submarines ever built. In Soviet nomenclature, the Akula-class submarines were referred to as heavy strategic nuclear-powered cruisers. Kovalev and his team examined numerous design concepts, including a gigantic 235-metre (771 ft)-long submarine – an idea that was eventually abandoned due to the Soviet Union's lack of dry docks and other facilities capable of accommodating such large vessels. Ultimately, the Rubin Bureau developed a unique and highly innovative design, which was the 941st concept reviewed by the bureau.

In practice, Akula-class submarines are comparable in length to American Ohio-class submarines – 172 meters (564 ft) compared to the latter's 170 meters (560 ft). However, while American submarines have a beam of 11.7 meters (38 ft), the Soviet submarines have a beam of 23.2 meters (76 ft) and a submerged displacement of 48,000 tons – three times greater than that of a Trident submarine. Project 941 submarines had a hydrostatic reserve buoyancy of around 48%, whereas Ohio-class submarines had only about 15%. This reserve helped reduce the vessel's draft and significantly facilitated surfacing through ice, particularly drift ice, to launch missiles. On 25 August 1995, one Project 941 submarine surfaced at the North Pole, breaking through a 2.5-meter-thick layer of ice before launching an R-39 missile.

Project 941 was the first Soviet design to feature a catamaran structure. The submarines were built using two parallel pressure hulls, which housed crew quarters, equipment, and engine rooms. Each hull, measuring 149 meters (489 ft) in length and up to 7.2 meters (24 ft) in diameter, was divided into eight sections. The 20 missile launch tubes were placed in two rows between the pressure hulls, located in the forward part of the vessel (in front of the sail). The control room, missile system command center, and other management compartments were situated in two large modules between the pressure hulls. The command center measured 30 meters (98 ft) in length and 6 meters (20 ft) in diameter. The submarine's sail extended 13 meters (43 ft) above the waterline. An additional module – connecting the pressure hulls – was installed at the front. It housed the torpedo launchers and torpedo storage. Altogether, the Typhoon consisted of seventeen sections enclosed within a massive outer hull measuring 172 meters in length, with all the hulls and modules interconnected via passageways. The pressure hulls, control spaces, and torpedo sections were made of titanium, while the light outer hull was constructed from steel. These submarines offered the best living conditions in the Soviet – and now Russian – navy, including a small gym, solarium, sauna, and even an aviary.

The submarines of this project were equipped with the Skat sonar system, capable of simultaneously tracking 10–12 targets, and included the low-frequency MGK-503 sonar with a spherical array (NATO designation: Shark Gill). Each of the two pressure hulls houses one OK-650 reactor with a steam turbine – a power unit rated at 50,000 horsepower (37 MW) – as well as one 800-kilowatt generator. To protect each of the two propellers from damage or destruction by ice, they were enclosed in special housings. The Typhoon is also equipped with two auxiliary propulsion pods – located at the bow and stern – which can be lowered and activated for maneuvering and for stationary hovering underwater.

The Typhoon-class submarines were armed with the D-19 missile system, equipped with 20 R-39 solid-fuel missiles with a range of 10,000 km (6,200 mi), as well as an automated torpedo-missile system featuring two 650 mm (26 in) launchers and four 533 mm launchers. The propulsion systems of these vessels housed two water-cooled reactors, each with a power output of 190 MW, and two steam turbines, allowing for a submerged speed of 27 knots (50 km/h; 31 mph)s. The submarine featured the most advanced silencing technologies available in the Soviet Union at the time, making Project 941 quieter than any previous Soviet submarines. To reduce noise levels, a two-stage, rubber-coated pneumatic shock-absorbing ring was used, along with a modular design of the submarine's mechanisms and equipment.

The first vessel of this class – TK-208 Dmitry Donskoy – was launched on 23 September 1980, with tests and sea trials beginning in June 1981. The submarine was officially commissioned into the Northern Fleet on 12 December 1981. Following the first unit, five more were constructed. All submarines of this type entered service between 1981 and 1989. They were grouped under the "First Flotilla of Nuclear Submarines" at Zapadnaya Litsa (Nerpichya base).

All submarines of this class have been retired from service. One of them – TK-208 – now serves as an experimental and test vessel (primarily for ballistic missile testing), while the remaining ones are in the process of being dismantled and scrapped, to be replaced by the new Borei-class (Project 955) submarines.

=== Solid-fuel SLBM ===
Preliminary work on an ICBM missile system powered by solid fuel began at the Makeyev Design Bureau of Machine Building in 1971. Development of the first SLBM system using this type of fuel started two years later. Work on the D-19 system equipped with R-39 missiles was initiated in accordance with a decree by the Council of Ministers of the Ukrainian SSR in September 1973. The R-39 was a three-stage solid-fuel missile, with the first and second stage engines enclosed in an epoxy resin casing, and had a range of 8,300 km (5,200 mi). To reduce the missile's size, retractable nozzles were used in the first and second stage engines.

The missile's front section housed the post-booster, containing a navigation system and a liquid-fueled propulsion system for the delivery of ten MIRV warheads. The warheads themselves, featuring a smaller frontal angle than those of previous SLBM warheads, were located in the rear section of the post-booster, surrounding the nose (front section) of the third propulsion stage. The missile was installed in a launch tube, where it was supported from above by a shock-absorbing mechanism. The R-39 was launched using pressurized gas (cold launch), while a special solid-fuel counter-shock system created a gas shroud around the missile to reduce the effects of hydrodynamic pressure during the underwater launch phase. The ignition of the first-stage engine occurred only after the missile had exited the launch tube.

Missile testing began in 1979 with trials conducted from the deck of the submarine K-153 (Project 629/619), followed by tests from land-based launch sites. Out of 17 land-based tests, half ended in failure due to issues with the first and second stage engines. After redesigning the propulsion systems, testing continued from the first Project 941 submarine (TK-208), of which 11 launches were successful.

The D-19 system was officially accepted into service in 1984. Following TK-208, five more submarines of this project were each equipped with 20 missiles of this system. However, the formal commissioning of the R-39 missile did not occur until 1989. Work on the missile's successor, the R-39M, intended both for Project 941 submarines and the future Borei class (Yury Dolgorukiy), began as early as 1980. Flight tests of the R-39M began in 1996, but after four failed attempts, the program was canceled in favor of a new solid-fuel missile, the R-30, developed under the direction of the Moscow Institute of Thermal Technology (MITT) – an organization with no prior experience in designing SLBMs – working in cooperation with the Design Bureau of Machine Building.

=== Delta IV ===
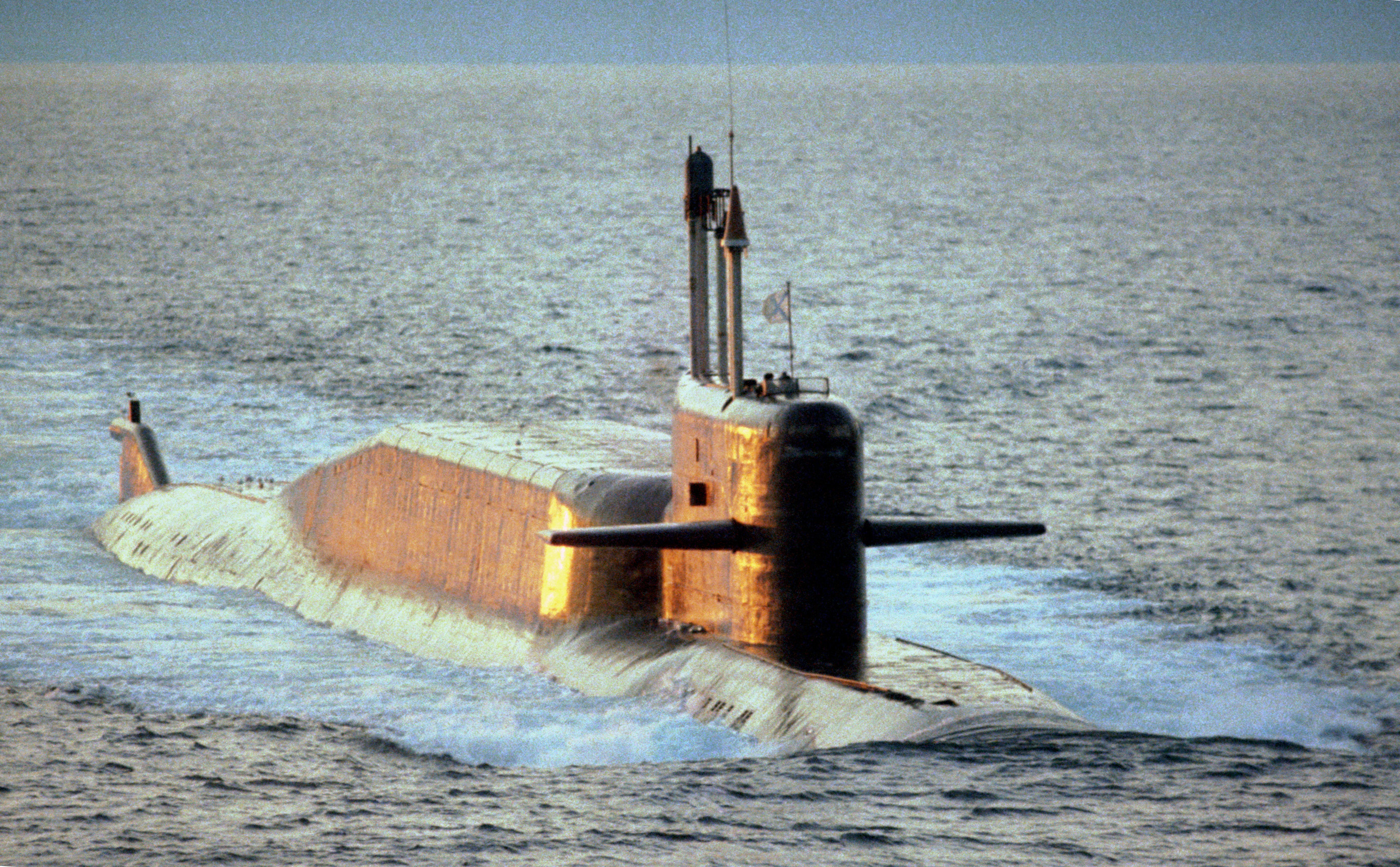
Project 667BDRM submarine

Almost simultaneously with Project 941/Typhoon, Kovalyov's team at the Rubin Design Bureau developed the design for the Project 667BDRM submarines (NATO designation: Delta IV). A decree initiating work on this project was issued on 10 September 1975. While incorporating design solutions from earlier Yankee and Delta classes, these submarines are largely a completely new third-generation design. The vessels are significantly larger than their predecessors – displacing 1,200 tons more and being 12 meters (39 ft) longer. They were equipped with more advanced noise-reduction technologies and carried larger, three-stage, liquid-fueled missiles as part of the D-9RM system: the R-29RM (NATO: SS-N-23 Skiff). To improve structural strength, the pressure hull and bulkheads at both ends were produced using an electro-slag remelting process, which increased the steel's ductility.

Depending on the number of MIRV warheads carried (up to four), the R-29RM missile could strike targets at distances of up to 4,480 nautical miles (8,300 km; 5,160 mi). These missiles could be launched underwater by Delta IV submarines from depths of up to 55 meters (180 ft), at speeds of up to 6 knots.

Just like its predecessors, the Delta IV is powered by two nuclear reactors (VM-4SG) and two propellers, but with an improved stern configuration that results in greater propulsion efficiency and reduced noise levels. One Soviet analyst described the Project 667BDRM submarines as follows:

Second-generation submarines were quieter; however, significant progress in noise reduction by Soviet industry was only achieved in the 1980s, with the advent of the 667BDRM submarines. At that time, new technologies were introduced that improved the precision of the propulsion shaft and propellers by an order of magnitude. A major breakthrough in noise suppression was also achieved through the implementation of active noise-canceling methods.

Among the mentioned active noise-reduction techniques are likely computer-assisted technologies, which theoretically allow for noise suppression by up to 40 dB. Better soundproofing than in other submarines of the 667 series was also achieved by mounting all machinery and equipment within a common frame, isolated from the pressure hull by a special buffer. Additionally, local sound absorbers were installed around power systems, more effective sound-absorbing coatings were applied inside and outside the hull, and five-blade propellers with improved acoustic properties were used. Altogether, this system reduces the noise levels of Delta IV submarines to one-third of those produced by the 667BDR (Delta III) submarines.

The Project 667BDRM submarines were equipped with the TRV-671 RTM missile-torpedo system, consisting of four 533 mm launch tubes. Unlike the system installed on the 667BDR submarines, the 667BDRM vessels received all types of torpedoes, anti-submarine rocket torpedoes, and hydroacoustic decoys. These submarines were also fitted with the Omnibus BDRM combat management system, which provides centralized control over all types of combat operations. This system collects and processes data and facilitates the selection of tactical maneuvers as well as decision-making during combat regarding the use of torpedo or missile-torpedo weapons. The submarines were additionally equipped with the Szljuz navigation system, which ensures the accuracy of position determination necessary for the vessel and its ballistic missile system. Position data updates are performed twice daily using an astro-correction system installed in the periscope. This system is supplemented by a sonar navigation transponder. The sonar system of these submarines is the Skat-BDRM.

== Fourth-generation submarines ==
The Soviet Union, after a temporarily failed SSN program with the Severodvinsk class (Yasen), began construction in November 1996 of a new type of ballistic missile submarine (SSBN) – the Borei class Yury Dolgorukiy. The design of the new Project 955 was developed at the Rubin Design Bureau. Although Borei-class submarines are to be significantly smaller than the Typhoon class, their size exceeds all other Soviet and Russian submarines except for the Granit/Antey SSGN units (Project 949) (NATO: Oscar). The latest plans anticipated introducing a prototype of this project into service in 2009; however, due to failures in the Bulava missile program, the first Borei-class submarine entered service in 2013.

== Soviet system ==
The Soviet Union demonstrated great innovation in the design of submarines and the missile systems they carried. The truth of this statement is best demonstrated by the large number of submarine designs, missiles, as well as propulsion systems, and the pace at which advanced technological solutions were introduced.

In 1963, the operational depth of Soviet submarines significantly increased. The first submarine to use the stronger HY-100 steel in its construction was the prototype USS Seawolf, and this change allowed submarines of this class to return to an operational depth of 400 meters (1,300 ft).

Throughout the Cold War, the primary factor in the technological rivalry between the U.S. and Soviet navies was the degree of submarine silencing. Unlike parameters such as speed and permissible diving depth – where U.S. Navy submarines generally lagged behind their Soviet counterparts – the American navy managed to maintain technological superiority for decades in the field of noise reduction. Submarines of each American generation – both attack (SSN) and ballistic missile (SSBN) types – were significantly quieter than their Soviet equivalents. This advantage often exceeded the gap of a single generation and, in principle, persists to this day. Both sides engaged in a kind of intelligence race, the main goal of which – for the Americans – was to assess Soviet technological progress, and for the Soviets, to obtain the technology itself.

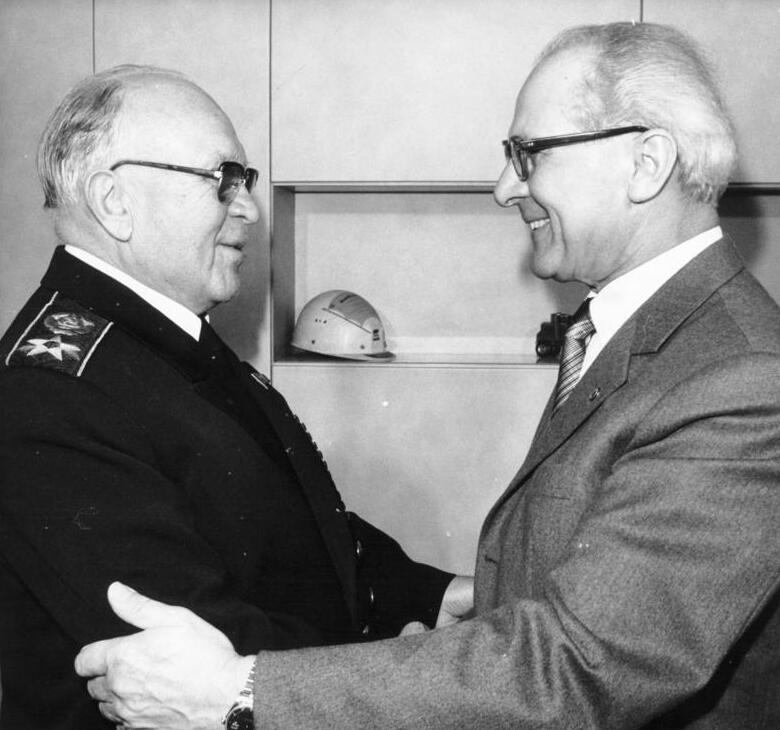
Sergey Gorshkov (on the left)

The two competing sides were divided by the way they organized the support structure of their respective systems. The Soviet approach in this area diverged significantly from Western standards. Both submarines and missiles were designed by several relatively independent design bureaus, each employing a few thousand workers. For instance, the Rubin Design Bureau had about 3,000 employees, Malakhit employed 2,500, and Lazurit around 1,500. Each design bureau operating under a chief designer had considerable autonomy. In the 1980s, the position of chief designer was renamed general designer, reflecting the growing complexity of the projects. The heads of these bureaus had wide-ranging independence, although they still reported to the Ministry of the Shipbuilding Industry, the Military-Industrial Commission, and the Navy's leadership.

The Soviet Navy's strong influence on the design bureaus became evident particularly under Admiral Sergey Gorshkov's leadership. Although the Soviet design bureaus typically had their own areas of specialization, together with cooperating technical and research institutes, they also competed in certain areas – similar to American research labs. This internal competition played a significant role in enabling the Soviet Union to surpass the U.S. in some key submarine performance parameters. Unlike the United States, in the Soviet system, the efficiency of financial expenditures allocated to various programs was not of primary importance.

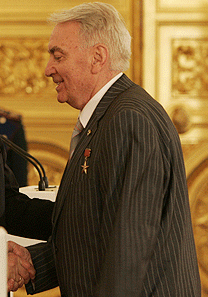
Igor Spassky

Equally significant was the role of the head of the Rubin Design Bureau, Professor Igor Spassky. His influence and ability to operate behind the scenes enabled him to secure a leading position for his bureau in the design of naval vessels. During his tenure at Rubin, the heads of other design bureaus changed several times. Among Spassky's achievements was pushing through the production of Project 941 Typhoon-class submarines and Project 949 SSGN cruise missile submarines (NATO reporting name: Oscar). The production of these enormous vessels met with resistance from some senior naval officers, government representatives, and industrial rivals. Their objections were primarily based on the high cost of construction and the availability of raw materials. However, Spassky was able to use his influence to push his own designs through to production.

=== Industry ===
The fundamental problem of the Soviet system for the design, construction, and maintenance of nuclear submarines was the poor quality of materials used, as well as the lack of adequate support infrastructure. Quality issues were a widespread problem across all branches of the Soviet armed forces, often causing frustration at the highest levels of government. At one point, Nikita Khrushchev asked: "When they [the Americans] begin serial production, they don't produce defective parts. What prevents us from doing the same?!". As a result, although in some respects Soviet hull construction technologies surpassed those used in the United States, the outstanding performance parameters of Soviet submarines were, in many cases, merely theoretical. To mitigate the negative consequences of poor quality, Soviet submarines had more complex structures with a greater number of compartments. On the one hand, this increased the survivability of both the vessel and its crew; on the other, it led to the production of submarines requiring more extensive maintenance. The latter aspect is particularly significant, as it highlighted another issue faced by the Soviet Navy – the shortage of adequately qualified personnel.

Production of nuclear ballistic-missile submarines in the Soviet Union was concentrated at two yards: Plant No. 402 – today's Severnoye Mashinostroitelnoye Predpriyatiye in Severodvinsk – and Plant No. 199 (the Lenin Komsomol Shipyard), now the Amur Shipbuilding Plant in Komsomolsk-on-Amur.

=== Operations ===
The Soviet Union typically maintained no more than 15% of its SSBNs at sea at any one time. Most of the remaining force was kept in a state of readiness to deploy, though at a relatively low level of strategic alert.

The Soviet Navy conducted a dozen or so large-scale exercises to demonstrate the effectiveness of this operational model. It was based on the assumption that Soviet intelligence would provide timely warning of a potential conflict with the West, and that rapid deployment of fully armed forces following such a warning would be more efficient than maintaining a high percentage of the fleet in constant operational readiness. However, this approach did not favor systematic and intensive training of crews in operational conditions, which meant Soviet submarine crews had significantly less operational experience than their American counterparts.

Closely tied to operational issues were the challenges faced by the Soviet maintenance infrastructure in supporting new submarine designs. In some cases, the demands placed by new submarine classes were so unique that a decade or more could pass before the necessary support equipment became available to service the new vessels. According to American intelligence at the time, these deficiencies in Soviet maintenance capabilities led to more rapid wear and tear on the submarines. As Vice Admiral Thomas A. Brooks, former Director of Naval Intelligence for the U.S. Navy, observed: "They didn't have enough facilities to conduct overhauls at the required frequency". The problem was further compounded by the sheer number of different submarine classes (projects), which made both production and in-service maintenance more complicated.

=== Human resources ===
Soviet engineering personnel were highly narrowly specialized. In the field of undersea weapons, Soviet submarines tended to be more specialized. Human resource issues also had an impact on submarine design itself. Due to the size of the submarine fleet, the Soviet Navy required a large number of personnel, recruited and trained through a conscription system that was not always efficient. In a system based on short-term conscripts and mostly professional officers, it was difficult to establish a coherent and competent human base for the fleet – issues that plagued the Soviet Navy until the very end of the Soviet Union.

Senior Soviet officers worked in a system that prioritized quantity over quality. They often deliberately altered statistics, favoring appearances over reality. By falsifying data or reports, they covered up facts instead of showing initiative to fix shortcomings. The scale of this problem was recognized by many of the highest-ranking officers and submarine designers, which led to the conclusion that the best solution under such conditions would be to maximize submarine automation. The most important designers believed that removing the human factor from the most critical components of a submarine was the key to increasing the unit's safety.

== Bibliography ==
- Polmar, Norman (2003). Cold War Submarines, The Design and Construction of U.S. and Soviet Submarines. Potomac Books. ISBN 1-57488-530-8.
