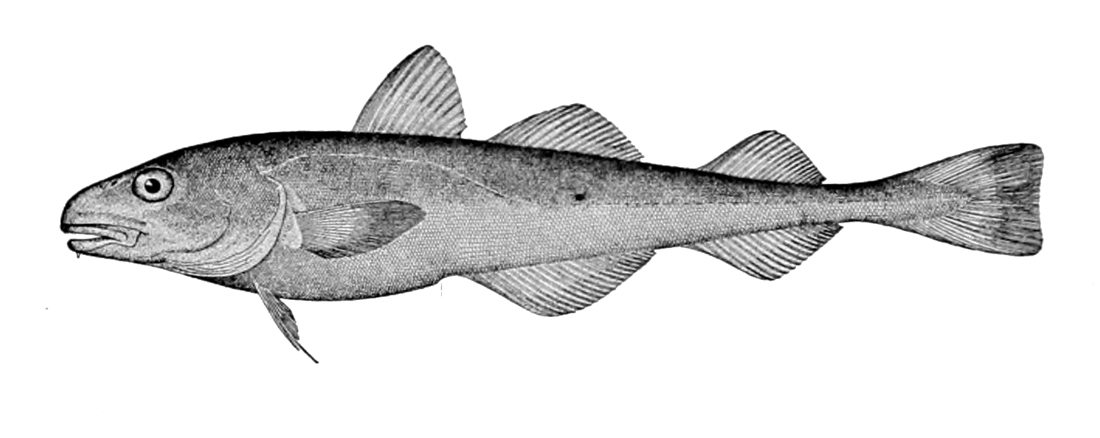

Scientific classification
- Kingdom: Animalia
- Phylum: Chordata
- Class: Actinopterygii
- Order: Gadiformes
- Family: Gadidae
- Genus: Eleginus
- Species: E. nawaga

Binomial name
- Eleginus nawaga (Walbaum, 1792)

Synonyms
- Gadus nawaga Walbaum, 1792

= Navaga =

Species of fish

The navaga (Eleginus nawaga) is a relatively small species of fish in the cod family Gadidae. It inhabits the European arctic and subarctic waters of the Barents, White, and Kara seas, from the Kola Bay to the Ob River estuary.

Navaga fish usually occur at shallow depths, along shores with soft bottoms, close to the ice and on the continental shelf. In winter, they live in nearshore waters, where spawning takes place. They are often found in estuaries and can enter fresh water in rivers. In summer, they return to open waters. They feed on crustaceans, benthic animals, and small fish. They can grow to at least to 42 cm but typical adult size is smaller, being only 15–25 cm in the White Sea.

The navaga is commercially fished mainly in the winter in the bays of the White Sea. The European navaga is a close relative of the saffron cod (E. gracilis), a Pacific sister species.
