= Yankee-class submarine =

Soviet ballistic missile submarine class

- Yankee class SSBN profile

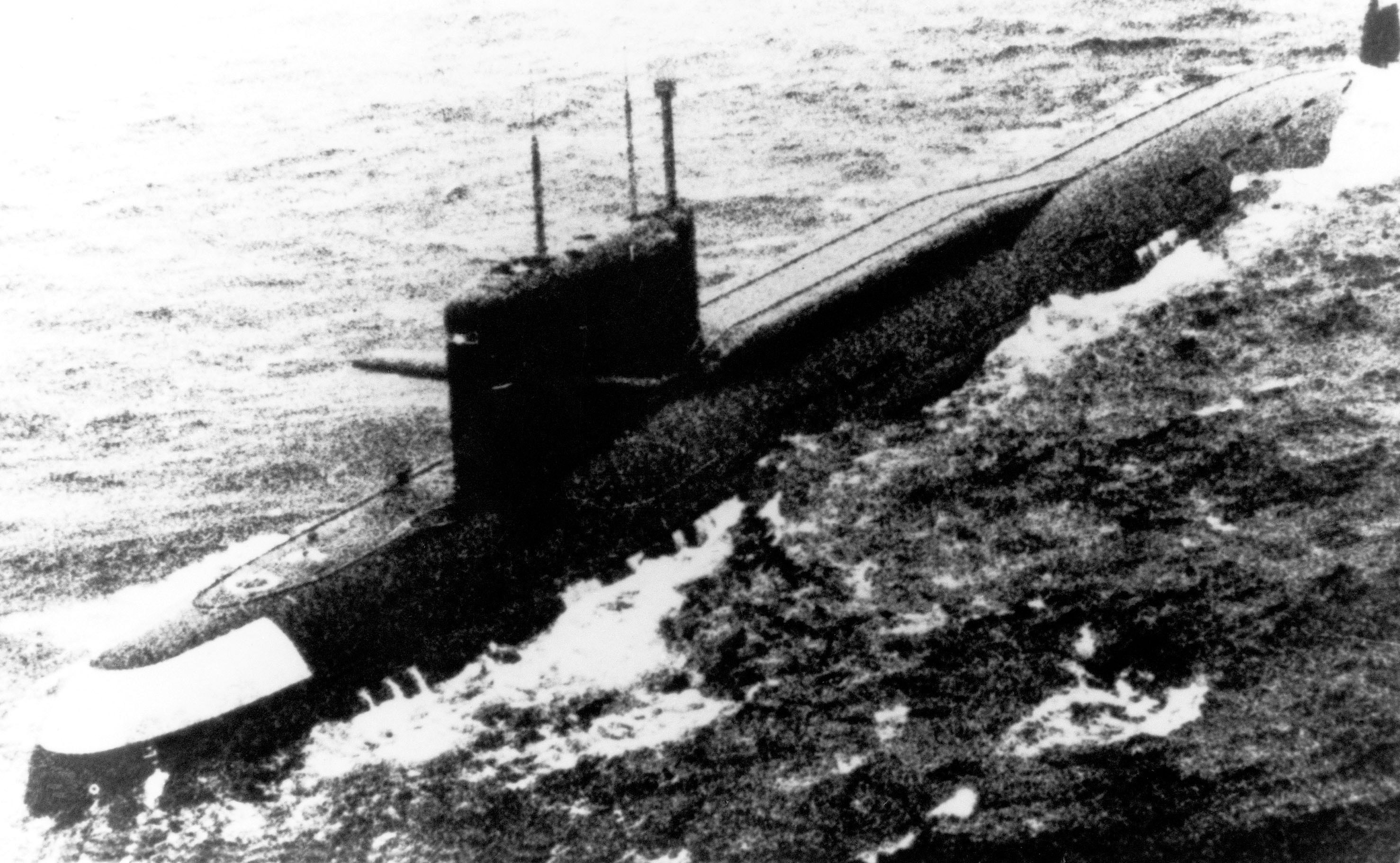
- A Yankee I-class submarine underway

Class overview
- Name: Yankee class
- Builders: Severodvinsk and Komsomolsk
- Operators: Soviet Navy
- Preceded by: 658
- Succeeded by: 667B
- Built: 1964–1974
- In commission: 1967–1995
- Completed: 34
- Lost: 1
- Retired: 33

General characteristics
- Type: Ballistic missile submarine
- Displacement: 7,700 tons surfaced; 9,300 tons submerged
- Length: 132 m (433 ft 1 in)
- Beam: 11.7 m (38 ft 5 in)
- Draught: 8 m (26 ft 3 in)
- Propulsion: two VM-4 pressurized water cooled reactors powering four steam turbines driving two shafts.
- Speed: Surfaced: 13 knots (24 km/h; 15 mph); Submerged: 27 knots (50 km/h; 31 mph)
- Range: Unlimited
- Complement: 120
- Armament: Yankee I/II: 4 × 533 mm (21.0 in) torpedo tubes; 2 × 400 mm (16 in) torpedo tubes; Yankee I: 16 × R-27 (SS-N-6 Serb) SLBMs; Yankee II: 12 × R-31 (SS-N-17 Snipe) SLBMs

The Soviet Navy's Project 667A Navaga (navaga) and Project 667AU Nalim (burbot) (NATO reporting name: Yankee), were a family of nuclear-powered ballistic missile submarines built in the Soviet Union. In total, 34 units were built, from 1964 to 1974: 24 in Severodvinsk for the Northern Fleet and the remaining 10 in Komsomolsk-on-Amur for the Pacific Fleet. Two Northern Fleet units were later transferred to the Pacific.

The Yankee-class were subject to a wide variety of modifications; these ships have a different designation to the original model.

== Design ==
The Yankee-class nuclear submarines were the first class of Soviet ballistic missile submarines (SSBN) to have thermonuclear firepower comparable with that of their American and British Polaris submarine counterparts. The Yankee class were quieter in the ocean than were their Hotel-class predecessors, and had better streamlining that improved their underwater performance. The Yankee class were actually quite similar to the Polaris submarines of the U.S. Navy and the Royal Navy. These boats were all armed with 16 submarine-launched ballistic missiles (SLBM) with multiple nuclear warheads as nuclear deterrents during the Cold War, and their ballistic missiles had ranges from 1,500–2,500 nautical miles (2,800–4,600 km; 1,700–2,900 mi).

== General characteristics (Yankee I) ==
- Length: 128 m (419 ft 11 in)
- Beam: 11.7 m (38 ft 5 in)
- Draught: 8 m (26 ft 3 in)
- Surface displacement: 7,760 tonnes
- Full (Diving) displacement: 11,500 tonnes
- Speed: 28 knots (52 km/h; 32 mph)
- Power plant: 2 VM-4 reactors
- Hull: Low magnetic steel
- Crew: 114
- Compartments: 10
- Armament:
  - 4 21 in (530 mm) torpedo tubes for 14 Type 53 torpedoes or mines.
  - 2 16 in (410 mm) torpedo tubes for 4 Type 40 torpedoes
  - 16 SS-N-6 liquid-fueled ballistic missiles

== Operational history ==
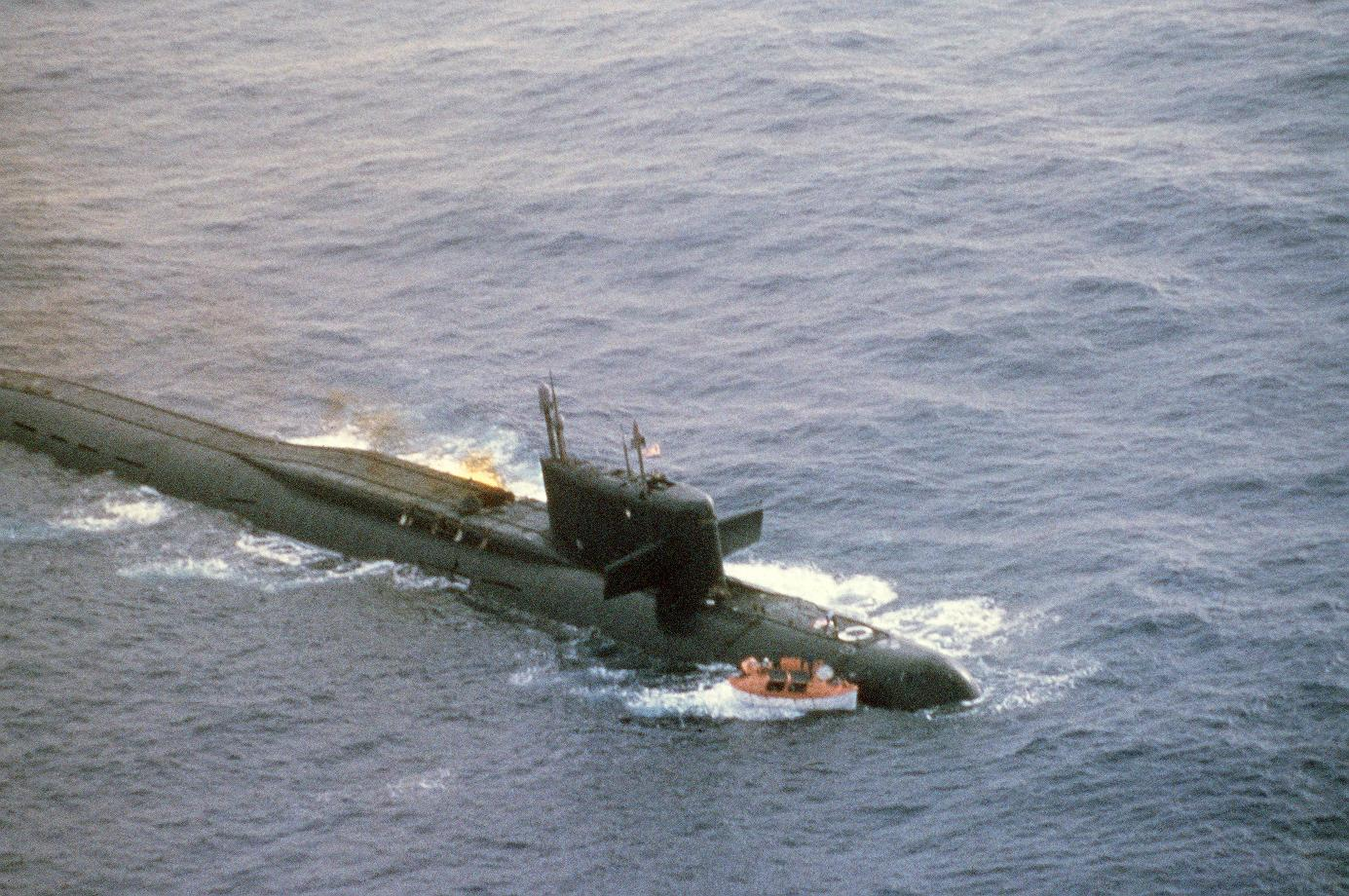
K-219 damaged

The Yankee-class SSBNs served in the Soviet Navy in three oceans: the Atlantic Ocean, the Pacific Ocean, and the Arctic Ocean beginning in the 1960s. During the 1970s about three Yankee-class were continually on patrol in a so-called "patrol box" in the Atlantic Ocean just east of Bermuda and off the US Pacific coast. This forward deployment of the SSBNs was seen to balance the presence of American, British, and French nuclear weapons kept in Western Europe and on warships (including nuclear submarines) in the surrounding Atlantic Ocean, including the Mediterranean Sea and the Eastern Atlantic.

The lead boat K-137 Leninets received its honorific name on 11 April 1970, two and one half years after being commissioned. One Yankee-class submarine, K-219, was lost on 6 October 1986 after an explosion and fire on board. This boat had been at sea near Bermuda, and she sank from loss of buoyancy because of flooding. Four of her sailors died before rescue ships arrived. The events surrounding the loss of this boat has continued to be controversial.

At least one other boat in this class was involved in a collision with a U.S. Navy nuclear submarine.

Because of their increasing age, and as negotiated in the SALT I, START I and START II treaties that reduce nuclear armaments of the United States and the Soviet Union, all boats of Yankee class were disarmed, decommissioned and sent to the nuclear ship scrapyards.

== Variants ==
There were eight different versions of the Yankee-class submarines:

Yankee-class submarines
First entered service	NATO reporting name	Project name and number	Image	Class	Main payload	Numbers built	Notes
1967	Yankee-I	667А "Навага"		SSBN	16 × Р-27 Зыбь	34	Baseline; first Soviet sub to carry SLBMs in hull, as opposed to the sail. Some were later disarmed and operated as SSNs; sometimes classed as SSNX
1975	Improved Yankee-I	667АУ "Налим"		SSBN	16 × Р-27У	13 converted	У/U for Improved (Russian: Улучшен; Uluchshen)
1977	Yankee-II	667АМ "Навага-М"		SSBN	12 × Р-31	1 converted	First Soviet sub to carry solid-fueled SLBMs. Subsequently theorized as emergency satellite-launcher or to strike ships in aircraft carrier battle groups
1987	Yankee Notch	667АТ "Груша"		SSGN/SSN	32-40 × РК-55 Гранат (SS-N-21 Sampson)	3 converted + 4 unfinished	Lengthened by 12 metres (39 ft 4 in) to 141.5 m (464 ft 3 in); 8 more torpedo tubes in waist
1989 (program cancelled)	Yankee Sidecar	667М "Андромеда"		SSGN	12 × П-750 Метеорит (SS-NX-24 Scorpion)	1 converted	Delivered as an attack sub due to missile program cancellation. 153 m (502 ft 0 in) long, 13,650 tons full displacement
1984	Yankee Pod	667АК "Аксон-1"		SSAN	Towed array sonar, pod, other sensor systems	1 converted	K-403 Kazan. The tailfin-pod is similar to those of the Щука- and Щука-Б SSNs
1996	Yankee Big Nose	09780 "Аксон-2"		SSAN	Towed array sonar, Irtysh-Amphora spherical sonar array	1 converted + 1 unfinished (K-415)	Further modified K-403 Kazan. Tail now resembles those of the 667BDRM and 949А submarines. The Irtysh-Amphora would later equip the lead boat of the Yasen class
1991	Yankee Stretch	09774/667АН		"Research" submarine	Палтус-class midget submarine	1 converted (K-411)	160 m (524 ft 11 in) long. Stated to be an oceanographic vessel, but believed to be a spy sub similar to USS Jimmy Carter

Yankee-class submarines in life

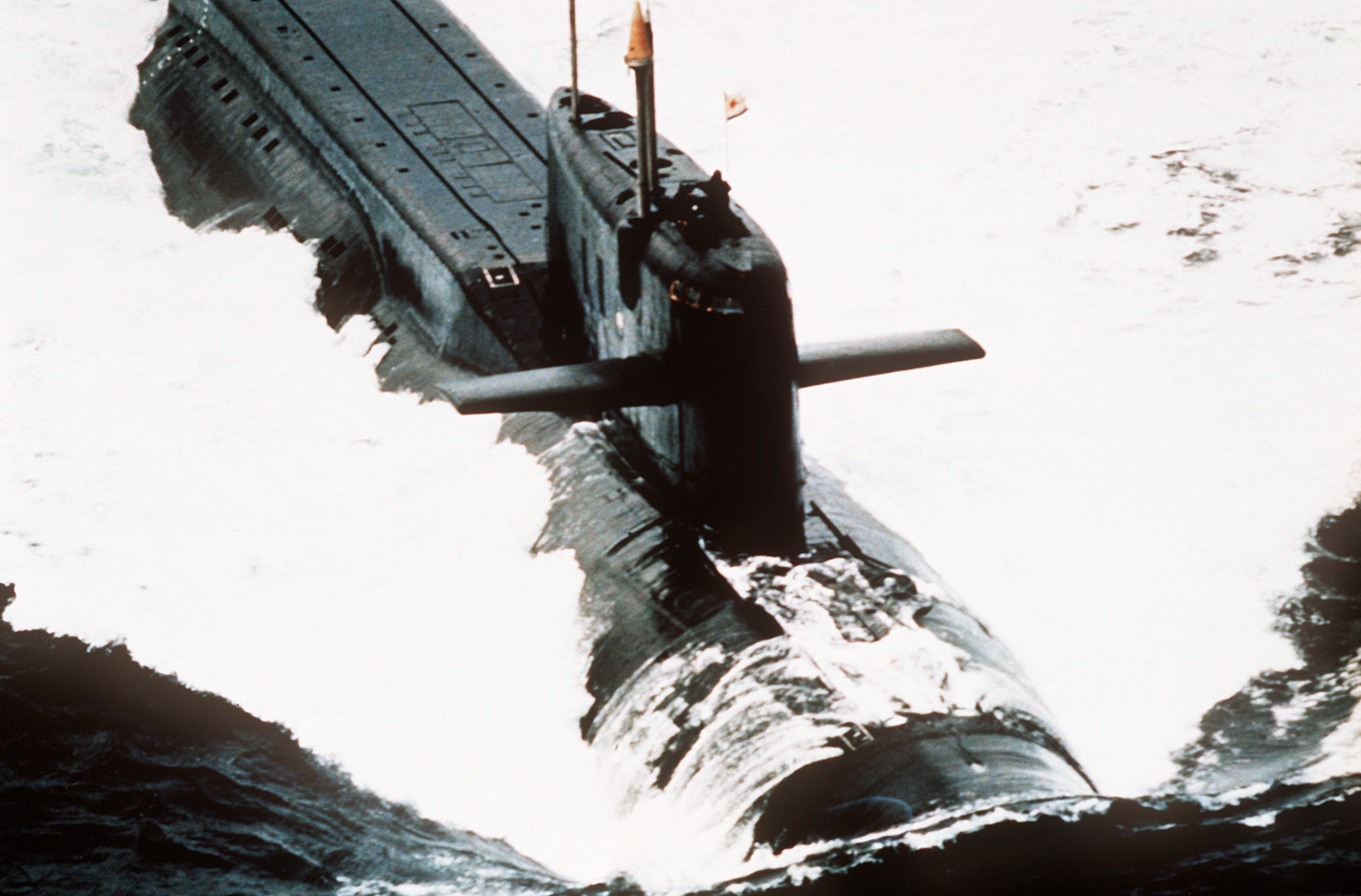
Yankee Notch

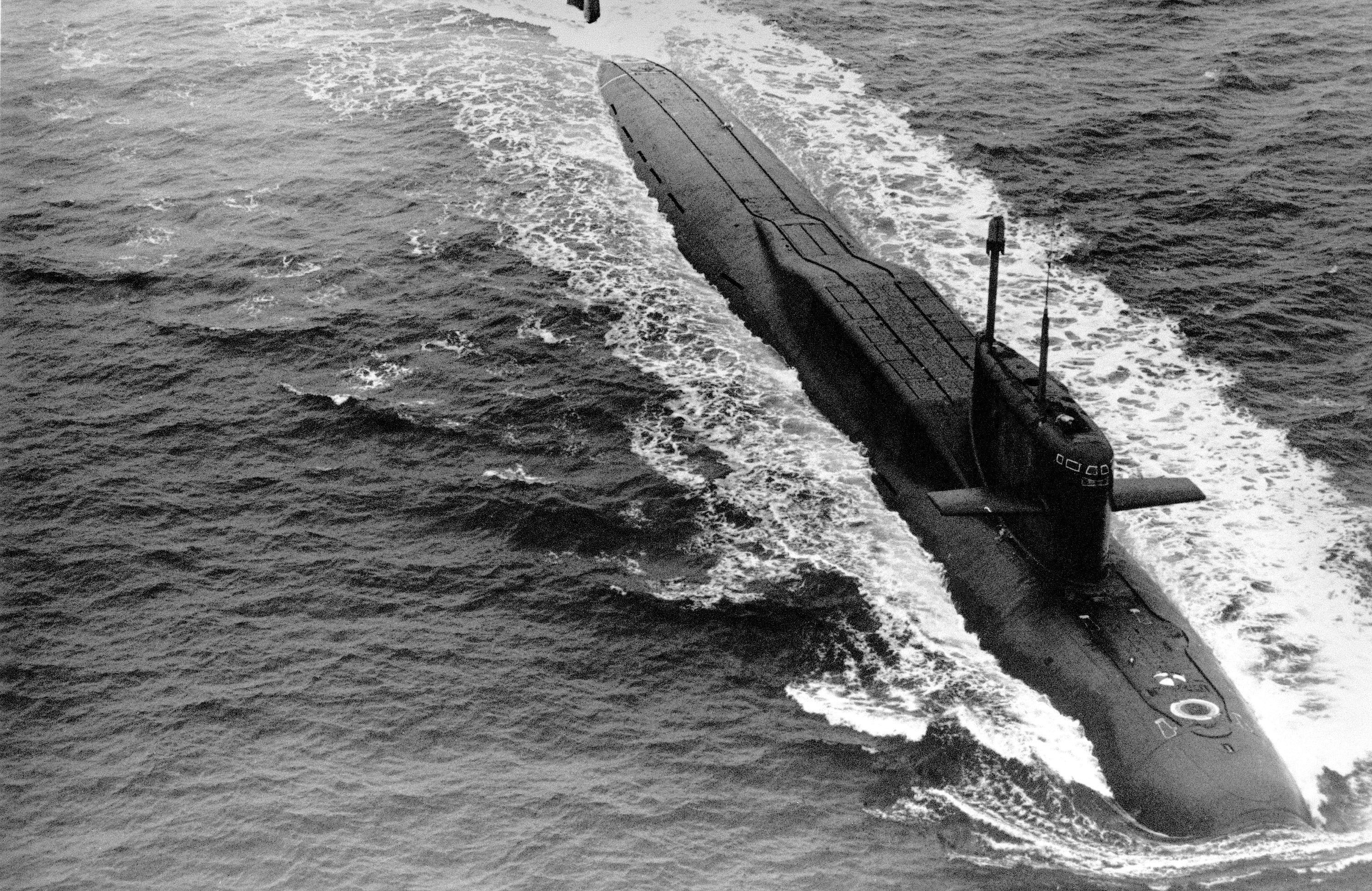
Yankee II

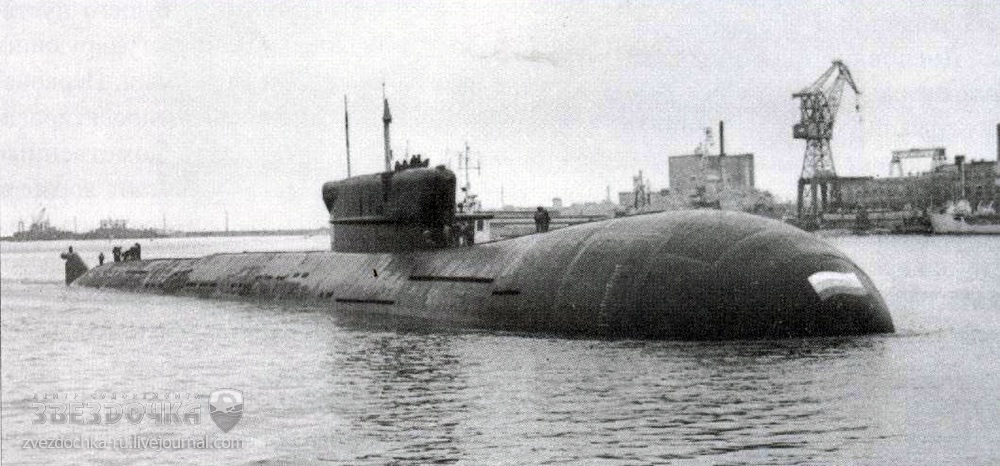
Yankee Big Nose

In addition, Soviet/Russian classification includes the Delta-class submarines within the same family of Project 667; Deltas being Project 667B onward.

=== Units ===
Yankee class — significant dates
#	Project	Shipyard	Laid down	Launched	Commissioned	Status
K-137	667A, 667AU	SEVMASH, Severodvinsk	4 November 1964	11 September 1966	6 November 1967	Decommissioned 3 April 1994 for scrapping
K-140	667A, 667AM	SEVMASH, Severodvinsk	19 September 1965	23 August 1967	30 December 1967	Decommissioned 19 April 1990 for scrapping
K-26	667A	SEVMASH, Severodvinsk	30 December 1965	23 December 1967	3 September 1968	Decommissioned 17 July 1988 for scrapping
K-32	667A	SEVMASH, Severodvinsk	25 February 1966	25 April 1968	26 October 1968	Decommissioned 19 April 1990 for scrapping
K-216	667A	SEVMASH, Severodvinsk	6 June 1966	6 August 1968	27 December 1968	Decommissioned 1985 for scrapping
K-207	667A	SEVMASH, Severodvinsk	4 November 1966	20 September 1968	30 May 1968	Decommissioned 30 May 1989 for scrapping
K-210	667A	SEVMASH, Severodvinsk	16 December 1966	29 December 1968	6 August 1969	Decommissioned 17 July 1988 for scrapping
K-249	667A	SEVMASH, Severodvinsk	18 March 1967	30 March 1969	27 September 1969	Decommissioned 17 July 1988 for scrapping
K-253	667A, 667AT	SEVMASH, Severodvinsk	26 June 1967	5 June 1969	28 November 1969	Decommissioned for scrapping
K-395	667A, 667AT	SEVMASH, Severodvinsk	8 September 1967	28 July 1969	5 December 1969	Decommissioned for scrapping
K-339	667A	Leninskiy Komsomol Shipyard, Komsomolsk	23 February 1968	23 June 1969	24 December 1969	Decommissioned 19 April 1990 for scrapping
K-408	667A, 667AT	SEVMASH, Severodvinsk	20 January 1968	10 September 1969	25 December 1969	Decommissioned 17 July 1988 for scrapping
K-411	667A, 667AN	SEVMASH, Severodvinsk	25 May 1968	16 January 1970	31 August 1970	Decommissioned for scrapping
K-418	667A	SEVMASH, Severodvinsk	29 June 1968	14 March 1970	22 September 1970	Decommissioned 17 March 1989 for scrapping
K-420	667A, 667M	SEVMASH, Severodvinsk	12 October 1968	25 April 1970	29 October 1970	Decommissioned for scrapping
K-423	667A, 667AT	SEVMASH, Severodvinsk	13 January 1969	7 April 1970	13 November 1970	Decommissioned for scrapping
K-434	667AU	Leninskiy Komsomol Shipyard, Komsomolsk	23 February 1969	29 May 1970	30 November 1970	Decommissioned 17 March 1989 for scrapping
K-426	667A	SEVMASH, Severodvinsk	17 April 1969	28 August 1970	22 December 1970	Decommissioned 19 April 1990 for scrapping
K-236	667AU	Leninskiy Komsomol Shipyard, Komsomolsk	6 November 1969	4 August 1970	27 December 1970	Decommissioned 1 September 1990 for scrapping
K-415	667A, 667AK-2	SEVMASH, Severodvinsk	4 July 1969	26 September 1970	30 December 1970	Decommissioned 6 August 1987 for scrapping
K-403	667A, 667AK-1	SEVMASH, Severodvinsk	18 August 1969	25 March 1971	12 August 1971	Decommissioned for scrapping
K-389	667A	Leninskiy Komsomol Shipyard, Komsomolsk	26 July 1970	27 June 1971	25 November 1971	Decommissioned 19 April 1990 for scrapping
K-245	667AU	SEVMASH, Severodvinsk	16 October 1969	9 August 1971	16 December 1971	Decommissioned 14 March 1992 for scrapping
K-219	667AU	SEVMASH, Severodvinsk	28 May 1970	8 October 1971	31 December 1971	Lost 3 October 1986
K-252	667A	Leninskiy Komsomol Shipyard, Komsomolsk	25 December 1970	12 September 1971	31 December 1971	Decommissioned 17 March 1989 for scrapping
K-214	667AU	SEVMASH, Severodvinsk	19 February 1970	1 September 1971	8 February 1972	Decommissioned 24 June 1991 for scrapping
K-228	667AU	SEVMASH, Severodvinsk	4 September 1970	3 May 1972	30 September 1972	Decommissioned 3 September 1994 for scrapping
K-258	667AU	Leninskiy Komsomol Shipyard, Komsomolsk	30 March 1971	26 May 1972	30 September 1972	Decommissioned 16 June 1991 for scrapping
K-241	667AU	SEVMASH, Severodvinsk	24 December 1970	9 June 1972	23 October 1972	Decommissioned 16 June 1992 for scrapping
K-444	667AU	SEVMASH, Severodvinsk	8 April 1971	1 August 1972	23 December 1972	Decommissioned 30 September 1994 for scrapping
K-446	667AU	Leninskiy Komsomol Shipyard, Komsomolsk	7 November 1971	8 August 1972	22 January 1973	Decommissioned 17 March 1993 for scrapping
K-451	667AU	SEVMASH, Severodvinsk	23 February 1972	29 April 1973	7 September 1971	Decommissioned 16 June 1991 for scrapping
K-436	667AU	Leninskiy Komsomol Shipyard, Komsomolsk	7 November 1972	25 July 1973	5 December 1973	Decommissioned 14 March 1992 for scrapping
K-430	667AU	Leninskiy Komsomol Shipyard, Komsomolsk	27 July 1973	28 July 1974	25 December 1974	Decommissioned 12 January 1995 for scrapping

== Bibliography ==
- Pavlov, A. S. (1997). Warships of the USSR and Russia 1945–1995. Naval Institute Press. ISBN 1-55750-671-X.
- Polmar, Norman (2026). Submarines of the Russian and Soviet Navies: 1946–2026. Schiffer Publishing. ISBN 978-0-7643-7083-0.
- Polmar, Norman & Noot, Jurrien (1991). Submarines of the Russian and Soviet Navies, 1718–1990. Naval Institute Press. ISBN 0-87021-570-1.
