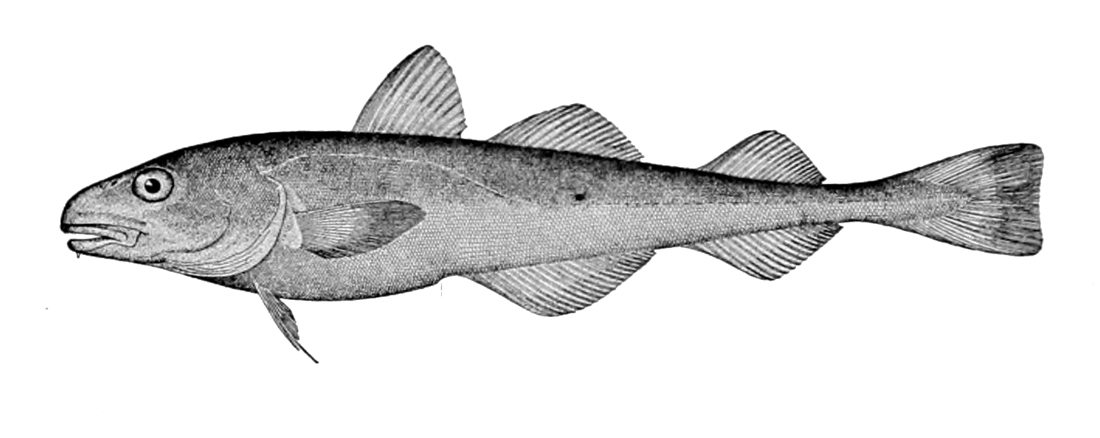
- Navaga (E. nawaga)

Scientific classification
- Kingdom: Animalia
- Phylum: Chordata
- Class: Actinopterygii
- Division: Teleostei
- Order: Gadiformes
- Family: Gadidae
- Genus: Eleginus; G. Fischer, 1813

Type species
- Gadus nawaga Walbaum, 1792

Synonyms
- Pleurogadus Bean, 1885; Tilesia Swainson, 1838

= Eleginus =

Genus of fishes

Eleginus is a genus of cods. There are two recognized species:

- Eleginus gracilis (Tilesius, 1810) (saffron cod)
- Eleginus nawaga (Walbaum, 1792) (navaga)
