= Kh-80 =

Kh-80 (NATO reporting name: AS-X-19 Koala)
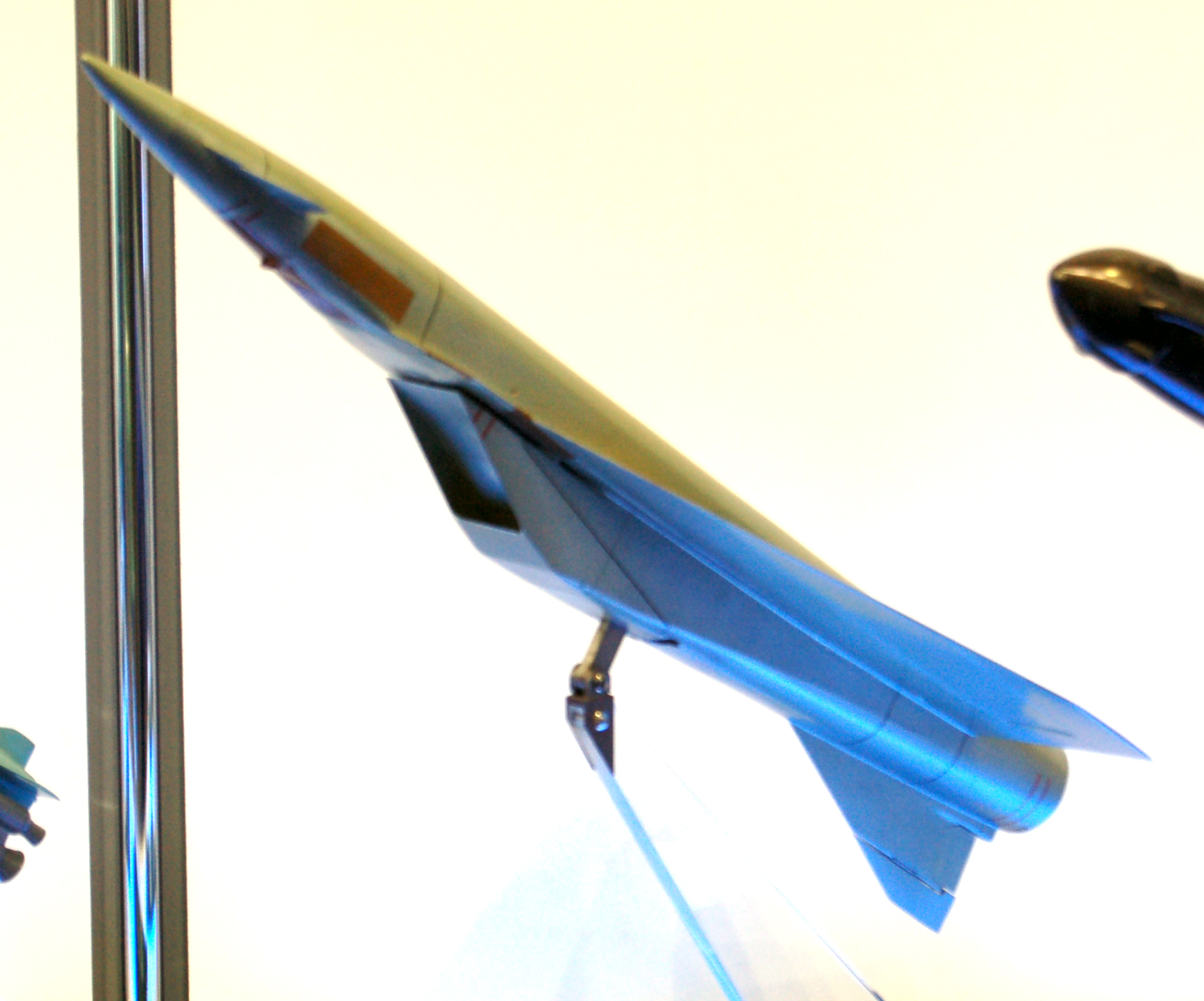
- Kh-80 at MAKS 2009
- Type: Supersonic cruise missile
- Place of origin: Russia

Production history
- Manufacturer: NPO Mashinostroyeniya, MKB Raduga, KBKhA КБХА Химавтоматика, NPO Hartron НПО Хартрон

Specifications
- Mass: 6,380 kg (6.4 ton)
- Length: 12.8 m 3M25A (12.5 m 3M25)
- Diameter: 0.9 m
- Wingspan: 5.1 m
- Warhead: various HE FAE TBX, TNW (200 kt to < 6 Mt)
- Warhead weight: ± ~ 1,000 kg (1 ton)
- Engine: liquid RD-0242, KR-23 KR-93 solid booster or ramjet ПВРД НПВО Пламя ОКБ-670 М.Бондарюк
- Propellant: solid booster, liquid
- Operational range: around 3,000 Km
- Maximum speed: Mach 3 (3,500 Km/h)
- Guidance system: INS, TERCOM, Active radar homing with mid-course datalink
- Launch platform: Fixed-wing jet fighter, coastal TEL vehicle, ship, submarine

The Kh-80 Meteorit-A (GRAU-code: 3M25A, NATO: AS-X-19 Koala), the RK-75 Meteorit-N (GRAU: 3M25N, NATO: SS-NX-24 Scorpion) and the P-750 Meteorit-M (Russian: П-750 Гром, GRAU: 3М25, NATO: SSC-X-5) was a Soviet cruise missile which was supposed to replace subsonic intermediate range missiles in Soviet inventory.

Development of three variants of this cruise missile was authorized on 9 December 1976. The Meteorit-M strategic version would be deployed from Project 667M submarines with 12 launchers per boat. The air-launched Meteorit-A would be launched from Tu-95 bombers. The land-based version was designated Meteorit-N. The missile was also sometimes referred to by the code-name Grom. The first test launch, on 20 May 1980, was unsuccessful, as were the next three attempts. The first successful flight did not come until 16 December 1981. The first launch from a 667M Andromeda submarine took place on 26 December 1983 from the Barents Sea.

The missile was designed by Chelomei at NPO Mashinostroeniye and designated the SSC-X-5 GLCM by the US Department of Defense. The turbojet-powered missile would cruise at Mach 2.5 to Mach 3.0 at 20 km (max 24) altitude over its 3,000 km range. It was equipped with a 1 Mt thermonuclear warhead and used inertial navigation with mid-course update via data link.

Manufacturer: Chelomei. Maximum range: 3,000 km (1,900 mi) to 5,000 km.

== Variants ==
- Meteorit-A Kh-80 Meteorit-A, 3M25A AS-X-19 Koala Basing airborne
- Meteorit-M P-750 Grom 3M25 and 3M25 П-750 Гром SS-NX-24 Scorpion Basing in submarines
- Meteorit-N RK-75 Meteorit-N SSC-X-5 Scorpion 3M25N Basing ground
