= R-27 (ballistic missile) =

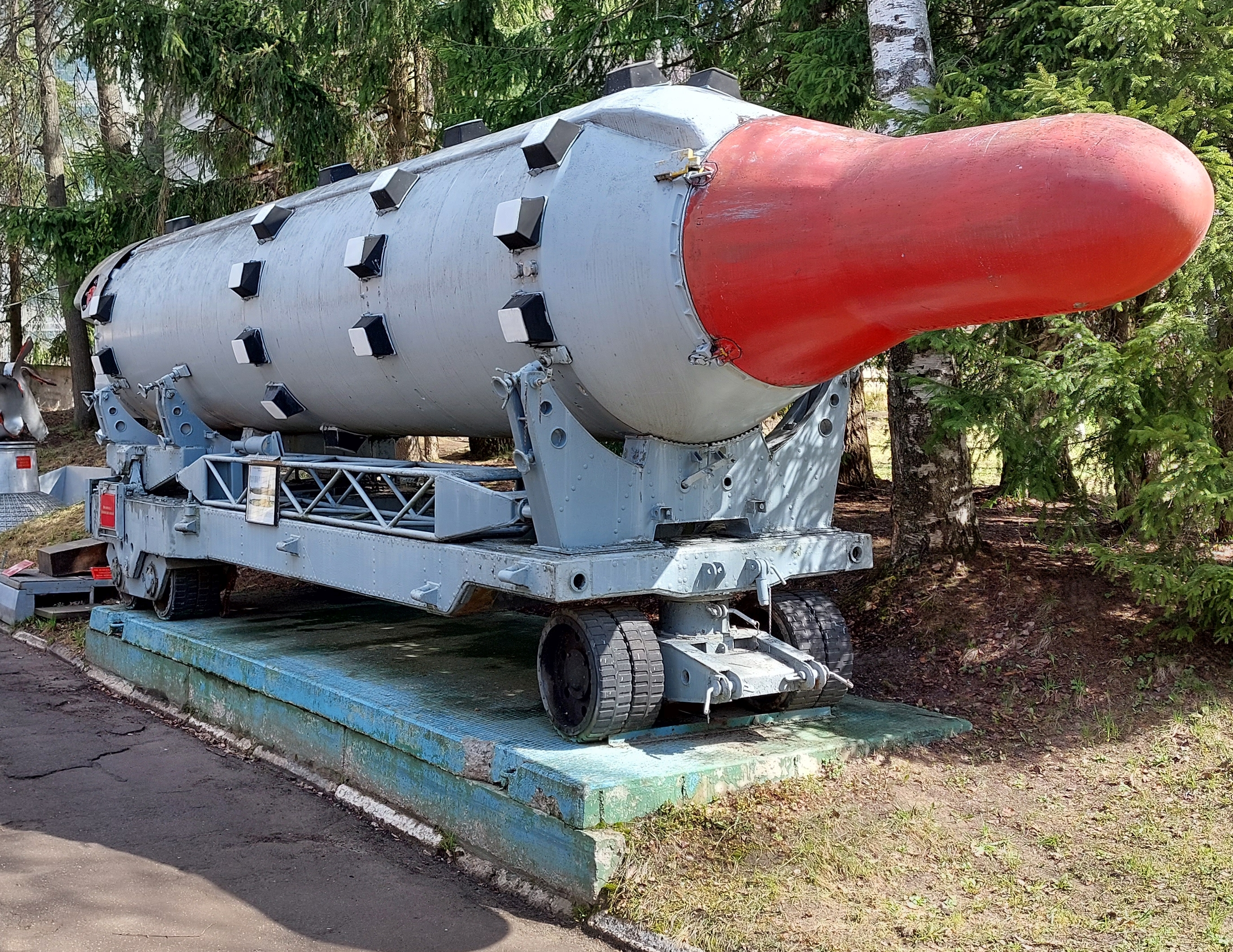
- R-27 missile at Korolyov Rocket and Space Technics Museum, Peresvet
- Place of origin: Soviet Union

Service history
- In service: 1968–1988
- Used by: Soviet Navy

Production history
- Designer: Makeyev Rocket Design Bureau
- Designed: 1962–1968
- Manufacturer: Zlatoust Machine-Building Plant; Krasnoyarsk Machine-Building Plant
- No. built: ~1,800 produced
- Variants: R-27; R-27U; R-27K

Specifications
- Mass: R-27/R27-U: 14,200 kg (31,300 lb); R-27K: 13,250 kg (29,210 lb)
- Length: R-27/R27-U: 8.890 m (29.17 ft); R-27K: 9.000 m (29.528 ft)
- Diameter: R-27/R27-U/R-27K: 1.500 m (4.92 ft)
- Main armament: R-27: Single warhead, 1 MT yield R-27U: Single warhead, 1 MT yield or 3 x 0.2 MT Warheads
- Payload capacity: R-27: 650 kg (1,430 lb) Single Warhead; R-27U: 650 kg (1,430 lb) Single Warhead or 3x 0.2 MT Warheads 170 kg (370 lb) each
- Propellant: N_{2}O_{4}/UDMH
- Operational range: R-27: 2,400 km (1,500 mi); R-27U: 3,000 km (1,900 mi)
- Flight ceiling: R-27: 620 km (390 mi)
- Boost time: R-27: 128.5 Seconds
- Accuracy: R-27: CEP 1.9 km (1.2 mi); R-27U: CEP; 1.3–1.8 km (0.81–1.12 mi); R-27K: CEP 0.37 km (0.23 mi)
- Launch platform: Yankee-class submarine

The R-27 (Russian: Р-27) was a submarine-launched ballistic missile developed by the Soviet Union and employed by the Soviet Navy from 1968 through 1988. NATO assigned the missile the reporting name SS-N-6 Serb. In the USSR, it was given the GRAU index 4K10. It was a liquid fuel rocket using a hypergolic combination of unsymmetrical dimethylhydrazine (UDMH) as fuel, and nitrogen tetroxide (NTO) as oxidizer. Between 1974 and 1990, 161 missile launches were conducted, with an average success rate of 93%. Total production was 1,800 missiles.

The R-27 missiles were deployed on the Yankee I submarines, including the K-219.

== Technical details ==
The missile's body is an all-welded construction made of hard-worked AMg6 (АМг6) aluminium-magnesium-alloy panels, which underwent a two-step process of deep industrial etching and mechanical milling, reducing the plate thickness to one-fifth and one-ninth of the thickness of the original plate.

The outer surface of the missile was covered with a protective heat- and moisture-resistant Asbestos-based coating. In order to fit the R-27 into the corresponding launch tube, the missile was built without fins, but instead has several rows of rubber shock absorbers to keep the missile's skin from scratching along the side of the launch tube when fired.

The missile's tip featured a single, 650-kg detachable warhead with a yield of 1 MT. A high-explosive linear-shaped charge was used to separate the warhead from the missile.

Directly beneath the warhead, the instrumentation necessary for guidance of the missile was housed inside of a hemispherical compartment formed by the upper bulkhead of the oxidiser tank. This design decision allowed the easy removal of the guidance system from the missile for maintenance and removed the need for a service hatch.

To maximize the volume of propellant available inside the missile, the upper oxidiser tank and the lower fuel tank shared one common bulkhead instead of one bulkhead each as it was absolutely necessary to use every bit of volume available to be able to fit the missile into a submarine.

Another novelty was factory fueling with the subsequent "ampulization" of the tanks by welding filling and drain valves. In conjunction with efforts to improve the corrosion resistance of materials as well as the tightness of seams and joints, these fabrication methods allowed the missile to have a lifetime of 5 years, which was later extended to 15 years.

The missile was powered by an 4D10 rocket engine developed by OKB-2, consisting of a single fixed thrust chamber producing a thrust of 23 ton-force and two smaller gimbaled thrust chambers mounted on the frustum-shaped bottom of the fuel tank producing a total of 3 ton-force thrust. The engine was ignited using a squib and burned a hypergolic propellant combination, dinitrogen tetroxide and unsymmetrical dimethylhydrazine, which was delivered into the combustion chamber via turbopumps. The 4D10's main chamber operates on a highly-efficient oxidiser-rich staged combustion cycle to maximize fuel efficiency, while the two smaller chambers use the more ordinary gas-generator cycle. Both the larger chamber and the smaller chambers could be throttled by either regulating the single propellant line leading to the main chamber or a shared oxidiser line leading to the smaller chambers.

One of the most important novelties on this missile is that the main chamber of this rocket motor was integrated into the missile by permanently welding it inside the fuselage instead of mounting the rocket motor onto a thrust structure below the fuselage, which is the usual practice in rocket design. As a result of this design practice, most of the engine could not be tested, repaired or maintained as soon as it was permanently welded inside the missile.

When the R-27 was fired underwater, the container housing them was first overpressurized before the container was flooded and the pressure was equalized. To reduce the effect of water hammer when igniting the rocket engine, the nozzles were housed inside of a watertight air-filled adapter connecting the bottom of the missile with its container. The two smaller chambers are ignited first, before finally igniting the main chamber. The missiles were fired from a depth of 40 to 50 meters under the sea. Preparations for launch would take 10 minutes, and a salvo could be fired with an interval of 8 seconds between each launch.

=== R-27K ===
The 4K18 was a Soviet medium-range anti-ship ballistic missile (also known as R-27K, where "K" stands for Korabelnaya which means "ship-related") NATO SS-NX-13. The missile was a two-stage development of the single-stage R-27, the second stage containing the warhead as well as propulsion and terminal guidance. Initial submarine testing began on 9 December 1972 on board the K-102, a project 605 class submarine, a modified Project 629/ NATO Golf class lengthened 17.1m (formerly B-121), to accommodate four launch tubes as well as the Rekord-2 fire control system, the Kasatka B-605 Target acquisition system and various improvements to the navigation and communications systems. Initial trials ended on 18 December 1972 because the Rekord-2 fire control system hadn't been delivered yet. After a number of delays caused by several malfunctions, test firings were finally carried out between 11 September and 4 December 1973. Following the initial trials, the K-102 continued making trial launches with both the R-27 and the R-27K, until it was accepted for service on 15 August 1975.

Using external targeting data, the R-27K/SS-NX-13 would have been launched underwater to a range of between 350 and 400 nmi (650 and 740 km), covering a "footprint" of 27 nmi (50 km). The Maneuvering Re-Entry vehicle (MaRV) would then home in on the target with a CEP of 400 yards (370 m). Warhead yield was between 0.5-1 Mt.

The missile system never became operational, since every launch tube used for the R-27K counted as a strategic missile in the SALT agreement, and they were considered more important.

Although the R-27K could fit in the launch tubes of the Project 667A (NATO Yankee class), the subs lacked the necessary equipment to target and fire the missile.

=== Zyb (Suborbital Launch Vehicle) ===
In 1992, there was an ongoing effort to convert surplus Soviet Navy SLBMs which were taken out of service into launch vehicles. The Zyb sounding rocket was created on the basis of the R-27 specifically for performing experiments in a Microgravity environment. The rocket would be launched in a ballistic arc, exposing the payload to weightlessness for 17 to 24 minutes, depending on payload mass. The trajectory would reach its apogee at 1800 km or 1000 km for 650 kg and 1000 kg payload mass respectively. The rocket provided 1.5m^{3} of payload volume. The Zyb sounding rocket was launched a total of three times.

Launch Date	Payload	Description
1 December 1991	Sprint Module	Research on superconductivity.
9 December 1992	Efir Module	Biotechnological research regarding electrophoresis. The 650 kg re-entry capsule was recovered intact, but the experiment had failed to perform.
1 December 1993	Efir Module	Biotechnological research regarding electrophoresis. The 650 kg re-entry capsule was recovered intact, experiment successful.

=== Derived missiles ===
In 1992, the Makeyev Rocket Design Bureau signed a contract with North Korea regarding the creation of a R-27 derived launch vehicle. As a result of this, the very similar North Korean Hwasong-10 "Musudan" IRBM was derived from the R-27, the only major change from the original being a slightly extended fuselage. Prototypes of this missile were allegedly completed in 2000. It is suspected that a modified subvariant of this missile was then sold to the Iranian Military in 2005 under the designation BM-25 "Khorramshahr".

== Operators ==
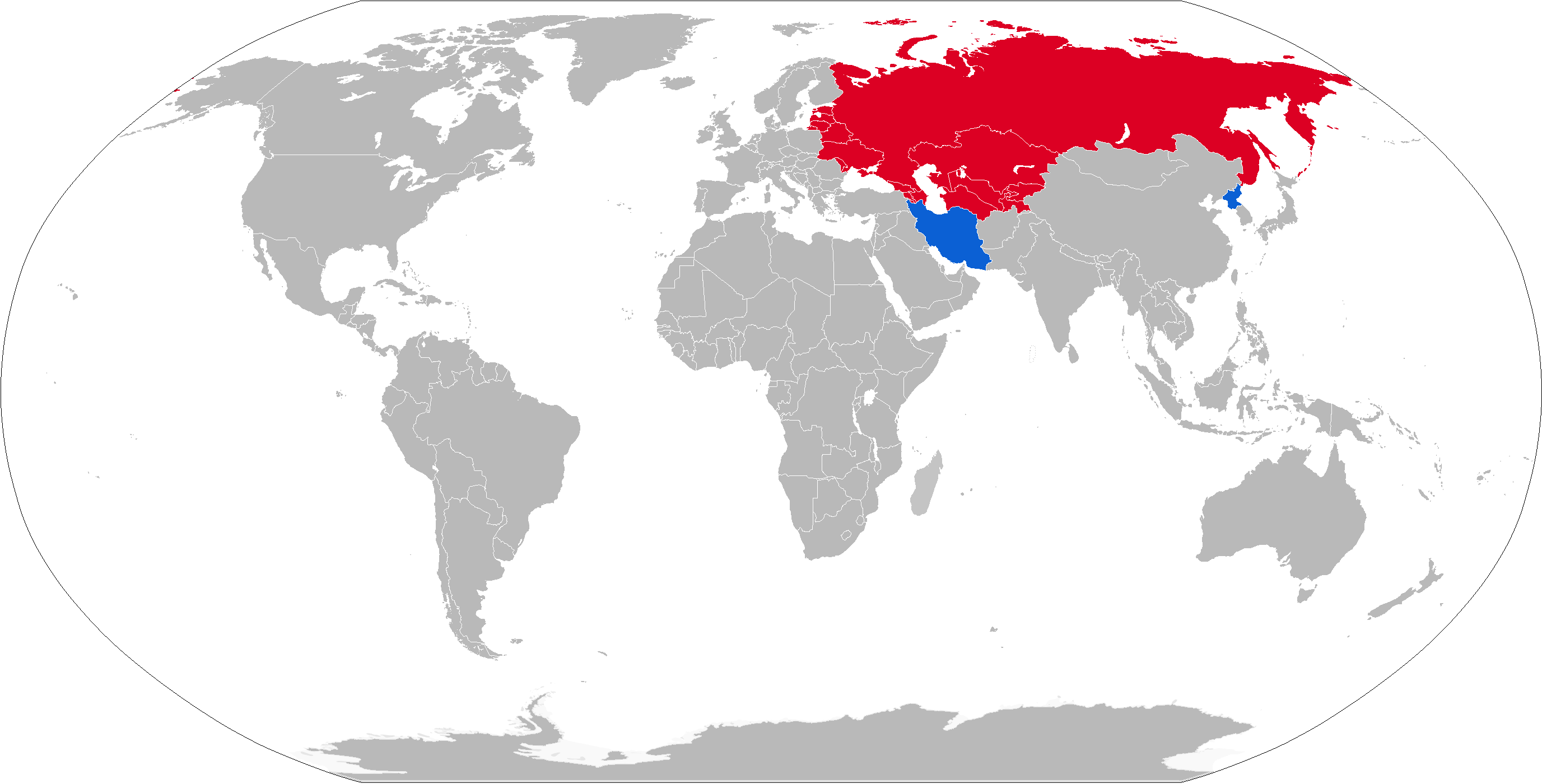
Map with R-27 Zyb operators in blue with former operators in red

Soviet Union: The Soviet Navy was the only operator of the R-27.
Iran : Operates the Khorramshahr, a heavily modified design based on the R-27.
North Korea : possibly operates the Hwasong-10, a modified variant of the R-27, some sources suggest North Korea might have abandoned development of the design due to its complexity.

== Variants ==
=== R-27 ===
- Total Mass: 14,200 kg
- Diameter: 1.50 m
- Total Length: 8.89 m
- Span: 1.50 m
- Payload: 650 kg
- Warhead: single nuclear: 1.0 Mt
- Maximum range: 2400 km
- CEP: 1.9 km
- Launch platform: project 667A submarines

=== R-27U (RSM-25) ===
- Total Mass: 14,200 kg
- Diameter: 1.50 m
- Total Length: 8.89 m
- Span: 1.50 m
- Payload: 650 kg
- Warhead: 3 : 200 kt
- Maximum range: 3,000 km
- CEP: 1.3 km
- Launch platform: project 667AU submarines

== See also ==
- Hwasong-10, based on the R-27
- Khorramshahr based on the Hwasong-10
