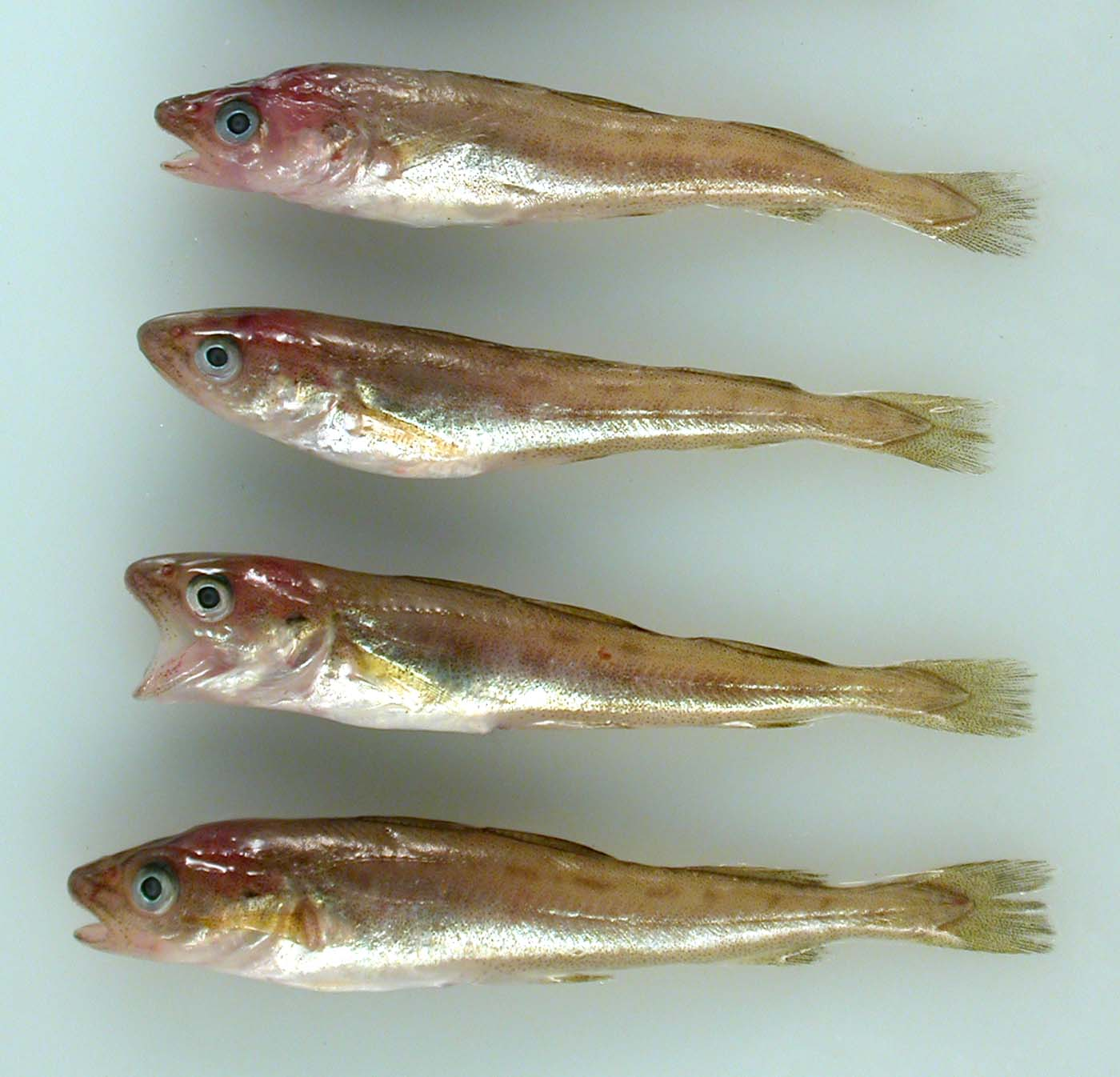
- Saffron cod juveniles

Scientific classification
- Kingdom: Animalia
- Phylum: Chordata
- Class: Actinopterygii
- Order: Gadiformes
- Family: Gadidae
- Genus: Eleginus
- Species: E. gracilis

Binomial name
- Eleginus gracilis (Tilesius, 1810)

Synonyms
- Gadus gracilis Tilesius, 1810; Gadus wachna Pallas, 1814

= Saffron cod =

Species of fish

The saffron cod (Eleginus gracilis) is a commercially harvested fish closely related to true cods (genus Gadus). It is dark grey-green to brown, with spots on its sides and pale towards the belly. It may grow to 55 cm and weigh up to 1.3 kg.

Its range spans the North Pacific, from the Yellow Sea and the Sea of Okhotsk in the west to the northern Gulf of Alaska and Sitka, Alaska, in the east. It also occurs in the Chukchi Sea (Arctic Ocean). It normally occurs in shallow coastal waters at less than 60 m depth but may also be found at depths up to 200 m. The saffron cod may also enter brackish and even fresh waters, occurring quite far up rivers and streams, but remaining within regions of tidal influence.

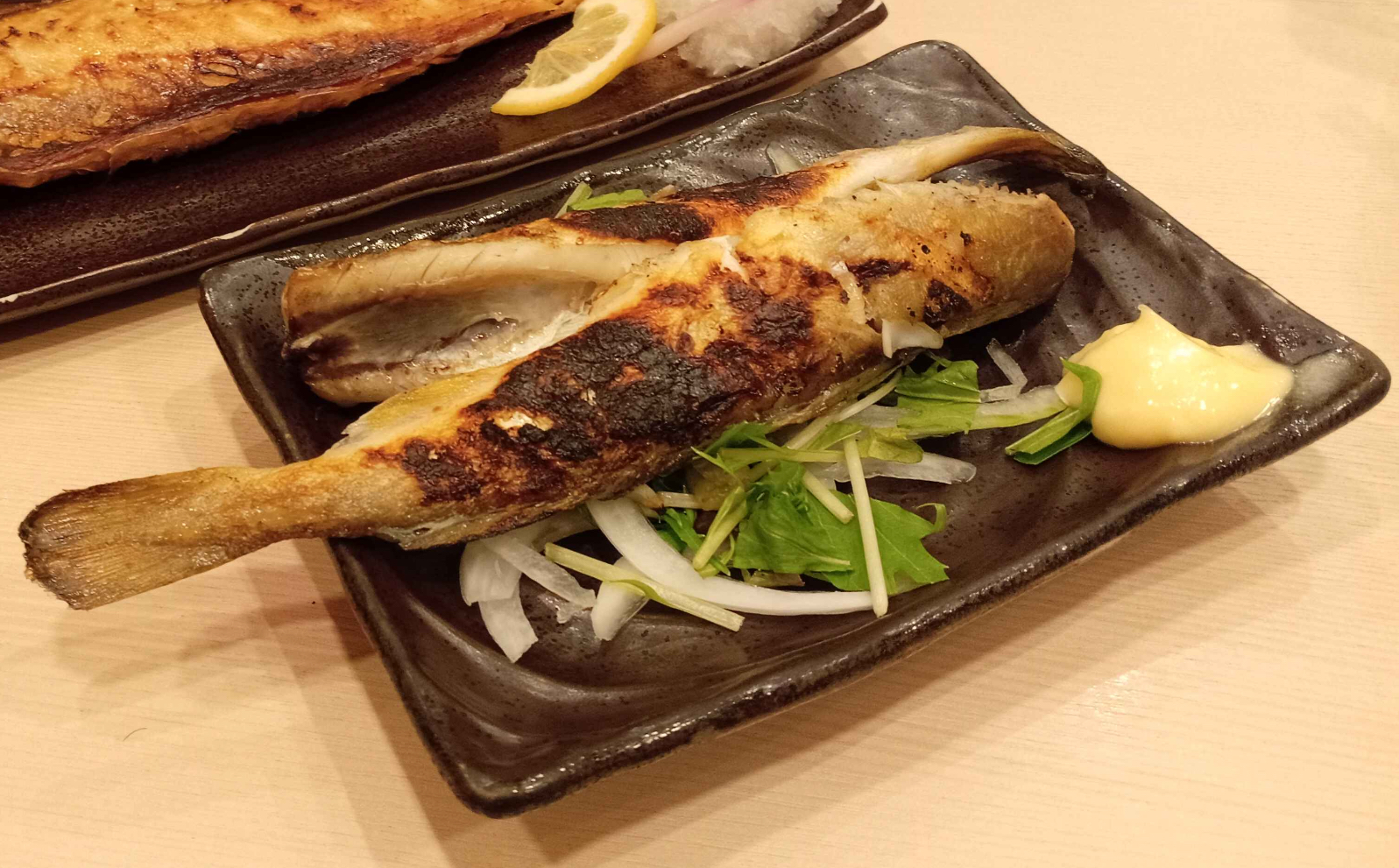
Grilled saffron cod as server in Tokyo

Saffron cods begin to mature during their third year of life. They feed on fish and small crustaceans. They are commercially fished in many areas of the northwestern Pacific. The country with the largest catch is Russia. It is used for human consumption in the Russian Federation and Japan, fresh or frozen.
