= R-31 (missile) =

- Type: Submarine-launched ballistic missile
- Place of origin: Soviet Union

Service history
- Used by: See Users

Production history
- Designer: Arsenal Design Bureau
- Manufacturer: Arsenal Design Bureau
- Variants: See Variants

Specifications
- Maximum firing range: 4,500 km

The R-31 (Russian: Р-31; NATO reporting name: SS-N-17 Snipe; bilateral arms control designation: RSM-45) was a Soviet submarine-launched ballistic missile.

Development for the missile began in June 1971 at the Arsenal Design Bureau. It was fitted on only one Yankee II class submarine, originally for evaluation purposes. A first test flight took place from the Yankee II Class submarine K-140 (photo) in December 1976. The RS-16 was the first solid-fueled ICBM in the Soviet Union's strategic arsenal. It was a two-stage delivery device armed with a single 500 kt nuclear warhead. A particular practical benefit of the design was the quiet submerged launch system, which used the missile's own buoyancy to lift it to the surface.

The missile entered service in March 1980, but was never installed in any other submarine other than the K-140, and was out of service by 1991. Apparently this missile was also capable of performing the duties of SLCMs, as the targeting distance could be varied drastically.

== Users ==
Soviet Union

- Soviet Navy

== Sources ==
- SS-N-17 at MissileThreat
- MILNET: Strategic Missiles
