= List of naval weapon systems =

The list of naval weapon systems aims to provide reference about weapons mounted on surface combatant warships, and smaller craft and submarines found throughout the history of naval warfare. The list is sorted alpha-numerically by system service designation (i.e. Mk 15), or issue name if designation is unknown: NB: As this is an English language list, NATO codenames are used preferentially. Glossary of abbreviations at bottom.

== 0-9 ==
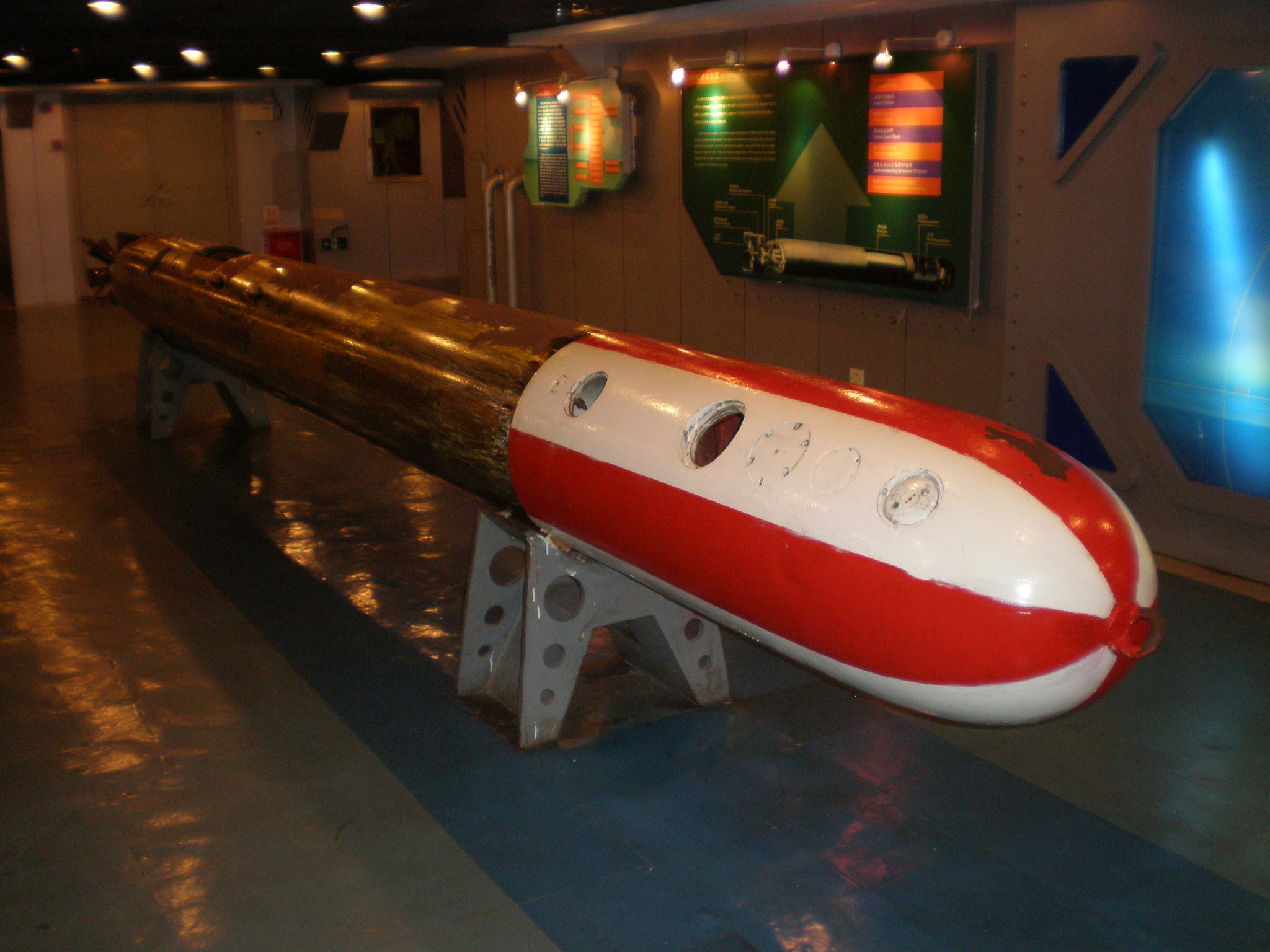
A Soviet 53-39 torpedo on display in Minsk World, Shenzhen, China

- 40/60 Gun
- 40/70 Gun
- 53-39 AntiShip Torpedo
- 53-51 AntiShip Torpedo
- 53-56 AntiShip Torpedo
- 53-57 AntiShip Torpedo
- 53-61 AntiShip Torpedo
- 53-65 AntiShip Torpedo
- 65-73 AntiShip Torpedo
- 65-76 AntiShip Torpedo

== A ==
- Advanced Light Torpedo Shyena
- AK-130 130 mm Gun
- AK-100 100 mm Gun
- AK–176 76.2 mm Gun
- AK-230 twin 30mm Gun
- AK-630 Gun
- Ak-725 57 mm Gun
- Albatros SAM
- AM-39 Exocet ASM
- APR-2 Airborne ASW Missile
- APR-3 Airborne ASW Missile
- Aspide SAM
- ASROC
- Aster SAM

== B ==
- Barak 1 point defense missile system
- Barak 8 area defense missile system
- Barak MX modular defense missile system
- Bar’er-vk
- BGM-109 Tomahawk Cruise Missile
- BL 13.5 inch Mk V naval gun
- BL 14 inch Mk VII naval gun
- BL 15 inch Mk I naval gun
- BL 16 inch Mk I naval gun
- BL 18 inch / 40 naval gun
- BL 6 inch Mk VII naval gun
- Bofors 40 mm gun
- BrahMos Supersonic cruise missile
- BrahMos-II Hypersonic cruise missile

== C ==
- Crotale SAM

== D ==
- Dealer torpedo
- Dhanush Shipborne anti-ship/land attack ballistic missile
- DRDO Naval Anti-Ship Missile Short Range (NASM-SR)
- DRDO Naval Anti-Ship Missile Extended Range (NASM-ER)
- DRDO Takshak torpedo

== E ==
- Exocet

== F ==
- F17 Torpedo

== G ==
- Gabriel SSM
- Goalkeeper CIWS
- Gökdeniz
- Guided Weapon System 1
- Guided Weapon System 2
- Guided Weapon System 21
- Guided Weapon System 22
- Guided Weapon System 23
- Guided Weapon System 24
- Guided Weapon System 25
- Guided Weapon System 26
- Guided Weapon System 30

== H ==
- Hedgehog
- HF-1 Hsiung Feng I SSM
- HF-2 Hsiung Feng II SSM
- HF-3 Hsiung Feng III SSM

== I ==
- Ikara SUM

== J ==
- JL-2 SLBM

== K ==
- K-15 nuclear-capable short range Submarine-launched ballistic missile (SLBM)
- K-4 nuclear-capable intermediate-range SLBM
- K-5 nuclear-capable intermediate-range SLBM
- K-6 nuclear-capable intercontinental-range SLBM
- K-ASROC (Hong Sang Eo (Red Shark) rocket-based torpedo)
- K731 HW White Shark torpedo
- K745 LW Blue Shark torpedo

== L ==
- Limbo

== M ==
- M-4 SLBM
- M45 SLBM
- M51 SLBM
- Manta Mine
- Mattress
- MM-38 Exocet SSM
- MM-40 Exocet SSM
- Modele 53 100mm Gun
- Modele 64 100mm Gun
- Modele 68 CADAM 100mm Gun
- Modele 100 TR 100mm Gun
- MU90 Impact Torpedo
- Mk 1 Terrier Missile launcher USS Mississippi
- Mk 4 Triple 14"/50 Gun
- Mk 4 Terrier Missile launcher
- Mk 5 Twin 16"/45 Gun
- Mk 5 Terrier Missile launcher
- Mk 6 Triple 16"/45 Gun
- Mk 7 Triple 16"/50 Gun
- Mk 7 Talos Missile launcher
- Mk 8 Triple 12"/50 Gun
- Mk 9 Terrier Missile launcher
- Mk 8 Torpedo
- Mk 10 Terrier Missile launcher
- Mk 11 Tartar Missile launcher
- Mk 12 Talos Missile launcher
- Mk 13 Missile Launcher
- Mk 14 torpedo
- Mk 15 torpedo
- Mk 15 Phalanx CIWS
- Mk 16 5 inch DP (Dual Purpose) Gun
- Mk 16 ASROC Launcher
- Mk 19 Grenade launcher
- Mk 22 3 inch Gun
- Mk 22 Missile Launcher
- Mk 24 Tigerfish Torpedo
- Mk 25 Sea Sparrow launcher
- Mk 26 3"/70 DP (Dual Purpose) Gun
- Mk 26 Missile Launcher
- Mk 27 target torpedo
- Mk 29 NATO Sea Sparrow launcher
- Mk 30 target torpedo
- Mk 32 SVTT (Surface Vessel Torpedo Tubes)
- Mk 33 3"/50 DP (Dual Purpose) Gun
- Mk 36 SRBOC (Super Rapid Blooming Offboard Countermeasure)
- Mk 37 Torpedo
- Mk 38 Chain Gun
- Mk 38 Mod 1 Machine Gun
- Mk 38 Mod 2 Stabilized Machine Gun
- Mk 41 VLS (Vertical Launch System)
- Mk 42 5 inch DP (Dual Purpose) Gun
- Mk 44 Torpedo
- Mk 45 5 inch DP (Dual Purpose) Gun
- Mk 46 Torpedo
- Mk 48 Torpedo
- Mk 50 Torpedo
- Mark 54 Torpedo
- Mark 56 GFCS
- Mark 63 GFCS
- Mk 74 FCS
- Mk 75 Oto Melara 76mm Compact Gun
- Mk 68 GFCS
- Mk 72 Mod 0 sonar system
- Mk 84 sonar system
- Mk 86 Gun FCS (Fire Control System)
- Mk 91 FCS
- MK 92 FCS
- Mk 114 ASW FCS
- Mk 116 ASW FCS
- Mk 112 ASROC Launcher
- Mk 141 Quad Harpoon Launcher
- Mk 143 Quad Tomahawk Box Launcher

== N ==
- Nirbhay long range subsonic anti-ship/land attack cruise missile
- Nulka Active Missile Decoy
- Naval Strike Missile

== O ==
- Otomat SSM

== P ==
- PAAMS NCS
- Penguin SSM
- Phalanx CIWS
- Polaris missile

== Q ==
- QF 1 pounder pom-pom
- QF 12 pounder 12 cwt naval gun
- QF 12 pounder 18 cwt naval gun
- QF 14 pounder Maxim-Nordenfelt naval gun
- QF 2 pounder naval gun
- QF 3 pounder Hotchkiss
- QF 3 pounder Vickers
- QF 3 inch Mark N1 gun
- QF 4 inch Mk V gun
- QF 4.5 inch naval gun
- QF 4.7 inch Gun Mk I - IV
- QF 5.25 inch Mark I naval gun
- QF 6 inch Mk I - III naval gun
- QF 6 pounder Hotchkiss
- QF 6 inch Mark N5 gun

== R ==
- RAT-52 antiship torpedo
- RGM-6 Regulus SSM
- RGM-15 Regulus II SSM
- RGM-59 Taurus SSM
- RGM-165 LASM SSM
- RGM-84 Harpoon SSM
- RIM-2 Terrier SAM
- RIM-7 Sea Sparrow PDMS
- RIM-8 Talos
- RIM-24 Tartar SAM
- RIM-50 Typhon LR SAM
- RIM-55 Typhon MR SAM
- RIM-66 SM-1MR Standard Medium Range SAM
- RIM-66 SM-2MR Standard Medium Range SAM
- RIM-67 SM-1ER Standard Extended Range SAM
- RIM-67 SM-2ER Standard Extended Range SAM
- RIM-116 Rolling Airframe Missile SAM
- RIM-156 SM-2ER Block IV SAM
- RIM-161 SM-3 SAM
- RIM-162 ESSM (Evolved Sea Sparrow Missile) SAM
- RPK-8 Antisubmarine Rocket System
- RUR-4
- RUM-139 VL ASROC
- RUR-5 ASROC

== S ==
- SA-N-1 Goa SAM
- SA-N-2 Guideline SAM
- SA-N-3 Goblet SAM
- SA-N-4 Gecko SAM
- SA-N-5 Grail SAM
- SA-N-6 Grumble SAM
- SA-N-7 Gadfly SAM
- SA-N-8 Gremlin SAM
- SA-N-9 Gauntlet SAM
- SA-N-10 Grouse SAM
- SA-N-11 Grisom SAM
- SA-N-12 Grizzly SAM
- Sea Cat SAM
- Sea Dart missile SAM
- SAET-50 Anti-Ship Torpedo
- SAET-60 Anti-Ship Torpedo
- Sea Gnat Decoy
- Sea Slug SAM
- Sea Wolf SAM
- SET-40 antisubmarine torpedo
- SET-53 antisubmarine torpedo
- SET-65 antisubmarine torpedo
- SET-72 antisubmarine torpedo
- Squid
- SMART system (Supersonic Missile Assisted Release of Torpedo (SMART) system)
- SM-4 SAM
- SM-39 Exocet USM
- Spearfish Torpedo
- SS-N-1 Scrubber SSM
- SS-N-2 Styx SSM
- SS-N-3 Sepal/Shaddock SSM
- SS-N-4 Sark SLBM
- SS-N-5 Serb SLBM
- SS-N-6 Serb SLBM
- SS-N-7 Starbright SSM
- SS-N-8 Sawfly SLBM
- SS-N-9 Siren SSM
- SS-N-12 Sandbox SSM
- SS-N-14 Silex SUM
- SS-N-15 Starfish SSM
- SS-N-16 Stallion SSM
- SS-N-17 Snipe SLBM
- SS-N-18 Stingray SLBM
- SS-N-19 Shipwreck SSM
- SS-N-20 Sturgeon SLBM
- SS-N-21 Sampson SSM
- SS-N-22 Sunburn SSM
- SS-N-23 Skiff SLBM
- SS-N-24 Scorpion SSM
- SS-N-25 Switchblade SSM
- Sting Ray torpedo
- SUBROC

== T ==
- TEST71 Torpedo
- TP 61 Torpedo
- TP 613 Torpedo
- TP 617 Torpedo
- TP 62 Torpedo
- TP 2000 Torpedo
- Trident missile
- Type 53 torpedo
- Type 65 torpedo
- Type 91 torpedo
- Type 92 torpedo
- Type 93 torpedo
- Type 95 torpedo
- Type 97 torpedo

== U ==
- UGM-27 Polaris SLBM
- UGM-73 Poseidon SLBM
- UGM-84 Sub-Harpoon USM
- UGM-93 Trident SLBM
- UGM-133 Trident II SLBM
- UMGT-1 Torpedo antisubmarine torpedo
- USET-80 Torpedo
- UUM-44 SUBROC UUM

== V ==
- VA-111 Shkval Torpedo
- Varunastra (torpedo) heavy weight torpedo
- VL-SRSAM short/medium range quick reaction surface-to-air missile based on Astra (missile)
- VL MICA naval version of MICA (missile)

== W ==
- Weapon Alpha

== Glossary ==
- ASM - Anti-Ship Missile
- CIWS - Close In Weapon System
- FCS - Fire Control System
- GFCS - Gun FCS
- NCS - Naval Combat System
- PDMS - Point Defence Missile System
- SAM - Surface to Air Missile
- SA-N - Surface to Air Missile (Naval)
- SLBM - Submarine Launched Ballistic Missile
- SSM - Surface to Surface Missile
- SUM - Surface to Underwater Missile
- USM - Undersurface to Surface Missile
- UUM - Undersurface to Undersurface Missile

== See also ==
- List of naval guns
