= List of United States Navy Guided Missile Launching Systems =

The Guided Missile Launching System (GMLS) is a device for launching guided missiles, and is found on many U.S. Navy ships. This list includes all launchers that are part of the designation series. Included on this list are missile launchers that have not been adopted for service in the United States Navy, as well as decoy launch systems.

== Launchers by designation ==
Picture	Designation	Description
	Mk 1	Twin Arm Terrier Launcher on USS Mississippi for initial Terrier testing.
	Mk 4	Early twin-arm launcher for the RIM-2 Terrier. Fit only to the Boston-class guided missile cruisers. Vertically loading design distinguished this launcher from the horizontally loading Mk 9 and Mk 10.
	Mk 5	Asymmetrical twin-arm launcher for experimental launches of the Terrier, Tartar and Standard missiles. Terrier Extended Range missiles were fired from its right arm rail, while Tartar Medium Range missiles were launched from its left arm. Used at USS Desert Ship Navy surface-to-air weapons testing facility at White Sands Missile Range.
	Mk 7	Twin-arm launcher for the RIM-8 Talos missile, with a magazine of 46. Used on Galveston-class cruisers. Differed from Mk 12 in that all missiles were stored above main deck.
	Mk 8	Experimental twin-arm launcher for the RIM-2 Terrier missile. Used on USS Gyatt, the first USN guided-missile destroyer. Two cylindrical magazines with 7 missiles each, fitted into a reworked deckhouse.
	Mk 9	Twin-arm launcher for the RIM-2 Terrier missile. Used on Providence-class cruisers. Differed from Mk 10 in that all missiles were stored above main deck, in a pair of 60-round magazines.
	Mk 10	Twin-arm launcher for the RIM-2 Terrier or RIM-67 Standard missile. Employed below main deck magazines, in the form of two to four 20-round cylinders. Used on Belknap-class cruisers and other Terrier ships. Some launchers were modified to store and launch the RUR-5 ASROC.
	Mk 11	Twin-arm launcher for RIM-24 Tartar or RIM-66 Standard missile. Used on Albany-class cruisers and the first thirteen Charles F. Adams-class destroyers. The New Threat Upgrade added the ability to launch RGM-84 Harpoon anti-ship missiles. Used vertical below-deck storage rings similar to the later Mk 13 for a total of 42 missiles.
	Mk 12	Twin-arm launcher for the RIM-8 Talos missile. Employed below main deck magazines, with a capacity of 52. Deployed on Albany-class cruisers and USS Long Beach.
	Mk 13	Single-arm rail launch system. Initial mods fired RIM-24 Tartar missiles, while later mods supported RIM-66 Standard and RGM-84 Harpoon, all stored vertically in concentric rotating storage rings with a total of 40 missiles. Used on Oliver Hazard Perry-class frigates, California-class cruisers and other Tartar ships.
Similar to Mk 13 launcher	Mk 14	A single-arm rail launcher for the RIM-55 Typhon MR missile. Based on the Mark 13, but with the missile being held above the rail. Canceled before definite blueprints were created.
	Mk 15	A ground-based test launcher for the UGM-27 Polaris ballistic missile.
	Mk 16	The 8-round ASROC "Matchbox" launcher for the RUR-5 ASROC. Used on many USN and other vessels. Some vessels such as the last three Brooke-class frigates, all Knox-class frigates, California-class cruisers and the Spruance-class destroyers had reloading systems with up to 16 reloads. The launcher itself is also known as the Mark 112.
	Mk 17	Vertical launcher for the UGM-27 Polaris ballistic missile on USN George Washington class, Ethan Allen class and Lafayette class submarines. Variants with 8 and 16 tubes.
	Mk 21	Enhanced version of the Mark 17 for UGM-27C Polaris A-3 missiles, also with 16 tubes. Used on all 41 for Freedom submarines.
Similar to Mk 13 launcher	Mk 22	A single-arm rail-launch system similar to the Mk 13, but with a smaller (16-round) nonrotating magazine. It supports RIM-24 Tartar, RIM-66 Standard MR and RGM-84 Harpoon missiles. Formerly used on US Brooke-class frigates, and deployed to this day on the US-designed Spanish Navy Baleares-class frigates.
	Mk 24	16-tube vertical launcher for the UGM-73 Poseidon ballistic missile on USN Lafayette class, James Madison class and Benjamin Franklin class submarines.
	Mk 25	The box launcher for Basic Point Defense Missile system (BPDMS) carrying eight RIM-7 Sea Sparrow with mid-fins not folded. Used on Knox-class frigates and others. Replaced by Mk 29 IBPDMS.
	Mk 26	A twin-arm rail-launch system which supports RIM-66 Standard, RUR-5 ASROC, and other missile types. It was one of the last rail-based missile launchers used by the US Navy, used on early Ticonderoga-class cruisers, Virginia-class cruisers and Kidd-class destroyers. Used below-deck magazines with 24 to 64 vertically stored missiles.
	Mk 28	Tube launcher for chaff-equipped Zuni rockets, used on various ships. It consisted of two tubes on top of each other, with each tube carrying four rockets.
	Mk 29	The 8-cell launcher, featured on Nimitz-class aircraft carriers and other NATO Sea Sparrow Missile (NSSM)-carrying ships. It fires RIM-7 Sea Sparrow missiles, with mid-fins folded making it smaller than the Mk 25 launchers. Launchers are being retrofitted to launch the RIM-162D Evolved Sea Sparrow.
	Mk 32	Box launcher for the SM-1MR Standard missile, in twin and triple variants. Used only by Taiwan, first fitted to Yang class frigates, and later moved to Chi Yang-class frigates.
	Mk 33	Four-tube launcher for 112mm chaff cartridges (with each tube holding six cartridges), used on Garcia class and Bronstein class frigates.
	Mk 34	Twin-barrel chaff launching system for the Pegasus-class hydrofoils, used the same 112mm cartridges as the Mark 33.
	Mk 35	16-tube vertical launcher for the UGM-96 Trident I ballistic missile on USN James Madison class, Benjamin Franklin class and Ohio class submarines.
	Mk 36	Six-tube launcher for chaff and IR decoys, used on numerous ships. Each tube holds 3-6 rounds, depending on variant. Also known as SRBOC or Super Rapid Bloom Offboard Countermeasures Chaff and Decoy Launching System.
	Mk 41	Vertical launch system consisting of 8-cell modules. These launchers are highly versatile, come in three size variants, and can launch a wide range of USN ordnance. Currently missiles that are operational from this launcher type are the B/RGM-109, RIM-66M Standard, RIM-156A Standard, RIM-161 Standard 3, RUM-139 VL ASROC, RIM-7 VL Sea Sparrow, RIM-162A/B Evolved Sea Sparrow, and the RIM-174A Standard ERAM.
	Mk 44	A system using the "Armored Box Launcher" for four BGM-109A/B/C Tomahawk cruise missiles. The launcher itself is also known as the Mark 143.
	Mk 45	Vertical launcher for 12 UGM-109 Tomahawk cruise missiles on Virginia class and Los Angeles class submarines.
	Mk 48	The Mk 48 GMLS is a vertical launch system for six RIM-7 VL Sea Sparrow or RIM-162C Evolved Sea Sparrow missiles. This launcher is used primarily by the Royal Canadian Navy and Japanese Maritime Self Defense Force, but has not been adopted by the USN.
	Mk 49	The 21-round trainable launcher for the RIM-116 Rolling Airframe Missile.
	Mk 53	Nulka anti-missile decoy launcher, with two- and four-tube variants.
Similar to Mk 48 launcher	Mk 56	The Mk 56 GMLS is a vertical launch system for 6-12 RIM-162C Evolved Sea Sparrow missiles. This launcher is primarily used by the Royal Danish Navy and has not been adopted by the USN
	Mk 57	Peripheral Vertical Launching System, developed for the DDG-1000 destroyer. It has 4 cells per launcher, which are compatible with every missile currently integrated into the MK 41 VLS, but enlarged for future upgrades.
	Mk 70	Mk 41 derivative, 40 foot ISO-container with 4 strike length VLS cells, developed for the Navy (LCS) and Army (Typhon missile launcher). Compatible with every missile currently integrated into the MK 41 VLS, plus Patriot PAC-3. Full name is Mk 70 Mod 1 Payload Delivery System (PDS)
	Mk 87	A box launcher for four RGM-184 NSM.
	Mk 141	A tube launcher for four RGM-84 Harpoon missiles.
