= Taurus missile =

Taurus missile may refer to:

- Taurus KEPD 350, a German/Swedish air-launched cruise missile
- RGM-59 Taurus, an unbuilt American surface-to-surface missile
