= USS Desert Ship (LLS-1) =

American Navy facility in New Mexico

Coordinates: 32.4040°N 106.3454°W

- Part of Naval Surface Warfare Center
- White Sands Missile Range, New Mexico
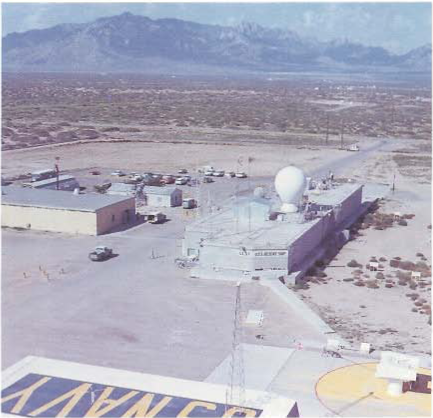

Site information
- Type: Aboveground facility
- Open to the public: No

Site history
- Built: 1957–1958
- Built by: U.S. Navy
- In use: 1958–present

Garrison information
- Garrison: White Sands Missile Range, New Mexico
- Occupants: Naval Surface Warfare Center

USS Desert Ship (LLS-1) is a concrete blockhouse providing assembly and launch facilities simulating shipboard conditions for Navy surface-to-air weapons testing at the Naval Surface Warfare Center Port Hueneme (NSWC PHD) White Sands Detachment – White Sands.

== Origin ==
The beginning of construction of the Desert Ship coincided with the start of testing of the RIM-8 Talos missile. Although there was a mock christening upon completion of the building, the Desert Ship has never been commissioned and special permission from Congress was required to name the building "USS Desert Ship". The designation "LLS" stands for "Land Locked Ship".

== History ==
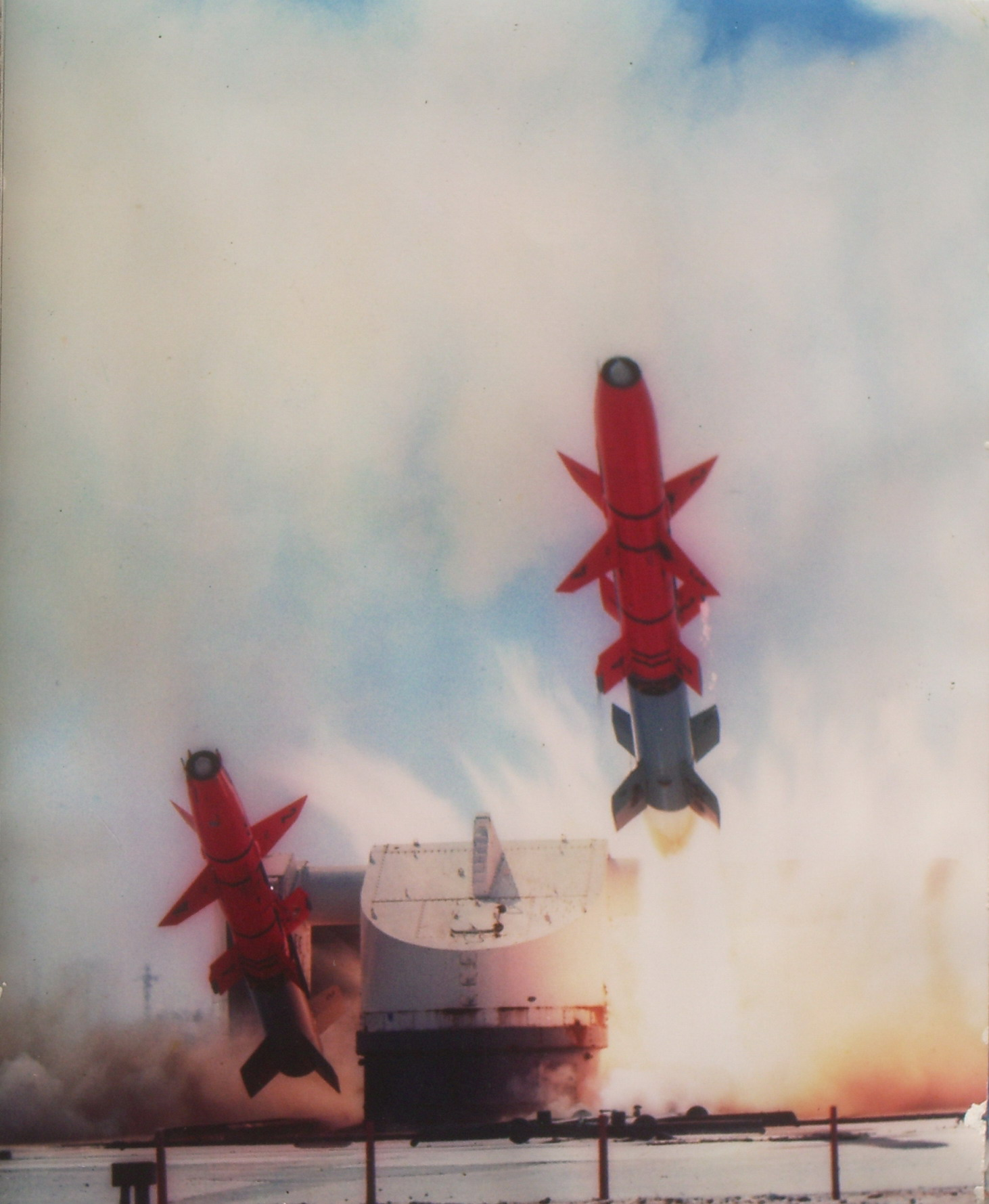
Talos missile launch at White Sands.

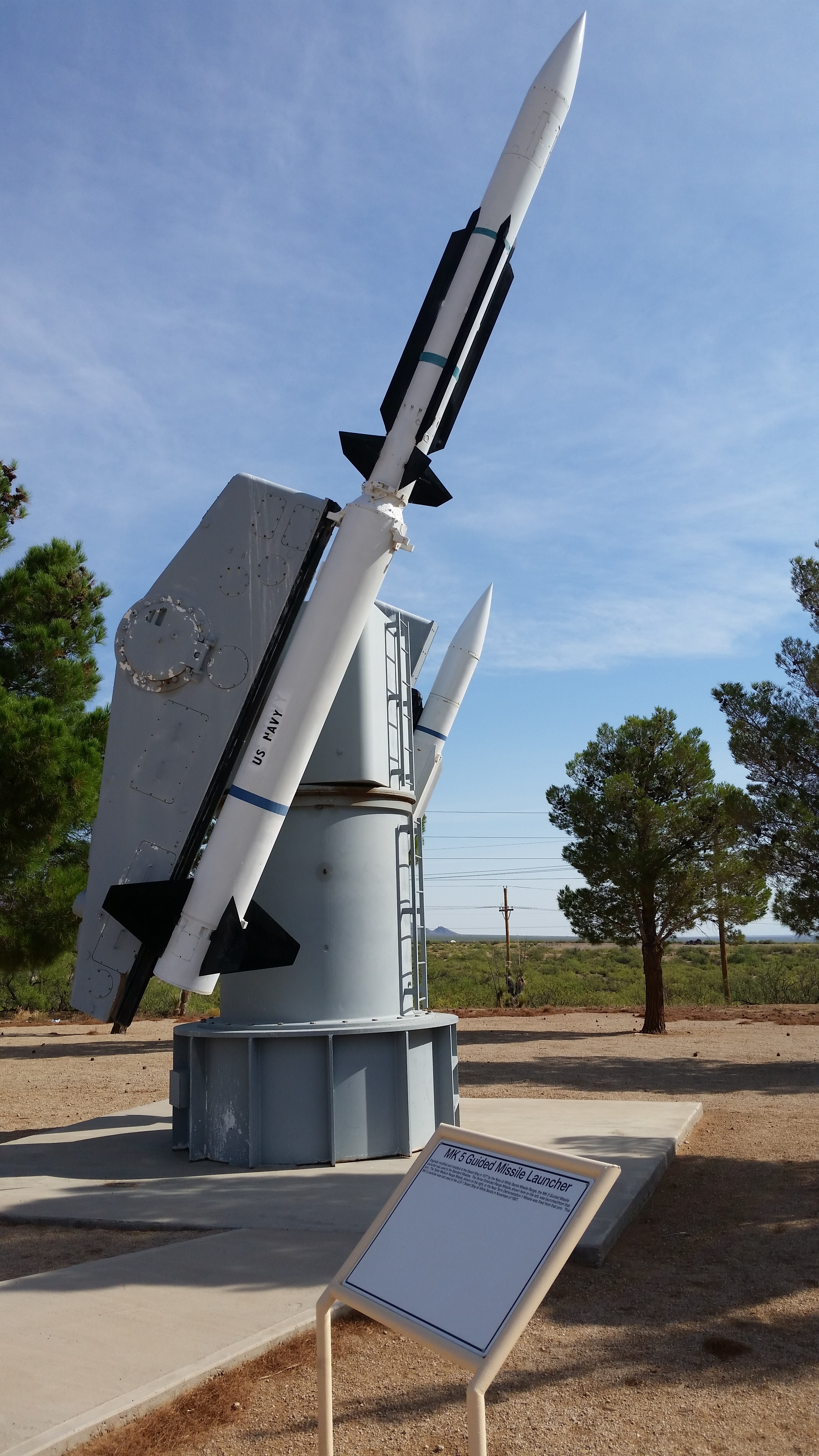
White Sands Missile Range Museum MK5 display

Desert Ship was originally used to test the Talos missile. Subsequent uses have included testing the Standard Missile, Aegis Weapons System, and, in mid-2008, the Standard Missile 6.

The Desert Ship is one of two "Land-Locked Ships" operated by the U.S. Navy, the other being the USS Rancocas in New Jersey.

== Chronology ==
- 13 April 1941 – Alamogordo Army Airfield established.
- December 1941 – Public land grazing leases were canceled on the newly formed Alamogordo Bombing and Gunnery Range.
- 20 February 1945 – White Sands Proving Ground (WSPG) established as a missile test range.
- 26 September 1945 – A modified Navy Tiny Tim (rocket) configured as a booster for WAC Corporal became the first missile launched by the Army at WSPG.
- October 1945 – United States Army Air Corps Chief of Ordnance (OCO) invited the Navy to participate in the WSPG guided missile program.
- January 1946 – OCO offered Naval Research Laboratory (NRL) use of captured V-2 rockets for research; and NRL established the Rocket and Satellite Research Panel chaired by Johns Hopkins University Applied Physics Laboratory (APL) Dr. James Van Allen.
- 17 May 1946 – WSPG Naval Ordnance Missile Test Facility established.
- July 1946 – Navy Bureau of Ordnance began construction of the WSPG Navy Cantonment Area.
- May 1947 – Navy began construction of the Launch Complex 35 (LC-35) blockhouse with two tiltable, 140-foot Aerobee launch towers.
- 24 November 1947 – Navy launched the first fully configured Aerobee sounding rocket, which carried cosmic-ray instruments to an altitude of 36.7 miles.
- 3 May 1949 – First launch of the Navy's Viking (rocket) reached an altitude of 50 miles.
- Late 1949 – After a V–2 was launched at sea from the deck of USS Midway, the Navy intentionally toppled and exploded a fully fueled V–2 on a segment of carrier flight deck (Operation Pushover) at WSPG.
- 21 November 1950 – Viking 5 set a single-stage altitude record of 107 miles.
- August 1951 – Viking set a single-stage altitude and speed record of 135 miles at 4,100 miles per hour.
- 1951 – Talos program testing moves to WSPG from Naval Air Weapons Station China Lake.
- August 1952 – First Talos missile launch at WSPG.
- May 1953 – Base name formally changed from White Sands Proving Ground to White Sands Missile Range (WSMR).
- June 1953 – Construction completed for USS Desert Ship blockhouse.
- May 1954 – Viking 11 set a single-stage altitude record of 158 miles.
- April 1957 – Aerobee-Hi set a single stage altitude record of 190 miles.
- 1957 – Completion of the Desert Ship deckhouse addition enabled missile assembly to be moved from headquarters to Desert Ship.
- September 1957 – The first land-based Talos Defense Unit (TDU) was completed just west of Desert Ship.
- December 1957 – The first launch of a TDU-directed Talos scored a direct hit on the target drone.
- March 1961 – First launch of the Typhon Combat System
- 1966 – Testing of RIM-2 Terrier and RIM-24 Tartar missiles was shifted to WSMR from China Lake.
- 1983 – Aegis fleet fire-control system completed development at WSMR and entered fleet service.
