= Standard Missile =

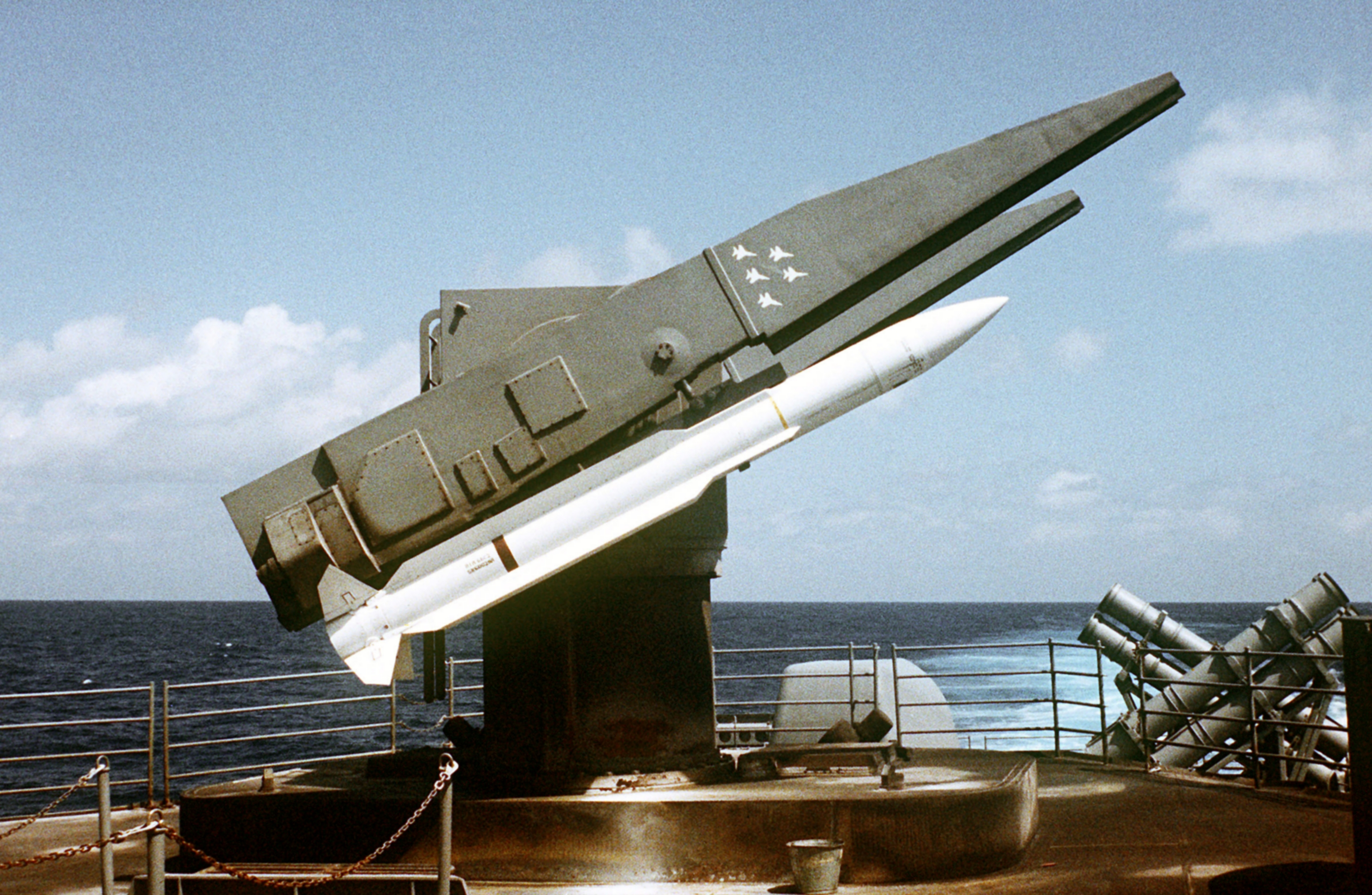
RIM-66 Standard MR/SM-2 missiles on a Mark 26 launcher, prior to being fired from the Aegis guided missile cruiser USS TICONDEROGA (CG-47) during tests near the Atlantic Fleet Weapons Training Facility, Roosevelt Roads, Puerto Rico.

Standard Missile refers to a family of American-made shipborne guided missiles:

- RIM-66 Standard (SM-1MR/SM-2MR), a medium-range surface-to-air missile, designed as the successor of the RIM-24 Tartar surface-to-air missile. The RIM-66 is currently in use by the U.S. Navy and many other navies around the world.
- RIM-67 Standard (SM-1ER/SM-2ER), an extended-range surface-to-air missile, designed to be the successor of the RIM-2 Terrier surface-to-air missile, but ultimately withdrawn from service because it was too long to fit into vertical launching system equipped ships. It was replaced with the RIM-156A.
- AGM-78 Standard ARM, a long-range air-launched anti-radiation missile used by the U.S. Navy and the U.S. Air Force during the War in Vietnam.
- XAIM-97A Seekbat, a proposed long range air-to-air missile, based on the AGM-78, development was cancelled at the flight testing stage.
- RIM-156A Standard, an extended-range surface-to-air missile, a VLS version of the RIM-67 Standard.
- RIM-161 Standard Missile 3 (SM-3), a ship-launched anti-ballistic missile, originally based on the SM-2ER Block IV (RIM-156).
- RGM-165 LASM (SM-4), a proposed ship-launched land-attack missile, based on the SM-2MR Block III (RIM-66K).
- RIM-174 Standard ERAM (SM-6), an upgraded version of the SM-2. It is designed to intercept both hostile aircraft and high-performance anti-ship missiles.
- AIM-174B (SM-6), a long-range air-launched version of SM-6. Equipping Boeing F/A-18E/F Super Hornets.
