= RIM-66 Standard =

US medium range surface-to-air missile

RIM-66 Standard MR
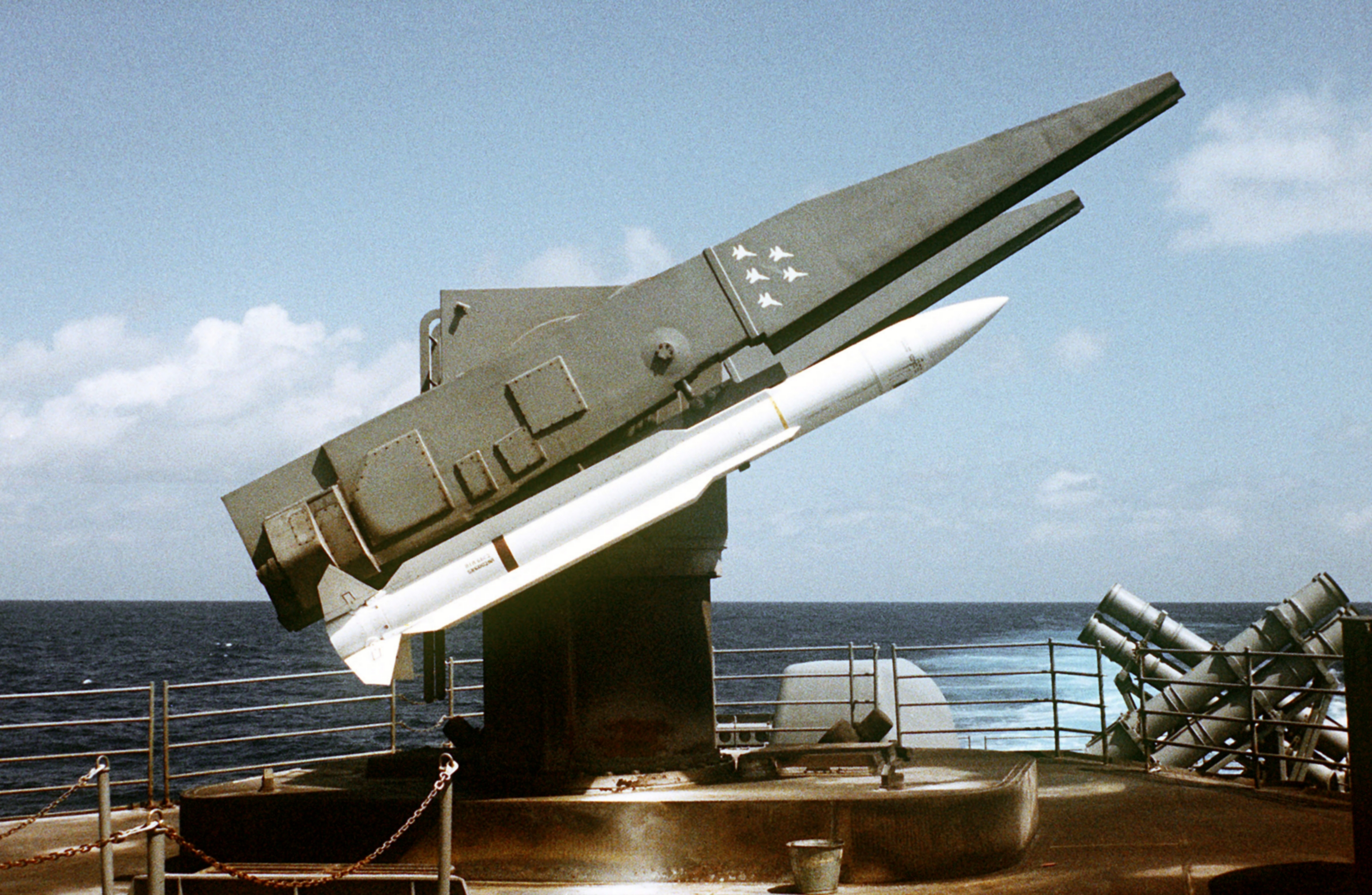
- A RIM-66 Standard MR on a Mk-26 launcher
- Type: Medium-range surface-to-air missile with anti-ship capability
- Place of origin: United States

Service history
- In service: 1967 (RIM-66A SM-1MR Block I); 1979 (RIM-66C SM-2MR)
- Used by: See list of Operators

Production history
- Produced: 1967 onwards
- No. built: Over 5,000

Specifications
- Mass: SM-2 – 1,558 lb (707 kg)
- Length: 15 ft 6 in (4.72 m)
- Diameter: 13.5 in (34.3 cm)
- Wingspan: 3 ft 6 in (1.07 m)
- Warhead: Blast fragmentation warhead
- Detonation mechanism: Radar and contact fuze
- Engine: Dual thrust, solid-fuel rocket
- Operational range: 40 to 92 nmi (74 to 170 km)
- Flight ceiling: > 25,000 m (82,000 ft)
- Maximum speed: Mach 3.5 (4,290 km/h; 2,660 mph; 1.19 km/s)
- Guidance system: SM-2MR Block IIIA Command and Inertial midcourse guidance with monopulse semi-active radar homing in the terminal phase of the interception. SM-2MR Block IIIB missiles have dual infrared homing/semi-active terminal homing. SM-1MR Block VI missiles have monopulse semi-active radar homing without command and inertial mid-course guidance.
- Launch platform: Surface ship

The RIM-66 Standard MR (SM-1MR/SM-2MR) is a medium-range surface-to-air missile (SAM), with a secondary role as an anti-ship missile, developed for the United States Navy (USN). A member of the Standard Missile family of weapons, the SM-1 was developed as a replacement for the RIM-2 Terrier and RIM-24 Tartar medium-range missiles that were deployed in the 1950s on a variety of USN ships. The RIM-67 Standard (SM-1ER/SM-2ER) is an extended range version of this missile with a solid rocket booster stage.

== Description ==
The Standard missile program was started in 1963 to produce a family of missiles to replace existing guided missiles used by the Terrier, Talos, and Tartar guided missile systems. The intention was to produce a new generation of guided missiles that could be retrofitted to existing guided missile systems.

=== Standard Missile 1 ===
The RIM-66A is the medium range version of the Standard missile and was initially developed as a replacement for the earlier RIM-24C as part of the Mk74 "Tartar" Guided Missile Fire Control System. It used the same fuselage as the earlier Tartar missile, for easier use with existing launchers and magazines for that system. The RIM-66A/B while looking like the earlier RIM-24C on the exterior is a different missile internally with redesigned electronics and a more reliable homing system and fuze that make it more capable than its predecessor. The RIM-66A/B Standard MR, (SM-1MR Block I to V) was used during the Vietnam War. The only remaining version of the Standard missile 1 in service is the RIM-66E (SM-1MR Block VI). While no longer in service with the USN, the RIM-66E is still in service with many navies globally and was expected to remain in service until 2020.

=== Standard Missile 2 ===
The RIM-66C/D Standard MR (SM-2MR Block I) was developed in the 1970s and was a key part of the Aegis combat system and New Threat Upgrade (NTU). The SM-2MR introduced inertial and command mid-course guidance. The missile's autopilot is programmed to fly the most efficient path to the target and can receive course corrections from the ground. Target illumination for semi-active homing is needed only for a few seconds in the terminal phase of the interception. This capability enables the Aegis combat system and New Threat Upgrade equipped vessels to time-share illumination radars, greatly increasing the number of targets that can be engaged in quick succession.

The SM-1 and SM-2 were continuously upgraded through Blocks.

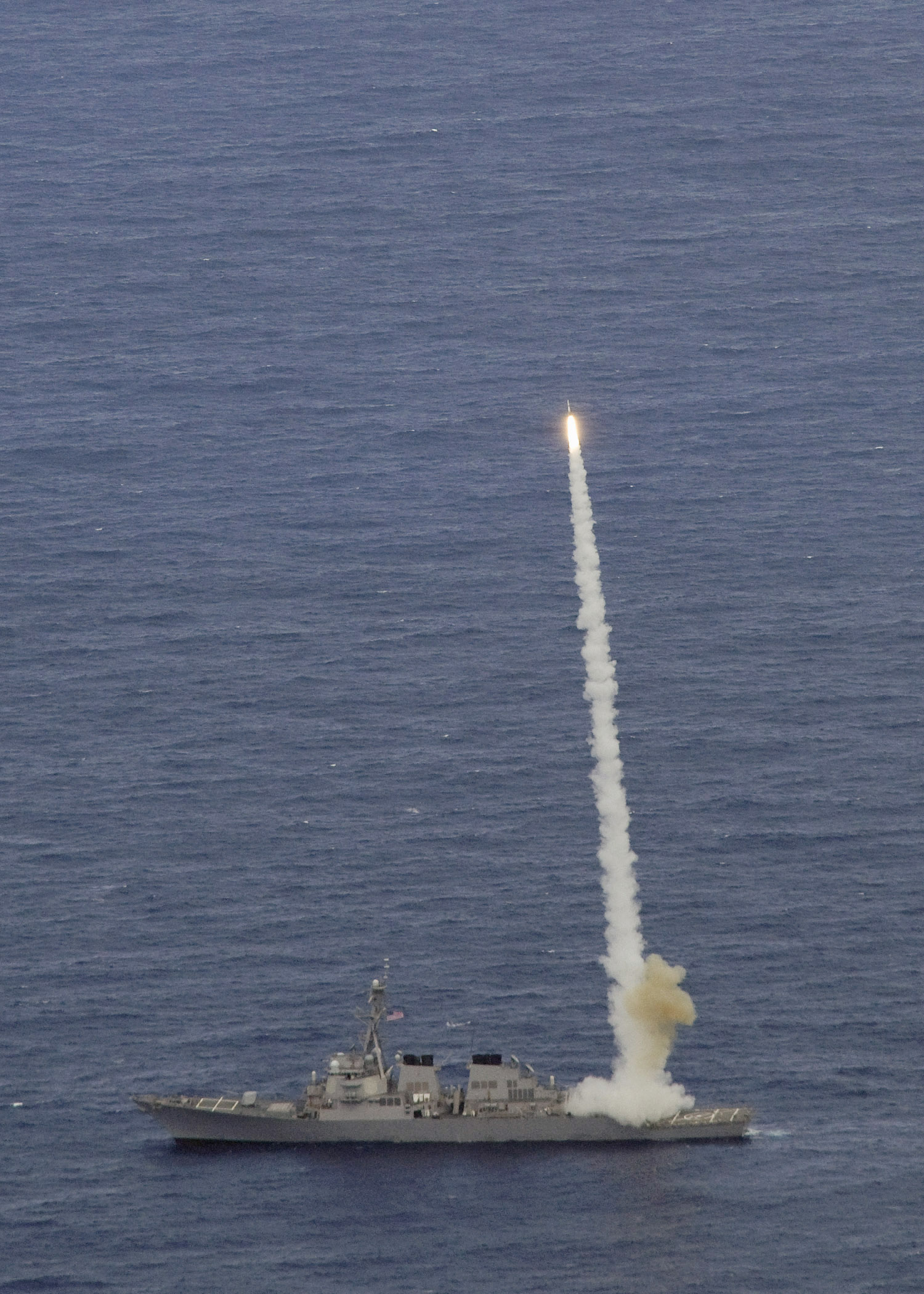
The guided-missile destroyer USS Curtis Wilbur launches a Standard Missile-2 while conducting torpedo evasion maneuvers during Multi-Sail 2009

In the middle 1980s, the SM-2MR was deployed via Mark 41 Vertical Launching System (VLS) aboard USS Bunker Hill, the first U.S. Navy ship to deploy a vertical launcher. VLS has, since 2003, been the only launcher used for the Standard missile in the U.S. Navy aboard Ticonderoga-class cruisers and Arleigh Burke-class destroyers.

The Standard can also be used against ships, either at line-of-sight range using its semi-active homing mode, or over the horizon using inertial guidance and terminal infrared homing.

The SM-2 has conducted more than 2,700 successful live firings. In June 2017, Raytheon announced it was restarting the SM-2 production line to fulfill purchases made by the Netherlands, Japan, Australia, and South Korea. Production had been stopped in 2013 from a lack of international orders. New deliveries of SM-2 Block IIIA and IIIB missiles were scheduled to begin in 2020. The United States Navy is committed to keeping the Standard Missile 2 medium-range viable until 2035.

== Contractors ==
Standard missiles were constructed by General Dynamics Pomona Division until 1992, when it became part of the Hughes Missile Systems Company. Hughes formed a joint venture with Raytheon called Standard Missile Company (SMCo). Hughes Missile Systems was eventually sold to Raytheon making it the sole contractor.

Due to the end of the US Navy's support of the SM-1 missile system, the National Chung-Shan Institute of Science and Technology (NCSIST) has taken over support for the system in Taiwanese service including production of replacement rocket motors. The new rocket motors allow for increased range and the upgrade also included an active radar homing seeker. The same approach was taken for the SM-1's Mark 13 missile launcher with NCIST taking over support.

== Operational history ==
The Standard Missile One became operational in 1968. The missile was utilized by ships equipped with the Tartar Guided Missile Fire Control System. The missile saw its first combat use in the early 1970s in the Vietnam war.

The Standard Missile Two became operational in the late 1970s and was deployed operationally with the Aegis Combat System in 1983. Both Standard One and Two were used against both surface and air targets during Operation Praying Mantis. On July 3, 1988, USS Vincennes mistakenly shot down Iran Air Flight 655, an Airbus A300B2, using two SM-2MRs from her forward launcher. In 1988 the Iranian Kaman-class missile boat Joshan was disabled by RIM-66s.

On 9 October 2016, the Arleigh Burke-class destroyer USS Mason fired two SM-2s, as well as one Evolved Sea Sparrow Missile, at two incoming Houthi anti-ship missiles off the coast of Yemen, one of which struck the water on its own. It is unknown if the SM-2s were responsible for intercepting the second cruise missile. On 12 October, Mason again came under attack by an anti-ship missile, and an SM-2 she fired was confirmed to have intercepted it at a range of 8 miles. This marked the first time in history a warship successfully defended itself with SAMs launched from vertical launch cells against an anti-ship missile. The ship experienced yet a third attack on 15 October, this time with 5 AShMs. She fired SM-2s, destroying four of the missiles.

On 1 April 2020, a Turkish Navy G-class frigate fired at least a SM-1MR Block VIA RIM-66E-05 supposedly against an UAV operated in support of the Libyan National Army. The missile missed and landed near al-Ajaylat, just southwest of Sabratha.

On 19 October 2023, the USS Carney fired SM-2s to shoot down three land-attack cruise missiles and eight drones launched from Houthi-controlled territory in Yemen. The interceptions occurred over the Red Sea; although the ship wasn't threatened, the missiles were headed north towards Israel following the start of the Gaza war. From October 2023 to January 2024, several U.S. Navy destroyers downed dozens of missiles and attack drones launched by the Houthis against ships transiting the Red Sea, primarily using SM-2s. Although the SM-2 effectively intercepted the threats, at a cost of roughly $2.4 million per missile, it is inefficient at shooting down drones, causing concerns about expending them against such cheap targets and depleting a ship's limited VLS capacity.

In February 2024, in a friendly fire incident in the Red Sea, two SM-2s were launched by German frigate Hessen at a US MQ-9 Reaper drone. Both SM-2s crashed into the sea because of "a technical defect".

SM-2s were used by the US in combat in the 2026 Iran war.

== Deployment history ==
The Standard missile is designated by blocks depending upon their technological package.

=== SM-1 Medium Range Block I/II/III/IV, RIM-66A ===
The First Standard missiles entered service in the USN in 1967. Blocks I, II, and III were preliminary versions. Block IV was the production version. This missile was a replacement for the earlier RIM-24C Tartar missile.

=== SM-1 Medium Range Block V, RIM-66B ===
The RIM-66B introduced changes that resulted in higher reliability. A new faster reacting autopilot, a more powerful dual thrust rocket motor, and a new warhead were added. Many RIM-66A missiles were re-manufactured into RIM-66B.

=== SM-1 Medium Range Blocks VI/VIA/VIB, RIM-66E ===
The RIM-66E was the last version of the standard missile one medium-range. This version entered service in 1983 with the United States Navy and export customers. The RIM-66E was used by all remaining Tartar vessels that were not modified to use the New Threat Upgrade and Oliver Hazard Perry-class frigates which controlled it with the Mk92 fire control system. Production of this missile ended in 1987. The missile was retired from USN service in 2003; however there are a large number of this model in service abroad and it is expected to remain viable until 2020.

=== SM-2 Medium Range Block I, RIM-66C/D ===
The RIM-66C was the first version of the Standard missile two. The missile became operational in 1978 with the Aegis combat system fitted to the Ticonderoga-class cruiser. The RIM-66D was the SM-2 medium-range block I version for the New Threat Upgrade. The SM-2 incorporates a new autopilot giving it inertial guidance in all phases of flight except for the terminal intercept where semi-active radar homing is still used. This version is no longer in service; remaining missiles have either been remanufactured into later models or have been put in storage.

=== SM-2 Medium Range Block II, RIM-66G/H/J ===
The Block II missile was introduced in 1983 with a new rocket motor for longer range and a new warhead. The RIM-66G is for the Aegis combat system and the Mk26 missile launcher. The RIM-66H is for Aegis and the Mk41 vertical launcher. The RIM-66J is the version for the New Threat Upgrade. Block II missiles are no longer manufactured, and have been withdrawn from service. The remainder have either been put in storage, scrapped for spare parts, or remanufactured into later models.

=== SM-2 Medium Range Block III/IIIA/IIIB, RIM-66K/L/M ===
The RIM-66M is the version of the Standard missile two medium-range (SM-2MR) currently in service with the USN aboard Ticonderoga-class cruisers and Arleigh Burke-class destroyers. The missile is specifically designed for the Aegis Combat System and the Mk41 Vertical launch system. The Block III missiles differ from earlier blocks by the addition of the MK 45 MOD 9 target detecting device, for improved performance against low altitude targets. The Block IIIB missile additionally has a dual semi-active/infrared seeker for terminal homing. The dual seeker is intended for use in high-ECM environments, against targets over the horizon or with a small radar cross section. The seeker was originally developed for the canceled AIM-7R Sparrow air-to-air missile. All USN Block III and IIIA missiles are to be upgraded to Block IIIB. Block IIIA missiles are operated by the Japanese Maritime Self-Defense Force on its Kongō-class and Atago-class Aegis destroyers. Aegis equipped vessels in the Spanish and South Korean navies use it as well. The Dutch and German Navies have added it to the Anti-Air Warfare system, which uses the Thales Group Active Phased Array Radar S-1850M and Smart-L radar. South Korean KDX-II destroyers use the block IIIA with a New Threat Upgrade compatible guided missile fire control system. Block III variants for Aegis and arm launchers are designated RIM-66L. Block III missiles for New Threat Upgrade systems are designated RIM-66K. Block IIIB missiles were not produced for the New Threat Upgrade. Blocks IIIA and IIIB are the current production versions. The Thales Nederland STIR 1.8 and 2.4 fire control systems are also supported.

=== SM-2 Medium Range Block IIIC ===
The SM-2 Block IIIC is a modified version of the Block III/IIIA/IIIB missile that features a dual mode semi-active and active missile seeker based on the SM-6 Block I. Additionally, the missile has a new dorsal fin design and a thrust vectoring jet tab assembly to control trajectory as the missile egresses the launcher. In 2018, the U.S. Navy awarded Raytheon Missile Systems a $149.4 million contract for engineering, manufacturing, and development of the Block IIIC. In July 2021, the U.S. Navy awarded Raytheon Missile Systems a $45 million contract for the low-rate initial production of the Block IIIC. In July 2022, the U.S. Navy fired Block IIIC missiles against four targets during testing on USS Frank E. Petersen Jr. (DDG-121). The U.S. Navy expects to field the Block IIIC in 2QFY24. U.S. Navy Arleigh Burke-class destroyers and Constellation-class frigates will be armed with the Block IIIC.

In October 2024, the Australian Government announced that it will acquire the Block IIIC for the Royal Australian Navy's Hobart-class destroyers. The State Department had approved the sale of the Block IIIC to Australia in August 2021. In November 2020, the State Department approved the sale of the Block IIIC to Canada for their planned Canadian Surface Combatant class.

=== SM-2 Medium Range Block IIICU ===
The SM-2 Medium Range Block IIICU is modified version of the Block IIIC missile that will feature a new guidance section and target detection device from the SM-6 Block IU. In April 2024, Raytheon was awarded a $344 million contract to develop the Block IIICU and the SM-6 Block IU.

=== Deployment ===
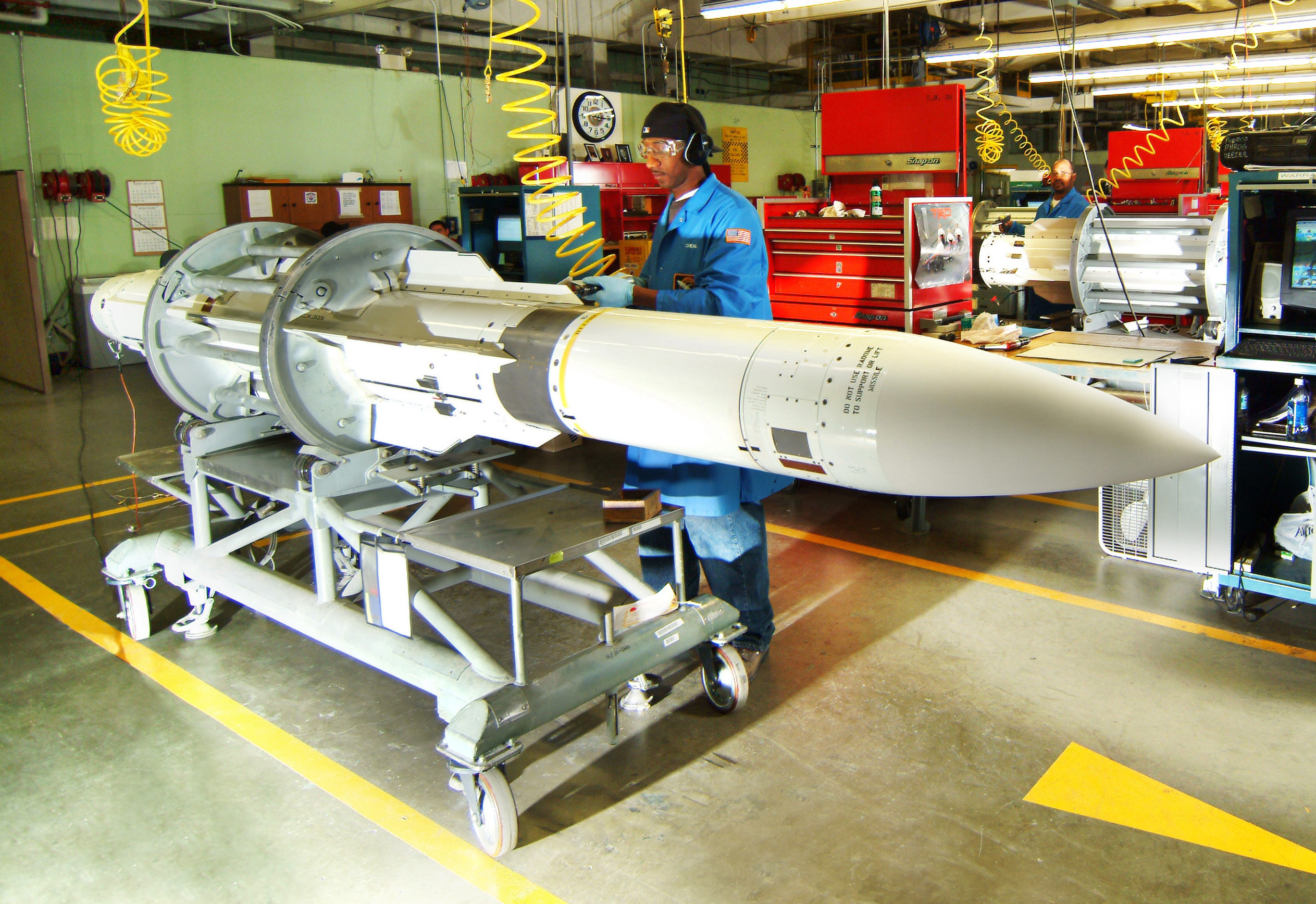
A RIM-66 being assembled.

In the US Navy, RIM-66 Standard was deployed on ships of the following classes, replacing RIM-24 Tartar in some cases:

- Charles F. Adams-class destroyer (Mk 74 Missile Fire Control)
- Albany-class cruiser (Mk 74 Missile Fire Control)
- Oliver Hazard Perry-class frigate (Mk 92 Missile Fire Control)
- Kidd-class destroyer (Mk 74 Missile Fire Control SM-1/later New Threat Upgrade for SM-2)
- California-class cruiser (Mk 74 Missile Fire Control SM-1/later New Threat Upgrade for SM-2)
- Virginia-class cruiser (Mk 74 Missile Fire Control SM-1/later New Threat Upgrade for SM-2)
- Ticonderoga-class cruiser (Aegis Combat System)
- Arleigh Burke-class destroyer (Aegis Combat System)
- Zumwalt-class destroyer (TSCEI)

RIM-66 has also been widely exported and is in service in other navies worldwide.

== Variants ==
Designation	Block	Platform	Notes
YRIM-66A	Prototype		Test flights starting in 1965.
RIM-66A	SM-1MR Block I to IV	Digital Tartar	In service 1967, Conscan radar seeker. SM-1MR Block IV was the main production variant. All rebuilt into Block V missiles.: ECCM improvements; Reduced minimum range; Shortened acquisition time for surface targets
RIM-66B	SM-1MR Block V	Digital Tartar	Replaced the RIM-24C; Plane scanning seeker; Faster-reacting autopilot; MK 90 blast-fragmentation warhead; Aerojet MK 56 dual-thrust rocket motor
RIM-66C	SM-2MR Block I	Aegis combat system and MK 26 GMLS	In service 1978. First Aegis version.: Inertial/Command guidance introduced; MK 115 blast-fragmentation warhead; Monopulse seeker for ECM resistance
RIM-66D	SM-2MR Block I	New Threat Upgrade	In service 1978. First New Threat Upgrade version.: Nearly identical to RIM-66C
RIM-66E	SM-1MR Blocks VI, VIA, VIB	Digital Tartar and Mk 92 Fire Control System.	In service 1983. Version still in service with export customers.: Monopulse seeker developed for SM-2; Introduced MK 45 MOD 4 proximity fuze (also known as TDD - Target Detection Device); MK 115 warhead of SM-2; MK 45 MOD 6 and MK 45 MOD 7 proximity fuzes in Block VIA (RIM-66E-5) and Block VIB (RIM-66E-6) respectively
RIM-66G	SM-2MR Block II	Aegis combat system and MK 26 GMLS	In service 1983. For Aegis ships.: Introduced Thiokol MK 104 rocket motor, almost doubling the effective range; High-velocity fragmentation warhead
RIM-66H	SM-2MR Block II	Aegis combat system and Mk 41 VLS	For Aegis ships with MK 41 VLS (Vertical Launch System)
RIM-66J	SM-2MR Block II	New Threat Upgrade	For Tartar ships. All Block II missiles have been withdrawn from service. Many have been rebuilt as Block III missiles.
RIM-66K-1	SM-2MR Block III	New Threat Upgrade	In service 1988. For Tartar ships.: Improved MK 45 MOD 9 Target Detecting Device, for better performance against low-altitude targets
RIM-66K-2	SM-2MR Block IIIA	New Threat Upgrade	In service 1991. For Tartar ships. In Production.: MK 125 warhead with heavier grain explosive
RIM-66L-1	SM-2MR Block III	Aegis combat system and MK 26 GMLS	In service 1988. For Aegis ships.: Improved MK 45 MOD 9 Target Detecting Device, for better performance against low-altitude targets
RIM-66L-2	SM-2MR Block IIIA	Aegis combat system and MK 26 GMLS	In service 1991. For Aegis ships.: MK 125 warhead with heavier grain explosive
RIM-66M-1, -4	SM-2MR Block III	Aegis combat system and MK 41 VLS	In service 1988. For Aegis ships with MK 41 VLS.: Improved MK 45 MOD 9 Target Detecting Device, for better performance against low-altitude targets
RIM-66M-2, -3	SM-2MR Block IIIA	Aegis combat system and MK 41 VLS, Spain, Netherlands, Germany, Australia, other foreign navies	In service 1991. For Aegis ships with MK 41 VLS. In production.: MK 125 warhead with heavier grain explosive
RIM-66M-5, -7, -8, -09, -10, -11	SM-2MR Block IIIB	Aegis combat system and MK 41 VLS, JMSDF	In service 1998. For Aegis ships with MK 41 VLS. In production.: Missile Homing Improvement Program (MHIP), dual IR / SARH seeker, IR seeker mounted on side fairing.; -09: Improved MK 45 MOD 14 TDD, 2006; -10: Maneuverability Upgrade 2 (MU-2), MK 97 MOD 0 guidance section, 2007
RIM-66N-1	SM-2MR Block IIIAZ	TSCE-I/ZCS and MK 57 PVLS	Produced as conversion kits for Block IIIA between 2017 and 2018, test fired in 2020. For Zumwalt-class destroyer with MK 57 PVLS. Full production pending contract award in 2021.: Block IIIA with JUWL (Joint Universal Weapon Link), ICWI (interrupted continuous wave illumination) for compatibility with AN/SPY-3.
RIM-66P	SM-2MR Block IIIC	Aegis combat system and MK 41 VLS	Development announced 2017: Active terminal guidance, improved ECCM, enhanced fuzing

Table sources, reference material:

== Land Attack Standard Missile ==
The RGM-165 LASM, also given the designation SM-4, was intended as means to give long-range precision fires in support of the US Marine Corps. Intended as an adaptation of the RIM-66, it retained the original MK 125 warhead and MK 104 rocket motor, with the radar seeker replaced by GPS/INS guidance. While test fired in 1997 using three modified RIM-66K SM-2MR Block III missiles, with 800 missiles set for replacement and IOC expected for 2003/2004, it was canceled in 2002 due to limited capabilities against mobile or hardened targets.

== Operators ==
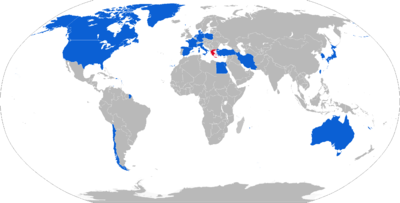
Map shows the RIM-66 MR operator as of 2015 (former operators in red)

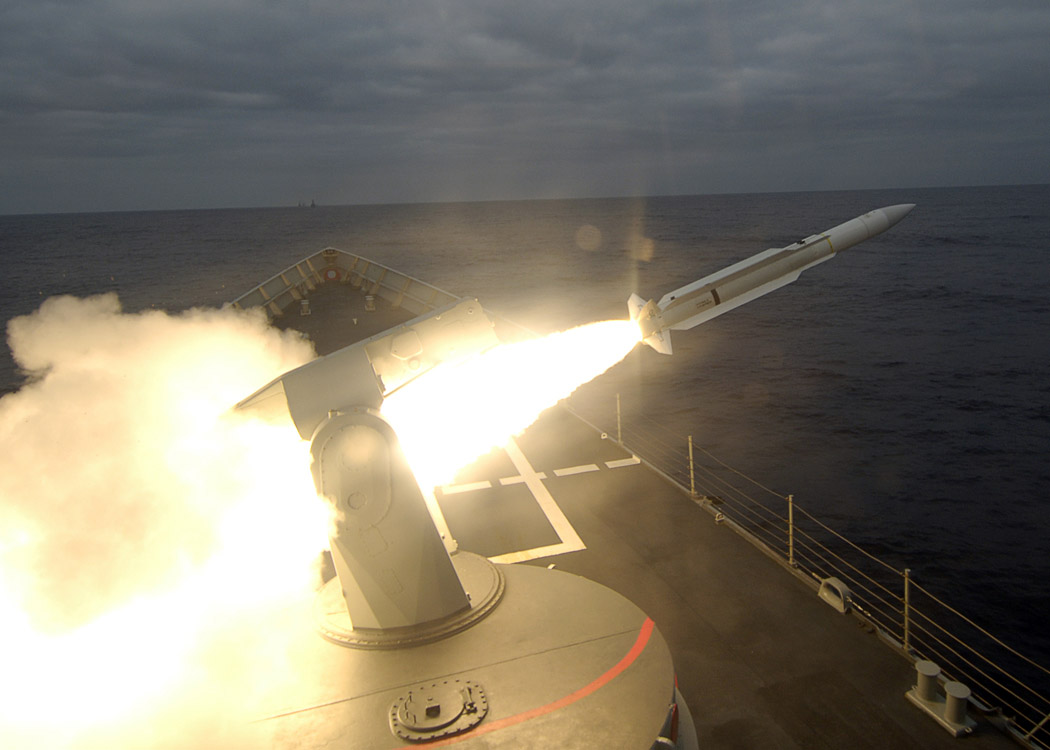
A RIM-66 being launched in 2006 from the Spanish frigate Canarias

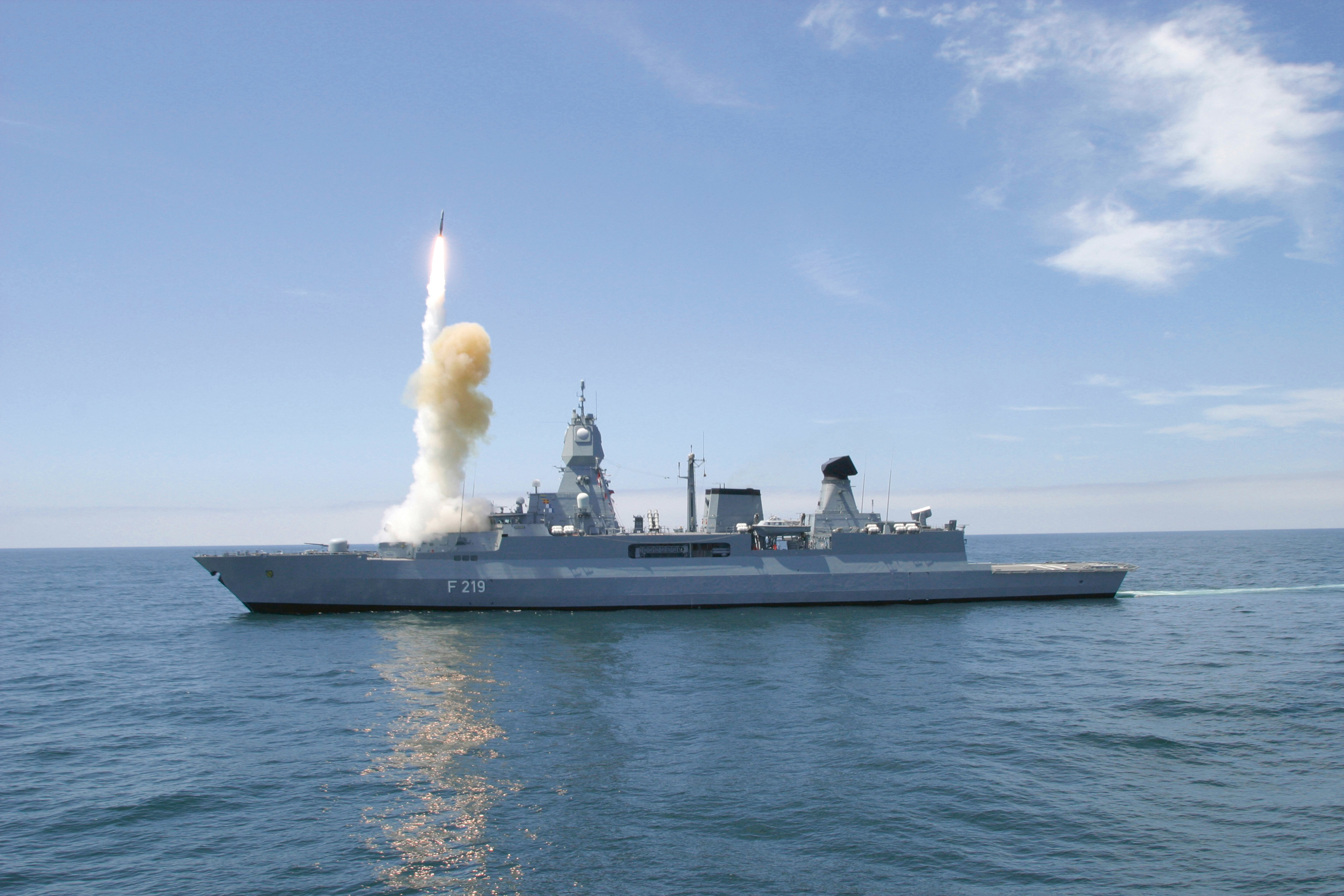
German Sachsen-class frigate Sachsen launching a RIM-66.

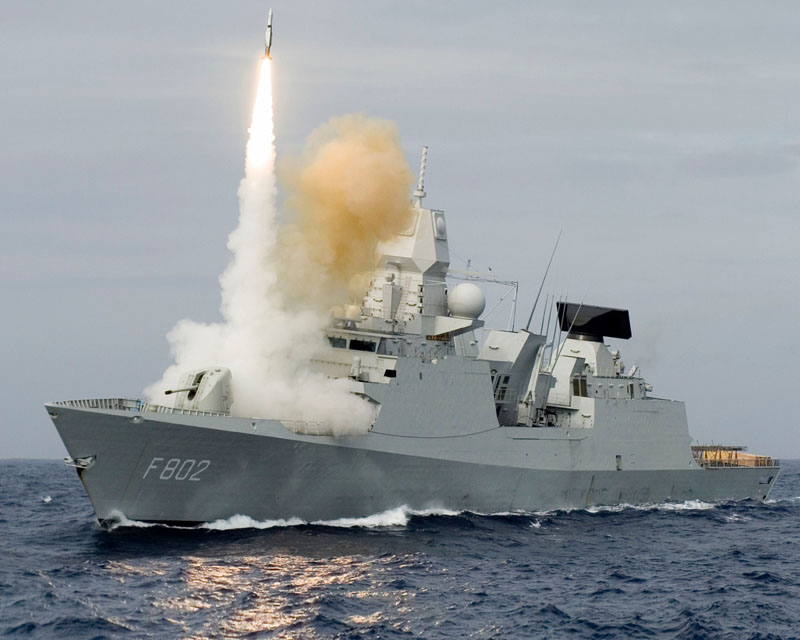
HNLMS De Zeven Provinciën launching a RIM-66.

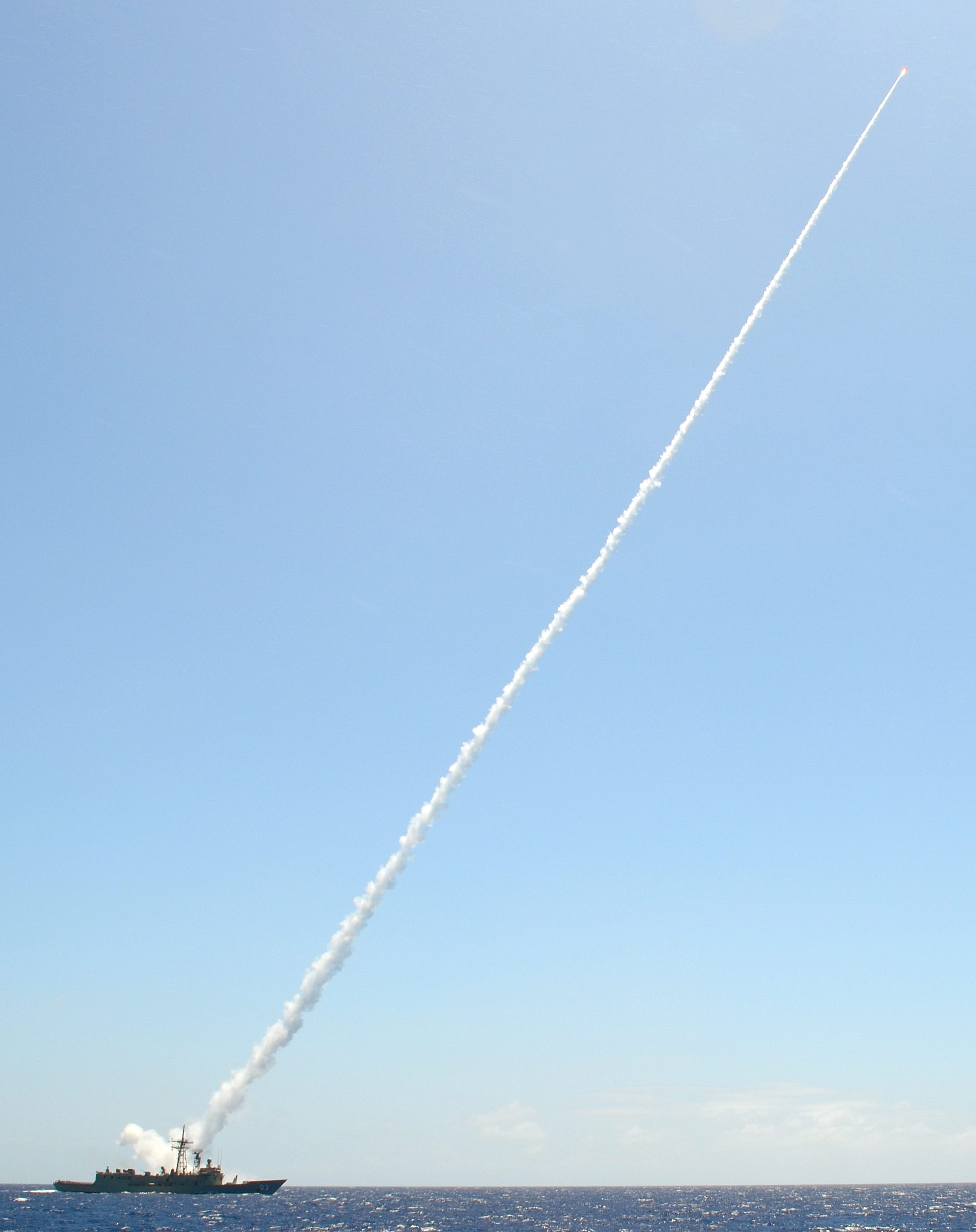
HMAS Sydney launches an SM-2

=== Current operators ===
Australia

- Royal Australian Navy (Onboard Hobart class destroyers)

Chile

- Chilean Navy (Onboard Adelaide-class frigates)

Denmark

- Royal Danish Navy (Onboard Iver Huitfeldt-class frigates)

Egypt

- Egyptian Navy (Onboard Oliver Hazard Perry-class frigates)

Germany

- German Navy (Onboard Sachsen-class & future F-127 frigates)

Italy

- Italian Navy (Onboard Durand de la Penne-class destroyers)

Japan

- Japan Maritime Self Defense Force (Onboard Hatakaze-class, Maya-class, Kongō-class & Atago-class destroyers)

Netherlands

- Royal Netherlands Navy (Onboard De Zeven Provinciën-class frigates)

Poland

- Polish Navy (onboard Oliver Hazard Perry-class frigates)

Pakistan

- Pakistan Navy (onboard Oliver Hazard Perry-class frigates)

South Korea

- Republic of Korea Navy (onboard Chungmugong Yi Sun-sin-class & Sejong the Great-class destroyers)

Spain

- Spanish Navy (onboard Santa María-class & Álvaro de Bazán-class frigates)

Taiwan

- ROC Navy (onboard Cheng Kung-class & Chi Yang-class frigates, Kee Lung-class destroyers). Some SM-1 have been upgraded by NCSIST with an improved propulsion section and an active seeker.

Turkey

- Turkish Navy (Onboard G-class frigates)

United States

- United States Navy (Onboard Arleigh Burke-class destroyers & Ticonderoga-class cruisers)

=== Former operators ===
Canada

- Royal Canadian Navy (Onboard Iroquois-class destroyers)

France

- French Navy (onboard Cassard-class frigates 1988–2021)

Greece

- Hellenic Navy (onboard Charles F. Adams-class destroyers 1991–2004)

== See also ==
=== Related development ===
- AGM-78 Standard ARM
- AIM-97 Seekbat
- RIM-67 Standard

=== Similar role ===
- Aster (missile family) – (France, Italy)
- Barak 8 – (India, Israel)
- RIM-8 Talos – (United States)
- Sea Dart – (United Kingdom)
- Masurca – (France)
- List of United States Navy Guided Missile Launching Systems
