= AGM-78 Standard ARM =

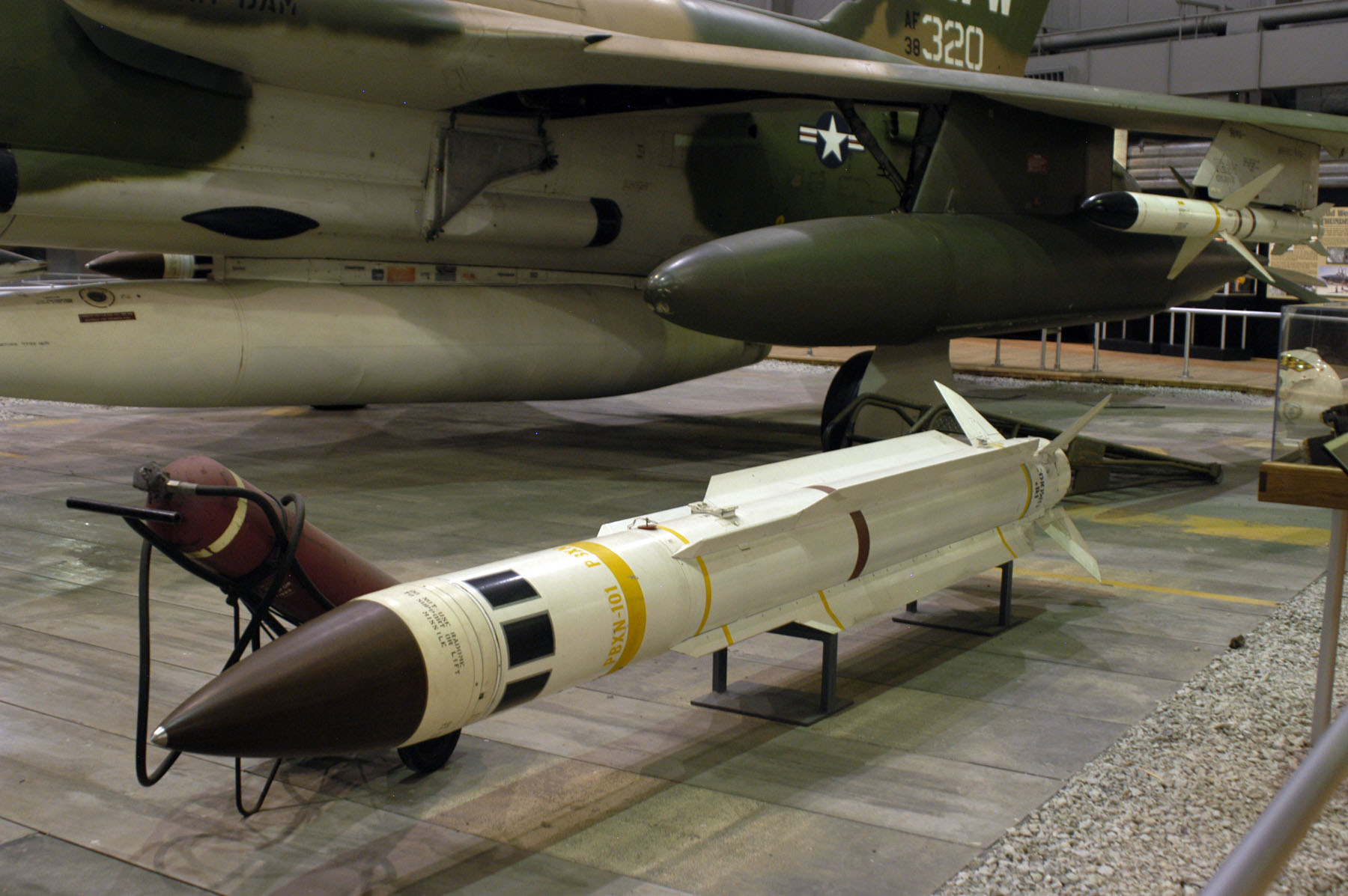
- Type: Air-to-surface anti-radiation missile
- Place of origin: United States

Service history
- In service: 1968–1988
- Wars: Vietnam War

Production history
- Designer: General Dynamics
- Designed: 1967
- Produced: 1967–1976
- No. built: 3,000+

Specifications
- Mass: 620 kg (1370 lb)
- Length: 4.57 m (15 ft)
- Diameter: 34.3 cm (13.5 in)
- Wingspan: 108 cm (42.5 in)
- Warhead weight: 97 kg (215 lb) blast-fragmentation
- Engine: Aerojet MK 27 MOD 4 dual-thrust solid-fueled rocket
- Operational range: 90 km (56 mi)
- Maximum speed: Mach 1.8
- Guidance system: Passive radar homing
- Launch platform: A-6B/E Intruder, F-105G Thunderchief, F-4G Phantom II

The AGM-78 Standard ARM or STARM was an anti-radiation missile developed by General Dynamics, United States. It was built on the airframe of the RIM-66 Standard surface-to-air missile, resulting in a very large weapon with considerable range, allowing it to attack targets as much as 50 miles (80 km) away.

== Overview ==
Originally developed for the US Navy during the late 1960s, the AGM-78 was created in large part because of the limitations of the AGM-45 Shrike, which suffered from a small warhead, limited range and a poor guidance system. General Dynamics was asked to create an air-launched ARM by modifying the RIM-66 SM-1 surface-to-air missile. This use of an "off the shelf" design greatly reduced development costs, and trials of the new weapon began in 1967 after only a year of development. The first operational missiles were issued in early 1968.

The AGM-78 was known as the STARM by the U.S. Navy, an abbreviation of Standard ARM. The first version of the missile, the AGM-78A-1 or STARM Mod 0, was little more than an air-launched RIM-66 with the Shrike's anti radar seeker head attached to the front. An Aerojet Mark 27 MOD 4 dual-thrust solid-rocket-powered the missile, which was fitted with a blast-fragmentation warhead. Although more capable, the AGM-78 was much more expensive than the AGM-45 Shrike which continued in service for some time. The new missile was carried by the F-105F/G and the A-6B/E.

== Variants ==
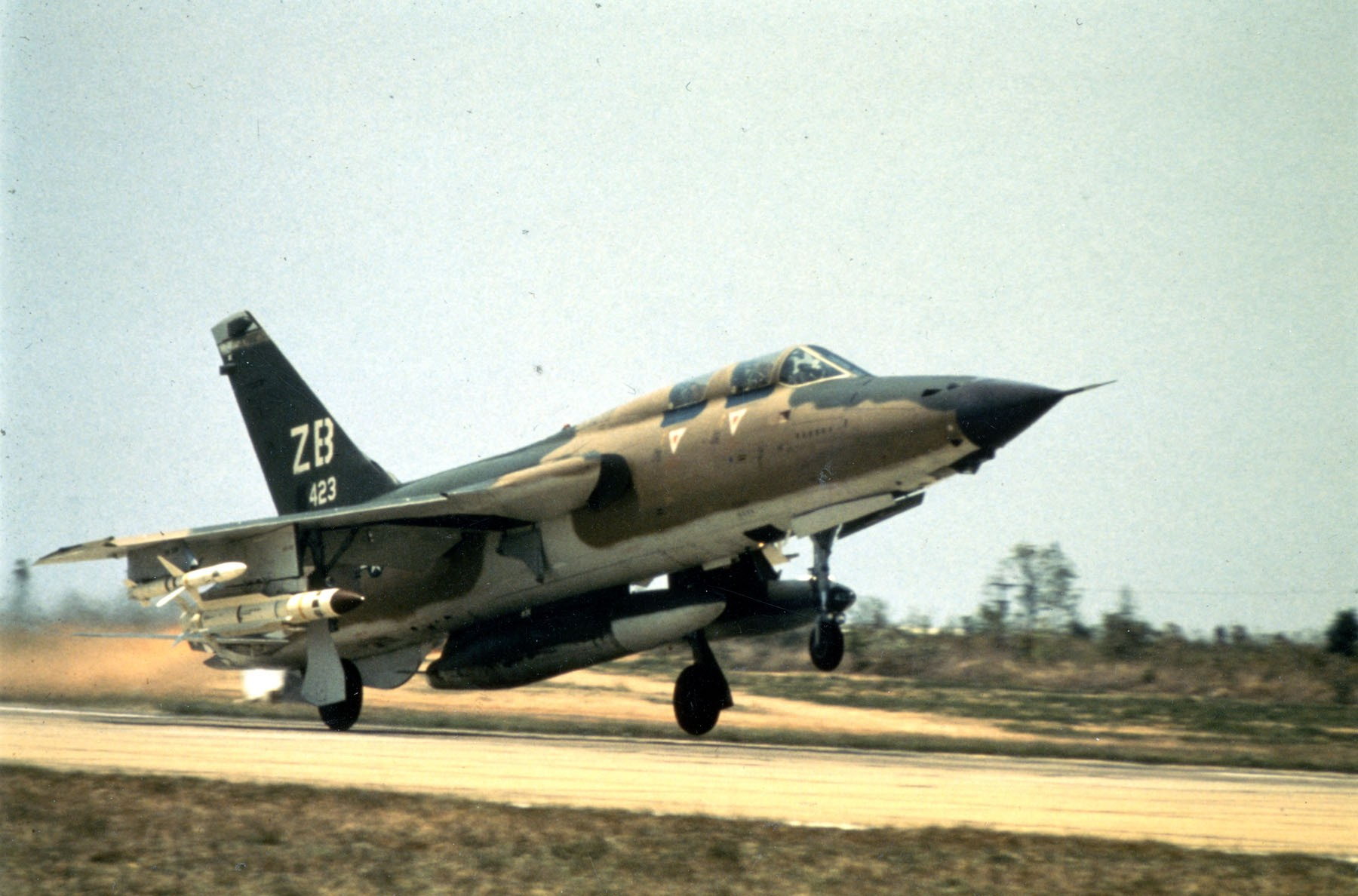
A 6010th WWS F-105G taking off to North Vietnam, 1971.

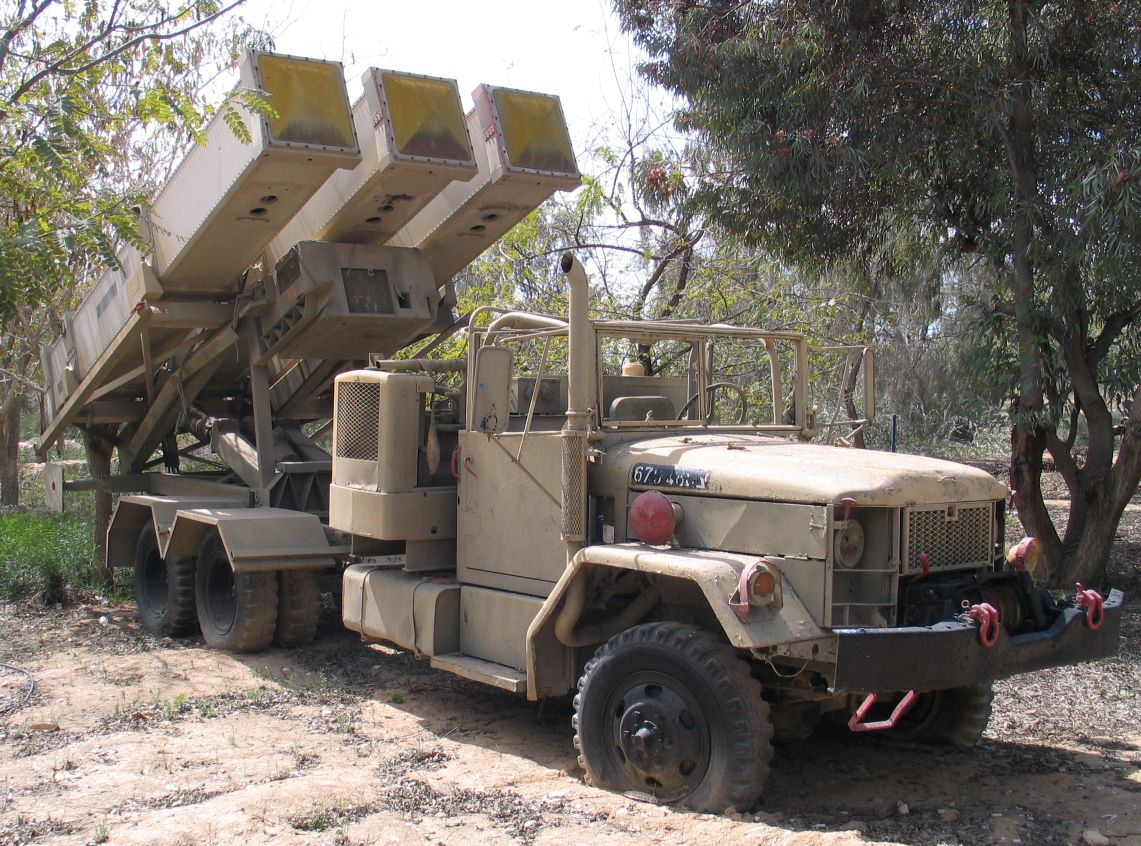
Israeli Keres AGM-78 Standard ARM launcher at IAF Museum

An inert training version of the AGM-78A was built as ATM-78A. Of equal size, mass and shape, the missile lacked a seeker head, warhead, or propulsion systems and was essentially just a dead weight.

An A-2 model introduced a bomb damage assessment (BDA) capability and an SDU-6/B phosphorus target marker flare to facilitate targeting of the site for follow-up attacks.

In 1969 an improved model called the AGM-78B was produced. This featured a broadband seeker which allowed the missile to be used against a much wider variety of targets without having to select the seeker before the mission. A simple memory circuit was also included, allowing the missile to attack a target once it locked on, even if the radar was shut down. Previous ARMs would veer off course and miss when they lost a target, and as a result flipping the radar on and off had become a standard tactic for missile batteries.

Some early AGM-78A-1s were updated with the new memory circuit and seeker. These missiles were designated as the AGM-78A-4. The AGM-78B was the most important version of the missile, and was widely used by the Air Force's F-4G Phantom II Wild Weasel aircraft.

A training version of the AGM-78B was created, and was known as the ATM-78B.

In the early 1970s the AGM-78C was produced. A US Air Force project, the C model was primarily intended to be more reliable and cheaper to build. It had a SDU-29/B white phosphorus target marker. Some older missiles were upgraded to the AGM-78C standard. As before, an ATM-78C training missile was produced.

Between 1973 and 1976 the AGM-78D was produced, introducing a new motor. A follow-up missile, the AGM-78D-2, had an active optical fuze, still greater reliability, and a new 100 kg (220 lb) blast-fragmentation warhead. The ATM-78D training missile followed.

The RGM-66D shipborne anti-radiation missile used the basic AGM-78 airframe along with features of the RIM-66 and AIM-97 Seekbat air-to-air missile.

Including all versions, over 3,000 AGM-78 missiles were built. Production stopped in the late 1970s, but the missile continued in service for almost a decade before the last examples were replaced by the AGM-88 HARM in the late 1980s.

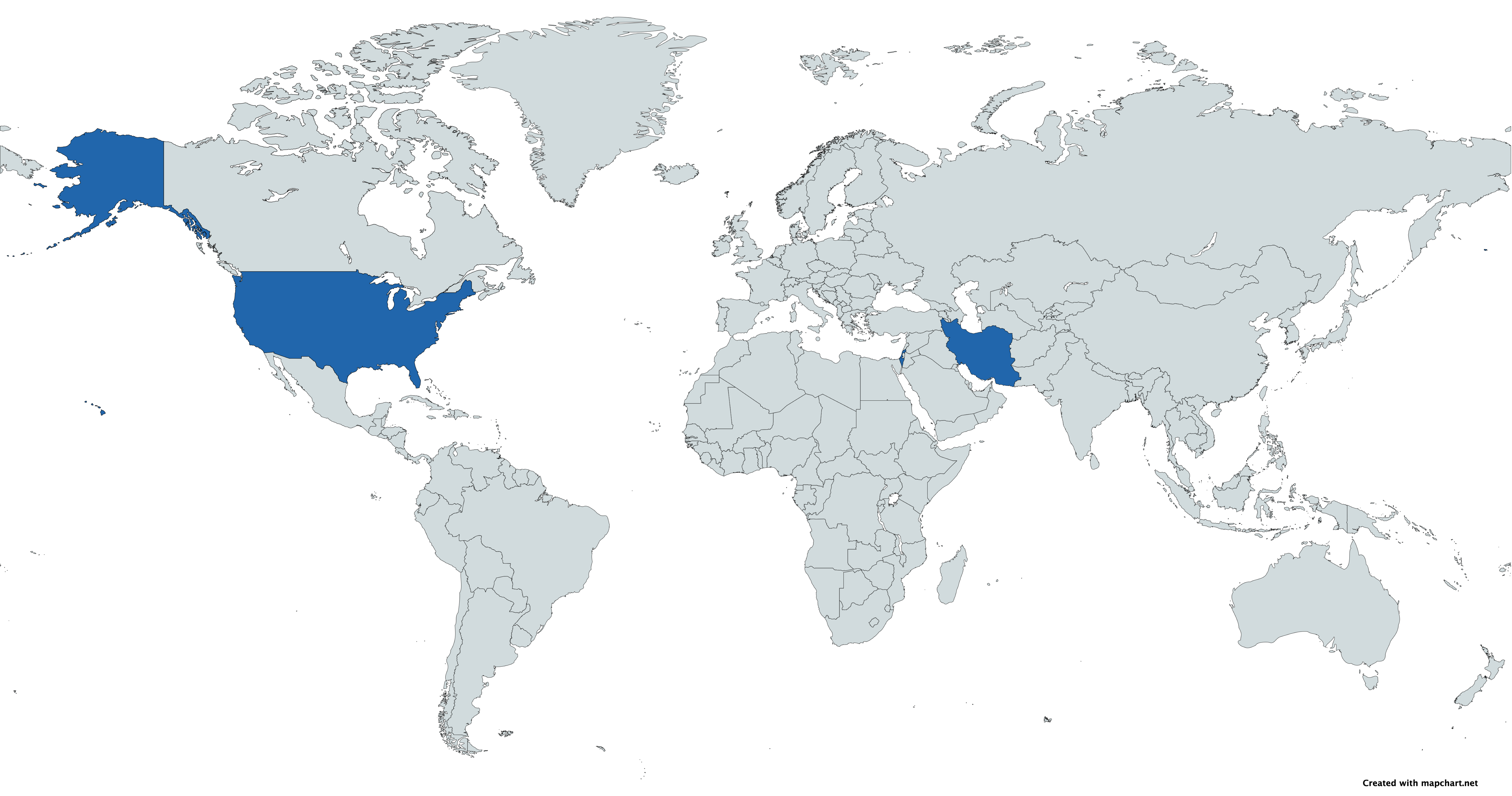
Map with operators of the AGM-78 Standard ARM in blue

== Operators ==
- United States
- Israel
- Iran

== See also ==
- AIM-97 Seekbat - An air to air version of this missile
- AIM-174B Gunslinger - another air-launched Standard Missile variant
