= Armored Box Launcher =

Launch container for the Tomahawk Cruise Missile

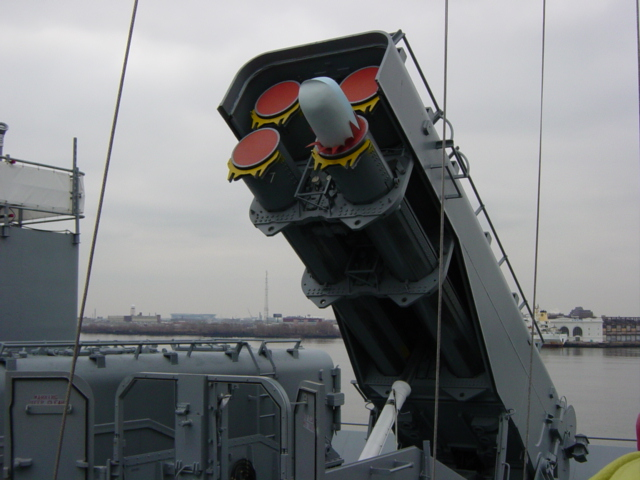
A close-up look at an Armored Box Launcher unit, this one aboard USS New Jersey.

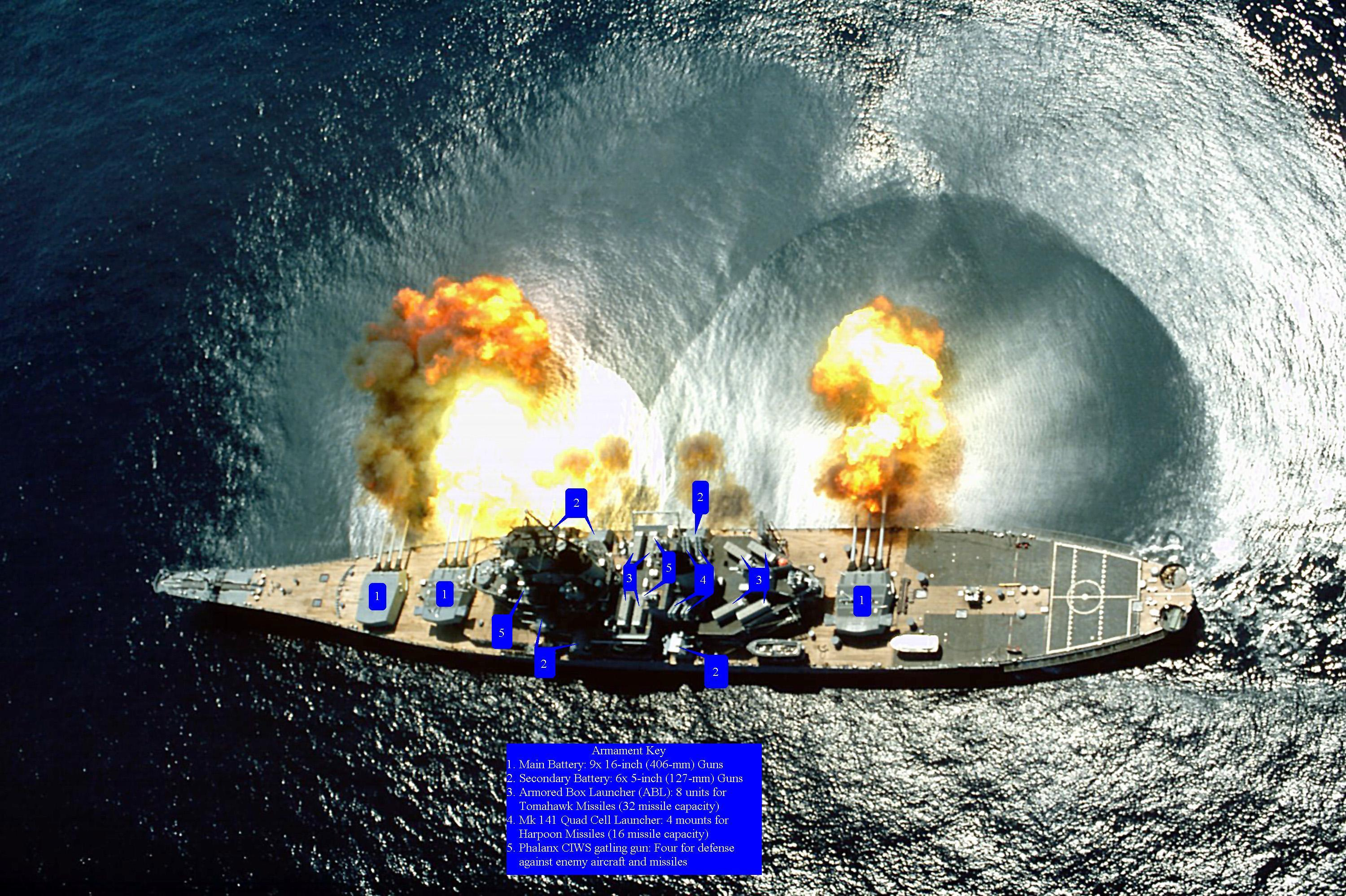
The large platforms (numbered #3) located roughly in the middle of battleship USS Iowa contain the Armored Box Launchers, distinguishable by their lighter grey color.

The Mark 143 Armored Box Launcher (ABL) is a four-round protected launch container for the BGM-109 Tomahawk Cruise Missile.

Fitted to the Iowa-class battleship following their 1980s recommissioning upgrade, each ABL contains four ready-to-fire Tomahawks. The use of ABLs on these vessels rather than a non-armored solution was necessitated to enable the battleships to continue to exploit the capability provided by their heavy armor and reduce the vulnerability of the delicate missiles within. Eight ABLs were fitted to each of the four recommissioned battleships, providing 32 weapons to each ship. Some of the original dual 5 inch (127 mm) gun mounts were removed to fit the ABLs.

As well as being fitted on to the United States Navy's Iowa-class battleships, this system was also fitted on the nuclear-powered cruisers, including the USS Long Beach and the Virginia class as well as some Spruance class destroyers (Comte de Grasse, Merrill, Conolly, John Rodgers, Leftwich, Deyo, and Ingersoll). The cruisers and destroyers were fitted with two ABLs each for a total of 8 missiles.

Since then the Armored Box Launcher missile system has been phased out in favor of the more flexible, larger capacity Vertical Launching System (VLS).

The Armored Box Launcher shares one common handicap with the Vertical Launching System: It can not be reloaded at sea. The ship must return to port in order to receive and load her ABLs.
