= RGM-59 Taurus =

ZRGM-59A Taurus
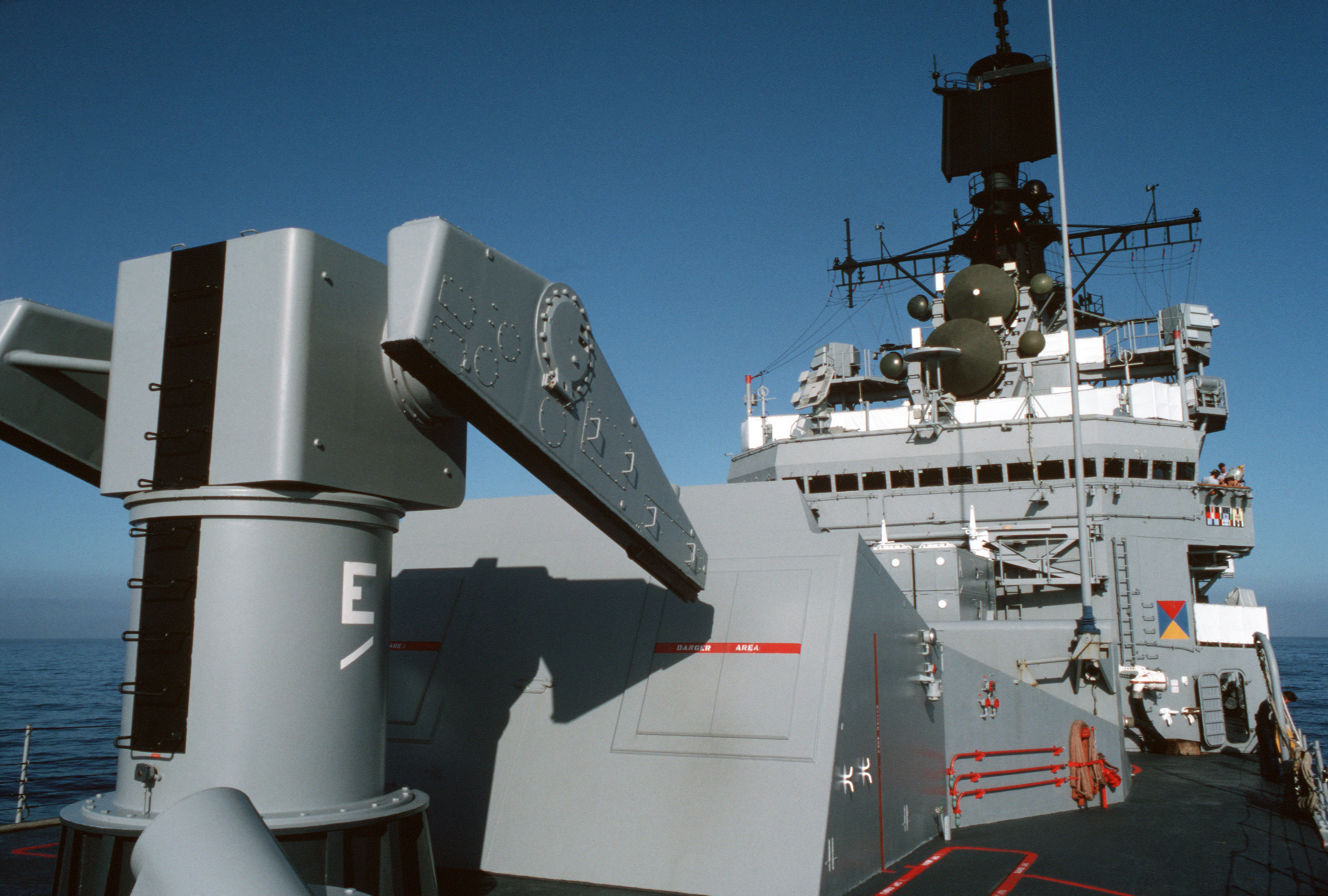
- A Mk 10 launcher, of the type intended for use by Taurus
- Type: Surface-to-surface missile
- Place of origin: United States

Service history
- Used by: United States Navy

Production history
- Designed: 1961–1965
- Manufacturer: Applied Physics Laboratory
- No. built: 0

Specifications
- Warhead: Conventional
- Warhead weight: 1,000 pounds (450 kg)
- Operational range: 19 to 58 mi (31 to 93 km)
- Guidance system: Midcourse: Inertial; Terminal: Passive homing

The RGM-59 Taurus was an American project, conducted by the United States Navy, that was intended to develop a surface-to-surface missile for use as a fire support weapon during amphibious landings, replacing heavy-caliber naval guns. Developed during the early 1960s, the project was cancelled before any hardware development was undertaken.

== Design and development ==
In August 1961, the United States Navy issued a requirement for a new type of surface-to-surface missile, called the Landing Force Support Weapon (LFSW), that was intended to replace the battleship and heavy cruiser force - then being retired - in the role of providing fire support of troops conducting amphibious landings.

The LFSW requirement specified a rocket-powered missile, armed with a conventional warhead, that would have an effective range of at least 34 miles (55 km). The LSFW missile was required to be equally as effective against soft targets as the naval guns and the unguided rockets that it was intended to replace. Studies regarding the guidance system of the LFSW were conducted by the Applied Physics Laboratory, which determined that the ideal solution for the new missile was for it to utilise inertial guidance during the midcourse phase of its flight. Terminal guidance would be provided by a tracking beacon, operated by the troops, or remotely by a DASH drone, or by some variants of the Grumman OV-1 Mohawk, in the battle area. The missile, having locked onto the beacon, would offset from the beacon's position by an amount specified in the beacon signal, thereby striking the target with a high degree of accuracy.

== Cancellation and follow-ups ==
Designated ZRGM-59A Taurus in June 1963, the refined design for the LFSW missile specified that it should be capable of utilising the same launchers as the Terrier surface-to-air missile; the missile's accuracy was projected to be within a range of 30 to 210 yards (27 to 192 m), depending on whether or not the target beacon was operational.

The Taurus' guidance system was intended to begin testing, using modified MGM-29 Sergeant missiles, in 1965; one source states that Lockheed had been selected to develop the missile's airframe. Before any hardware for the project had been constructed, however, the project was cancelled during 1965. With the cancellation of the RGM-59 project, studies turned to a navalised variant of the MGM-52 Lance missile to provide shore landing fire support; in addition, an armed version of the Ryan Firebee drone was proposed to meet the LSFW requirement. Due to funding restrictions, however, nothing would come of these projects as well.

In March 1967, the Naval Weapons Center proposed another LFSW missile system, that was intended to have a secondary role of the destruction of enemy air defenses. Intended for launch from existing guided missile cruisers and destroyers, as well as being carried by ballistic missile submarines, the new missile was intended to use terrain reference guidance, and was expected to have accuracy of 200 yards (180 m). However, this project also came to naught, leaving the role of a U.S. Navy ship-to-shore missile unfilled until the arrival of the BGM-109 Tomahawk during the 1980s.

== See also ==
- Naval gunfire support
- USS Carronade (IFS-1)
