= AIM-97 Seekbat =

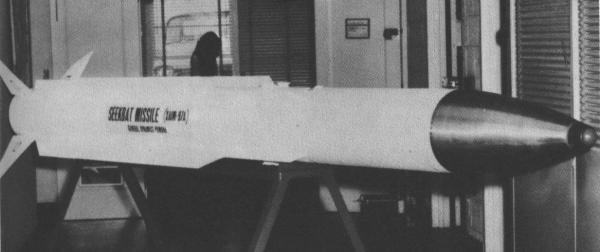
- Type: Air-to-air missile
- Place of origin: United States

Production history
- Manufacturer: General Dynamics

Specifications
- Mass: 1,300 pounds (590 kg)
- Length: 15 feet (4.6 m)
- Diameter: 13.5 inches (340 mm)
- Wingspan: 42.5 inches (1,080 mm)
- Warhead: Blast-fragmentation
- Engine: Aerojet MK 27 dual-thrust solid-fuel rocket
- Operational range: 56 miles (90 km)
- Flight ceiling: 80,000 feet (24,000 m)
- Maximum speed: >Mach 3
- Guidance system: terminal infrared homing
- Launch platform: Aircraft

The AIM-97 Seekbat or XAIM-97A Seek Bat was a long-range air-to-air missile developed by the United States. It was intended to counter the perceived capabilities of the Mikoyan-Gurevich MiG-25 and proposed to arm both the F-15 Eagle and F-4 Phantom, the missile ultimately never entered service.

== Overview ==
In the early to mid-1970s the United States was highly concerned by the perceived capabilities of the MiG-25, an aircraft which was known to be capable of speeds in excess of Mach 3 and which carried long-range air-to-air missiles. It was widely claimed that the Foxbat was a new generation "super-fighter", capable of comfortably outclassing any US or allied aircraft. The US initiated the F-15 Eagle program largely in response to this threat. To equip the F-15 the Air Force initiated development of the AIM-82 short-range missile and the AIM-97 Seekbat. The former was a dogfighting missile intended as a replacement for the AIM-9 Sidewinder, the latter was to be a new high-altitude long-range missile designed specifically to shoot down the MiG-25 - hence the name "Seekbat", the "bat" referring to the MiG-25's "Foxbat" NATO reporting name.

The Seekbat was based on the AGM-78 Standard ARM. It had a modified propulsion unit and used an infrared seeker for terminal guidance of the missile. The operational ceiling was 80,000 ft (24,000 m).

Test firings began in late 1972, (Note: Hewish in his March 1974 article states that the missile had been "...undergoing flight-test for more than a year.") but the Seekbat program did not make a great deal of progress and was cancelled in 1976. By this time new knowledge of the MiG-25s capabilities and role led to the cancellation of the program because the missile's cost did not justify its procurement.

== See also ==
- Brazo
- R-27 (air-to-air missile)
- AIM-174B
