= Theatre ballistic missile =

Type of ballistic missile

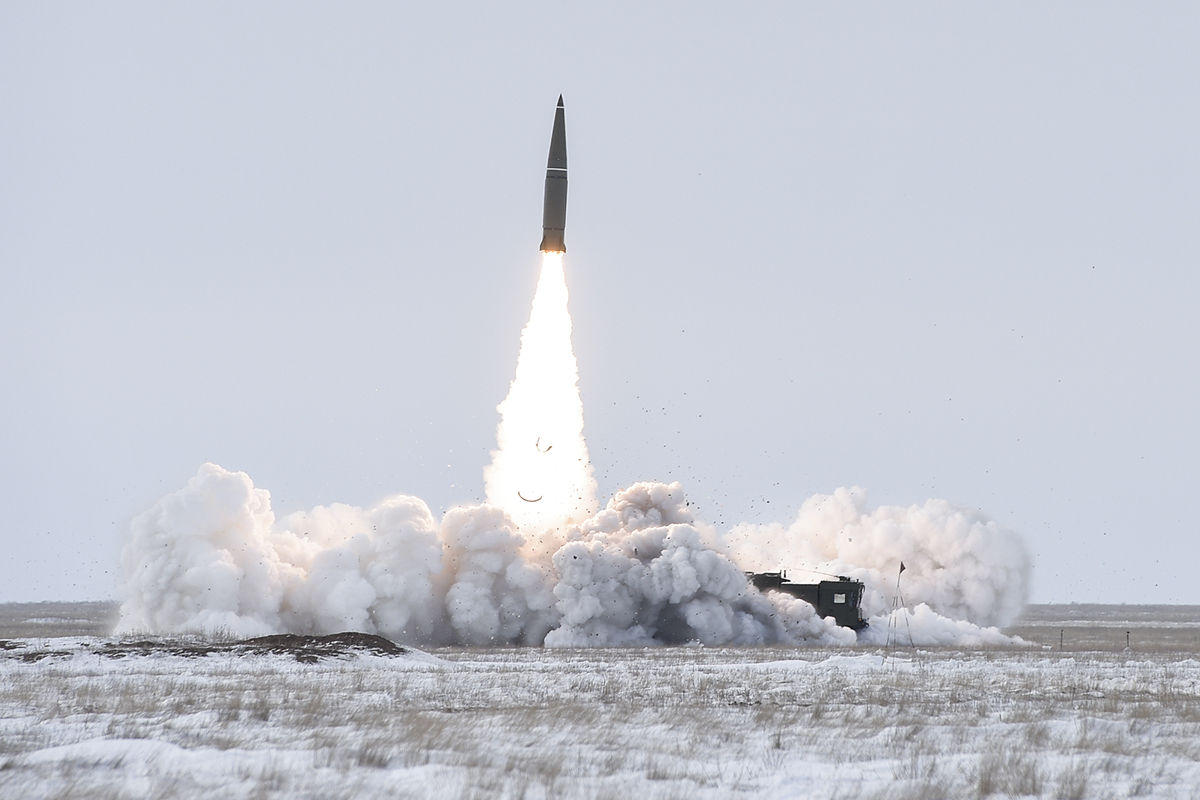
The Iskander-M ballistic missile, extensively being used in the Russian invasion of Ukraine

Theatre ballistic missile (TBM) is a term sometimes used to refer to short and medium-ranged ballistic missiles.

== Specific theatre ballistic missiles ==
Specific types of theatre ballistic missiles (current, past and under development) include:

Brazil

- Brazilian short-range ballistic missile – 300 kilometres (190 mi)

China

- B-611 – 80–260 kilometres (50–162 mi)
- BP-12/A – 80–280 kilometres (50–174 mi)
- Type 621 – 80–280 kilometres (50–174 mi)
- Type 631 – 400 kilometres (250 mi)
- DF-11 – 280–300 kilometres (170–190 mi)
- DF-12/M20 – 280 kilometres (170 mi)
- DF-15 – 600–800 kilometres (370–500 mi)
- DF-2 – 1,250 kilometres (780 mi)
- DF-16 – 800–1,000 kilometres (500–620 mi)
- DF-17 – 1,800–2,500 kilometres (1,100–1,600 mi)
- DF-21 – 1,500–1,700 kilometres (930–1,060 mi) (China), (Saudi Arabia)

France

- Hadès – 480 kilometres (300 mi)
- Pluton – 120 kilometres (75 mi)
- SE.4200 – 100 kilometres (62 mi)
- SSBS S1

India

- Agni I – 700–900 kilometres (430–560 mi)
- K-15 – 750 kilometres (470 mi)
- Prahaar – 150 kilometres (93 mi)
- Pragati – 170 kilometres (110 mi) (planned)
- Pralay – 150–500 kilometres (93–311 mi)
- Pranash – 200 kilometres (120 mi) (planned)
- Prithvi I – 150 kilometres (93 mi)
- Prithvi II – 250–350 kilometres (160–220 mi)
- Prithvi III – 350–750 kilometres (220–470 mi)
- Shaurya – 700–1,900 kilometres (430–1,180 mi)
- Agni II – 2,000–3,000 kilometres (1,200–1,900 mi)
- Agni-P – 1,000–2,000 kilometres (620–1,240 mi)

Iran

- Fateh-110 – 300 kilometres (190 mi)
- Fateh-313 – 500 kilometres (310 mi)
- Fateh Mobin – 300 kilometres (190 mi)
- Naze'at – 100–130 kilometres (62–81 mi)
- Qiam 1 – 700–800 kilometres (430–500 mi)
- Ra'ad-500 – 500 kilometres (310 mi)
- Samen – 750–800 kilometres (470–500 mi)
- Shahab-1 – 350 kilometres (220 mi)
- Shahab-2 – 750 kilometres (470 mi)
- Tondar-69 – 150 kilometres (93 mi)
- Zelzal-1 – 150 kilometres (93 mi)
- Zelzal-2 – 210 kilometres (130 mi)
- Zelzal-3 – 200–250 kilometres (120–160 mi)
- Zolfaghar (missile)/Zulfiqar – 700 kilometres (430 mi)
- Ashoura – 2,000–2,500 kilometres (1,200–1,600 mi)
- Emad – 1,700 kilometres (1,100 mi)
- Fajr-3 – 2,500 kilometres (1,600 mi)(estimation)
- Ghadr-110 – 2,000–3,000 kilometres (1,200–1,900 mi)
- Khorramshahr (missile) – 2,000 kilometres (1,200 mi)
- Sejjil – 2,000–4,500 kilometres (1,200–2,800 mi)
- Shahab-3 – 1,000–2,000 kilometres (620–1,240 mi)

Iraq

- Al Abbas – 800–950 kilometres (500–590 mi)
- Al Fat'h – 160 kilometres (99 mi)
- Al Hussein – 600–650 kilometres (370–400 mi)
- Al Hijarah – 700–900 kilometres (430–560 mi)
- Al Samoud – 180 kilometres (110 mi)
- Badr-2000 – 1,000 kilometres (620 mi)

Israel

- Jericho I – 500 kilometres (310 mi)
- LORA – 300 kilometres (190 mi)
- Predator Hawk – 300 kilometres (190 mi)
- Jericho II – 1,300 kilometres (810 mi)

Nazi Germany

- Rheinbote – 160 kilometres (99 mi)
- V-2 missile – 320 kilometres (200 mi)

North Korea

- Hwasong-5 – 320 kilometres (200 mi)
- Hwasong-6 – 500 kilometres (310 mi)
- Hwasong-7 – 1,000–1,500 kilometres (620–930 mi)
- Hwasong-9 – 1,000 kilometres (620 mi)
- Hwasong-10 – 2,500–4,000 kilometres (1,600–2,500 mi)
- Hwasong-11 (KN-02) – 120–220 kilometres (75–137 mi)
- Hwasong-11S – 600 kilometres (370 mi)
- Pukguksong-1 – 500–2,000 kilometres (310–1,240 mi)
- Pukguksong-2 – 1,200–3,000 kilometres (750–1,860 mi)

Pakistan

- Abdali – 200 kilometres (120 mi)
- Ghaznavi – 290–320 kilometres (180–200 mi)
- Hatf-I – 70 kilometres (43 mi)
- Hatf-IA – 100 kilometres (62 mi)
- Hatf-IB – 100 kilometres (62 mi)
- Nasr – 70–90 kilometres (43–56 mi)
- Shaheen – 750 kilometres (470 mi)
- Shaheen-1 – 900 kilometres (560 mi)
- Shaheen-1 A – 1,000 kilometres (620 mi)
- Ababeel – 2,200 kilometres (1,400 mi)
- Ghauri-I – 1,500 kilometres (930 mi)
- Ghauri-II – 1,800–2,000 kilometres (1,100–1,200 mi)
- Ghauri-III – 3,000–3,500 kilometres (1,900–2,200 mi) (Cancelled)
- Shaheen-II – 2,500 kilometres (1,600 mi)
- Shaheen-III – 2,750 kilometres (1,710 mi)

Serbia

- Šumadija (multiple rocket launcher) – 75–285 kilometres (47–177 mi)

South Korea

- Hyunmoo-1 – 180 kilometres (110 mi)
- Hyunmoo-2A – 300 kilometres (190 mi)
- Hyunmoo-2B – 500 kilometres (310 mi)
- Hyunmoo-2C – 800 kilometres (500 mi)
- Hyunmoo-4 – 800 kilometres (500 mi)
- Hyunmoo IV-4 – 500 kilometres (310 mi)
- KTSSM – 180–290 kilometres (110–180 mi)

Soviet Union/Russia

- 9K720 Iskander-M – 400–500 kilometres (250–310 mi) Russia
- OTR-21 Tochka-U – 70–185 kilometres (43–115 mi) Soviet Union/Russia
- OTR-23 Oka – 500 kilometres (310 mi) Soviet Union/Russia
- R-1 – 270 kilometres (170 mi)
- R-2 – 600–1,200 kilometres (370–750 mi) Soviet Union
- Scud A-D – 180–700 kilometres (110–430 mi) Soviet Union
- TR-1 Temp – 900 kilometres (560 mi) Soviet Union
- R-5 Pobeda – 1,200 kilometres (750 mi) Soviet Union
- R-12 Dvina – 2,080 kilometres (1,290 mi) Soviet Union
- RT-15 – 2,500 kilometres (1,600 mi) Soviet Union

Taiwan

- Sky Spear – 300 kilometres (190 mi)
- Sky Horse – 600–950 kilometres (370–590 mi)
- Strong Bow II – 1,500 kilometres (930 mi)

Turkey

- BORA I – 280 kilometres (170 mi)
- BORA II – 360 kilometres (220 mi)
- J-600T Yıldırım I – 150 kilometres (93 mi)
- J-600T Yıldırım II – 300 kilometres (190 mi)
- J-600T Yıldırım III – 900 kilometres (560 mi)

Ukraine

- Hrim-2 50–500 kilometres (31–311 mi)

United Kingdom

- Nightfall (missile) – over 500 kilometres (310 mi)

United States

- Long-Range Hypersonic Weapon – over 2,775 kilometres (1,724 mi)
- MGM-18 Lacrosse – 19 kilometres (12 mi)
- MGM-31 Pershing – 740 kilometres (460 mi)
- MGM-52 Lance – 70–120 kilometres (43–75 mi)
- MGM-140 ATACMS – 128–300 kilometres (80–186 mi)
- OpFires – 1,609 kilometres (1,000 mi)?
- PGM-11 Redstone – 92–323 kilometres (57–201 mi)
- Precision Strike Missile – 499 kilometres (310 mi)
- Pershing II – 1,770 kilometres (1,100 mi)
- PGM-19 Jupiter – 2,400 kilometres (1,500 mi)

Yemen

- Burkan-1 (modified Scud) – 800 kilometres (500 mi) (Houthis)
- Burkan-2 (modified Scud) (Houthis) –
- Qaher-1 (modified S-75 Dvina) – 300 kilometres (190 mi) (Houthis)
- Qaher-M2 – 400 kilometres (250 mi) (Houthis)

== See also ==
- List of missiles
