= Turkey and weapons of mass destruction =

Republic of Türkiye
- Nuclear weapons stationing start date: 1959; 67 years ago
- Nuclear weapons stationing provider: United States
- Current nuclear weapons stationed: 20–30 warheads

The United States has stationed nuclear weapons in Turkey since 1959. As of 2023, an estimated 20 to 30 B61 nuclear bombs were stored at Incirlik Air Base under the command and control of the United States Air Force (USAF).

Responding to the Iranian nuclear program, Turkey has publicly expressed similar ambitions to those of Saudi Arabia. In 2019, Turkish President Recep Tayyip Erdoğan questioned Turkey's signature on the Non-Proliferation Treaty and implicitly declared his administration's agenda of acquiring a nuclear weapon.

On 9 February 2026, Turkish Foreign Minister Hakan Fidan warned that "if Iran succeed in nuclear weapons development, it could trigger a regional nuclear arms race in the Middle East", which was also echoed by the Turkish government-aligned newspaper, Yeni Şafak.

== Nuclear weapons ==
=== US nuclear weapons in Turkey ===
During the 1962 Cuban Missile Crisis, a key issue for the Soviet side was the 1961 stationing of PGM-19 Jupiter intermediate-range ballistic missiles in the NATO countries of Turkey as well as Italy. As part of the crisis resolution, the United States secretly agreed to remove them from Turkey, under a US military operation known as Operation Pot Pie II.

Following the end of the Cold War in 1991, US weapons were removed from Erhac Air Base and Eskişehir Air Base. In 1995, weapons were removed from Akinci Air Base and Balikesir Air Base, although the nuclear weapons storage vaults at these bases remain on "caretaker status". Since 1995, the only US nuclear weapons in Turkey have been stored at Incirlik Air Base. As of 2023, an estimated 20 to 30 B61 nuclear bombs were stored there. In the event of a crisis, these weapons would require airlifting to a United States-operated airbase, or emergency delivery by Turkish Air Force F-16C/D fighter jets.

During the presidency of Recep Tayyip Erdoğan, including the 2016 Turkish coup attempt and Turkish involvement in the Syrian civil war, US officials internally debated removing all nuclear weapons from Turkey.

=== Aspirations and alleged pursuits for nuclear weapons ===
In September 2019, while speaking at the Central Anatolian Economic Forum, President Recep Tayyip Erdoğan said: "Some people have nuclear-tipped missiles, not just one or two... But I shouldn't have nuclear-tipped missiles! I don't accept this." He added: "Currently, there is almost no developed country in the world that doesn't possess nuclear warheads; they all have them. I won't name names, but one of them, who is not currently a president, told me when I visited him, "They say this and that about us, but I currently have around 7,500 nuclear warheads... I'm going to build some too." "Now look at the situation, where are they, what kind of competition are they engaged in, and what are they telling us? 'Don't you dare do that [acquire nuclear weapons],' they say. Israel is right next to us. Is it there? Yes, it is. And it's using everything it has to intimidate us. My dear brothers and sisters, we are currently carrying out our work on this matter."

In 2026, high level Turkish officials have made several comments suggesting Turkey would try to acquire nuclear weapons if Iran did. Similar to Erdoğan, Turkish Foreign Minister Hakan Fidan also made significant statements on this matter. On 9 February 2026, Fidan addressed his country's nuclear policy signalling what was described as a potential shift in Turkey’s stance. During the interview, Fidan criticised the "unjust" structure of the NPT regime, noting that it permits only the five permanent members of the UN Security Council to possess nuclear weapons while obliging them to pursue disarmament and share peaceful nuclear technology with non-nuclear states - commitments he argued have not been fulfilled. Describing the situation as "nuclear injustice" Fidan also declined to directly answer whether Turkey should possess nuclear weapons. His silence was interpreted by some commentators as signalling a strategic ambiguity similar to the policy of “nuclear opacity” suggesting that Turkey may be positioning itself as a potential “threshold state” in the global nuclear order.

On 25 February 2026, Yeni Şafak, a daily newspaper closely associated with President Recep Tayyip Erdoğan, published a front-page article titled "Nuclear Weapons Are Forbidden Only to Muslims", arguing that the West applies nuclear rules selectively, legitimising its own dominance while denying similar capabilities to Muslim-majority states, stating that "this asymmetric structure targeted the Islamic world." The article, published during the Iran–United States negotiations, cited North Korea as evidence that nuclear weapons provided regime security, avoiding direct intervention despite sanctions, and described Ukraine's relinquishment of its arsenal as proof that nuclear capability was necessary for survival. The piece concluded that in a world "where everyone was on the menu," nuclear weapons were a necessity for sovereignty, deterrence, and survival, and urged the Islamic world to take "every critical step" to confront Western "imperialist states" and protect its interests.

== Chemical weapons ==
Turkey signed the Chemical Weapons Convention in 1993 and ratified it in 1997.

== Biological weapons ==
Turkey signed the Biological Weapons Convention in 1972 and ratified it in 1974.

== Delivery systems ==
In May 2026, Turkey unveiled a prototype of the Yıldırımhan, which would be the country's first domestically developed intercontinental ballistic missile (ICBM), with an estimated range of 6,000 kilometers. A model was publicly displayed at the SAHA 2026 Defence and Aerospace Exhibition in Istanbul.

The Yıldırımhan represents a significant expansion of Turkish missile capabilities beyond earlier systems such as the J-600T Yıldırım, Bora, Tayfun, and Cenk missiles.
