= List of states with nuclear weapons =

Map of states with nuclear weapons by status in the Non-Proliferation Treaty (NPT) in 2025: Party to NPT and declared possession of nuclear weapons (China, France, Russia, United Kingdom, United States) Non-party to NPT and declared possession of nuclear weapons (India, North Korea, Pakistan) Non-party to NPT and non-declared possession of nuclear weapons (Israel) No state-developed nuclear weapons, but hosting nuclear weapons of Russia (Belarus) or of the United States (Belgium, Germany, Italy, Netherlands, Turkey) Former possession of nuclear weapons (Kazakhstan, South Africa, Ukraine)

There are nine sovereign states that are generally understood to possess nuclear weapons, though only eight formally acknowledge possessing them. In order of first successful nuclear test, the world's nine nuclear-armed states are the United States (1945), Russia (1949), the United Kingdom (1952), France (1960), China (1964), India (1974), Pakistan (1998), and North Korea (2006); Israel is believed to have acquired nuclear weapons around 1967, but has never openly tested or formally acknowledged having them. Under the Non-Proliferation Treaty (NPT), the United States, Russia, the United Kingdom, France, and China are recognized "nuclear-weapons states" (NWS). They are also the five permanent members of the United Nations Security Council. Israel, India, and Pakistan never signed the NPT, while North Korea acceded to it in 1985 before announcing withdrawal in 2003. (Note: There are differing views over whether North Korea's withdrawal proceedings were valid under the treaty, and its status in relation to the treaty.)

South Africa developed nuclear weapons by 1982 but dismantled them around 1989 and joined the NPT in 1991. Following the dissolution of the Soviet Union in 1991, the former Soviet republics of Ukraine, Kazakhstan, and Belarus had nuclear weapons deployed on their territories, but agreed to transfer them to Russia (which inherited the Soviet Union's international rights and obligations) and join the NPT as non-nuclear-weapon states.

There are six states that do not possess nuclear weapons, but have nuclear weapons deployed on their territory. U.S. nuclear weapons are based in Belgium, Germany, Italy, the Netherlands, and Turkey. Russian nuclear weapons are deployed in Belarus. During the Cold War, at least 23 states were known hosts of U.S., British, or Soviet nuclear weapons.

According to the Federation of American Scientists (FAS), there are 12,187 nuclear warheads in the world and approximately 3,912 of these are active, as of 2026. In 2024, the Stockholm International Peace Research Institute (SIPRI) estimated that the total number of nuclear warheads had reached 12,121. Approximately 9,585 nuclear warheads are kept with military stockpiles. About 3,904 warheads are deployed with operational forces. 2,100 warheads, which are primarily from Russia and the United States, are maintained for high operational alerts.

== Statistics and force configuration ==
The following is a list of states that have acknowledged the possession of nuclear weapons or are presumed to possess them, the approximate number of warheads under their control, and the year they tested their first weapon and their force configuration. This list is informally known in global politics as the "Nuclear Club". With the exception of Russia and the United States (which have subjected their nuclear forces to independent verification under various treaties) these figures are estimates, in some cases quite unreliable estimates. In particular, under the Strategic Offensive Reductions Treaty thousands of Russian and US nuclear warheads are inactive in stockpiles awaiting processing. The fissile material contained in the warheads can then be recycled for use in nuclear reactors.

From a high of 70,300 active weapons in 1986, as of 2026 there are approximately 3,912 active nuclear warheads and 12,187 total nuclear warheads in the world. Many of the decommissioned weapons were simply stored or partially dismantled, not destroyed.

Additionally, since the dawn of the Atomic Age, the delivery methods of most states with nuclear weapons have evolved—with five acquiring a nuclear triad, while others have consolidated away from land and air deterrents to submarine-based forces.

Overview of nuclear states and their capacities
Country	Warheads (Note: Estimates from the Federation of American Scientists. The latest update was in January 2023. "Deployed" indicates the total of deployed strategic and non-strategic warheads. Because the number of non-strategic warheads is unknown for many countries, this number should be taken as a minimum. When a range of weapons is given (e.g., 0–10), it generally indicates that the estimate is being made on the amount of fissile material that has likely been produced, and the amount of fissile material needed per warhead depends on estimates of a country's proficiency at nuclear weapon design.)		First test		Thermo-nuclear power?	NPT status	CTBT status	Delivery method				Tests
Country	Total	Deployed	Date	Site	Thermo-nuclear power?	NPT status	CTBT status	Sea	Air	Land	Notes	Tests
United States	3,700	1,670	16 July 1945 (Trinity)	Alamogordo, New Mexico		Party	Signatory				US triad	1,030
Russian Federation	4,400	1,796	29 August 1949 (RDS-1) (Note: As a part of the Soviet Union. The Russian Federation has not tested a nuclear weapon since 1991.)	Semipalatinsk, Kazakh SSR		Party	Signatory (ratified, but later revoked ratification)				Russian triad	715
United Kingdom	225	120	3 October 1952 (Hurricane)	Monte Bello Islands, Australia		Party	Ratifier				Trident submarines (Note: See also UK Trident programme. From the 1960s until the 1990s, the United Kingdom's Royal Air Force maintained the independent capability to deliver nuclear weapons via its V bomber fleet.)	45
France	290	280	13 February 1960 (Gerboise Bleue)	Reggane, French Algeria		Party	Ratifier				Triomphant submarines, air capability (Note: See also Force de dissuasion. France formerly possessed a nuclear triad until 1996, when its land-based arsenal was retired.)	210
China	620	34	16 October 1964 (596)	Lop Nur, Xinjiang		Party	Signatory				Chinese triad	45
India	190	12	18 May 1974 (Smiling Buddha)	Pokhran, Rajasthan		Non-party	Non-signatory				Indian triad	6
Pakistan	170	0	28 May 1998 (Chagai-1)	Ras Koh Hills, Balochistan		Non-party	Non-signatory				Pakistani triad	2
Israel	90	0	1960–1979 (Note: Data include the suspected Vela incident of 22 September 1979.)	Unknown		Non-party	Signatory				Suspected Israeli triad	1? (unconfirmed)
North Korea	60	0	9 October 2006	Kilju, North Hamgyong		Announced withdrawal	Non-signatory				North Korean delivery systems	6

=== Nuclear forces comparison ===
This table uses the following identifiers:

- — This country has a nuclear mission assigned to this delivery system.
- — This country has never had a nuclear mission assigned to this delivery system.
- — It is unclear if this country has a nuclear mission assigned to this delivery system.
- — This country is developing this delivery system with a nuclear mission envisioned.
- — This country previously assigned a nuclear mission to this delivery system.

Estimated nuclear weapons delivery systems by country, 2026 (Note: Many countries formerly operated a wider range of strategic and especially tactical systems, especially during the Cold War. While most of these are no longer operational, Russia is the only country as of 2025 believed to operate nuclear-armed anti-ballistic missiles, surface-to-air missiles, anti-ship missiles anti-submarine weapons, depth bombs, and torpedoes.)
Reference										
Basing	Type	(United States)	(Russia)	(United Kingdom)	(France)	(China)	(Israel)	(India)	(Pakistan)	(North Korea)
Land	Intercontinental ballistic missile									
Land	Intermediate-range ballistic missile									
Land	Medium-range ballistic missile									
Land	Short-range ballistic missile									
Land	Tactical ballistic missile									
Land	Ground-launched cruise missile									
Sea	Sea-launched ballistic missile									
Sea	Sea-launched cruise missile									
Air	Air-launched ballistic missile									
Air	Air-launched cruise missile									
Air	Gravity bomb									
Depth bomb										

Percentage of global nuclear warheads by country
1. Russia (45.1%)
2. United States (38.0%)
3. China (6.36%)
4. France (2.98%)
5. United Kingdom (2.31%)
6. India (1.95%)
7. Pakistan (1.74%)
8. Israel (0.92%)
9. North Korea (0.62%)

== Recognized nuclear-weapon states ==
These five states are known to have detonated a nuclear explosive before 1 January 1967 and are thus nuclear weapons states under the Treaty on the Non-Proliferation of Nuclear Weapons. They also happen to be the UN Security Council's (UNSC) permanent members with veto power on UNSC resolutions.

=== United States ===
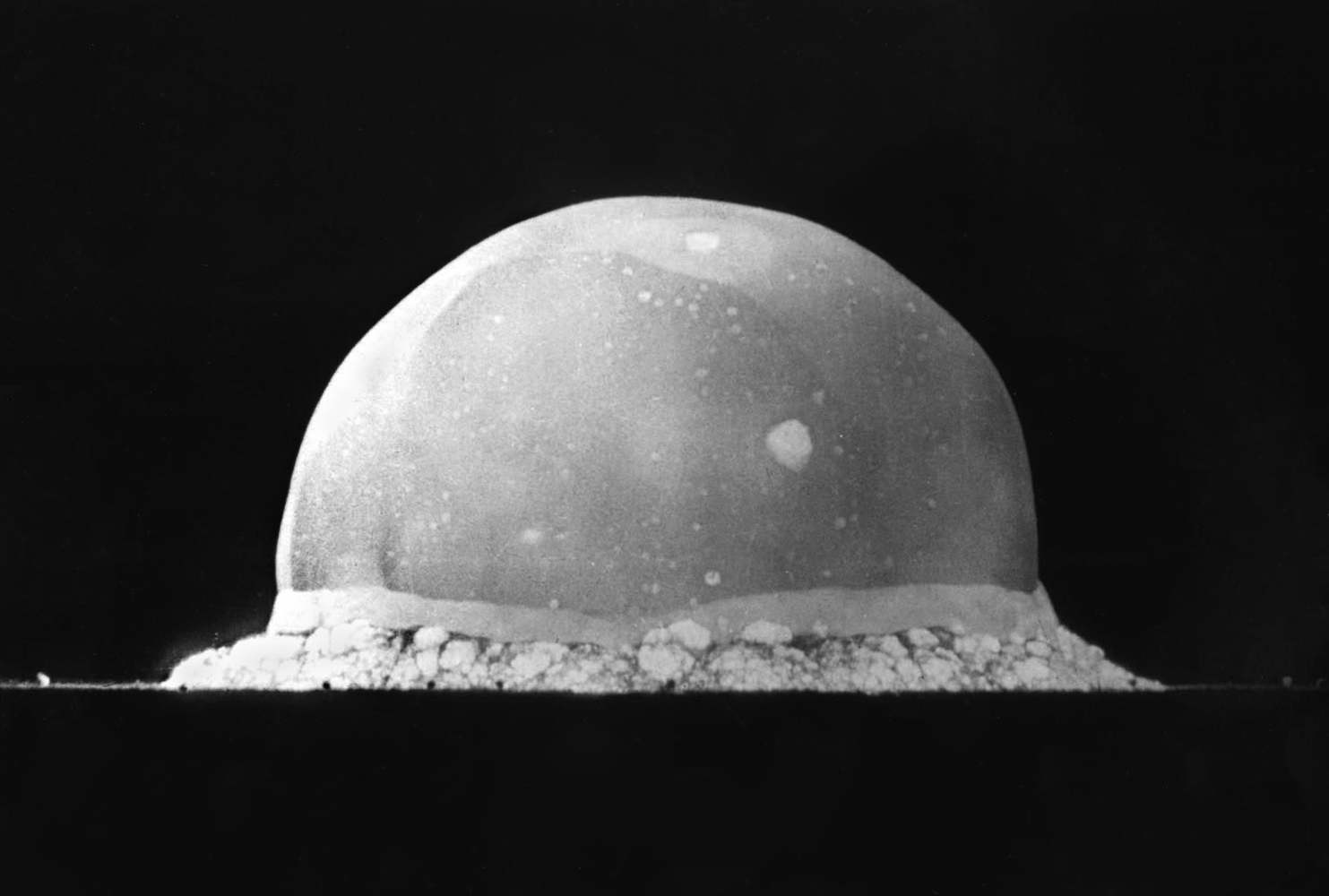
An early stage in the "Trinity" fireball, the first man-made nuclear explosion, 1945

The United States developed the first nuclear weapons during World War II in cooperation with the United Kingdom and Canada as part of the Manhattan Project, out of the apprehension that Nazi Germany would develop them first. It tested the first nuclear weapon on 16 July 1945 ("Trinity") at 5:30 am, and remains the only country to have used nuclear weapons in war, having bombed the Japanese cities of Hiroshima and Nagasaki in the closing stages of World War II. The project expenditure through 1 October 1945 was reportedly $1.845–$2 billion, in nominal terms, roughly 0.8 percent of the US GDP in 1945 and equivalent to about $34.4 billion today.

The United States was the first nation to develop the hydrogen bomb, testing an experimental prototype in 1952 ("Ivy Mike") and a deployable weapon in 1954 ("Castle Bravo"). Throughout the Cold War it continued to modernize and enlarge its nuclear arsenal, but from 1992 on has been involved primarily in a program of stockpile stewardship. The US nuclear arsenal contained 31,175 warheads at its Cold War height (in 1966). During the Cold War, the United States built more nuclear weapons than all other nations at approximately 70,000 warheads.

=== Russia (successor to the Soviet Union) ===
US and USSR/Russian nuclear weapons stockpiles, 1945–2014

The Soviet Union tested its first nuclear weapon ("RDS-1") in 1949. This crash project was developed partially with information obtained via the atomic spies at the United States' Manhattan Project during and after World War II. The Soviet Union was the second nation to have developed and tested a nuclear weapon. It tested its first megaton-range hydrogen bomb ("RDS-37") in 1955. The Soviet Union also tested the most powerful explosive ever detonated by humans, ("Tsar Bomba"), with a theoretical yield of 100 megatons, reduced to 50 when detonated. After its dissolution in 1991, the Soviet weapons entered officially into the possession of its successor state, the Russian Federation. The Soviet nuclear arsenal contained some 45,000 warheads at its peak (in 1986), more than any other nation had possessed at any point in history; the Soviet Union built about 55,000 nuclear warheads since 1949.

=== United Kingdom ===
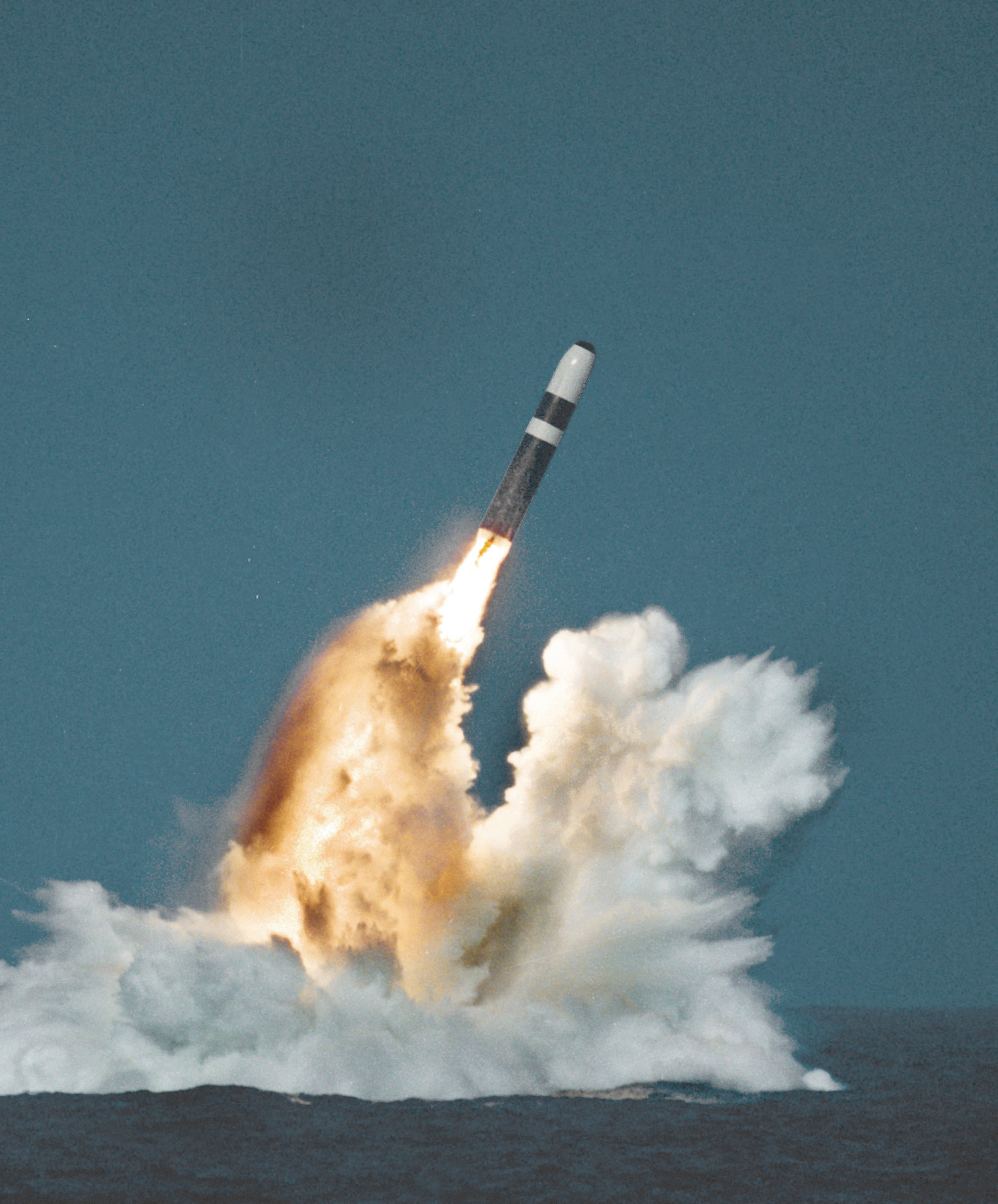
A Trident missile launched from a Royal Navy Vanguard-class ballistic missile submarine

The United Kingdom tested its first nuclear weapon ("Hurricane") in 1952. The UK had provided considerable impetus and initial research for the early conception of the atomic bomb, aided by Austrian, German and Polish physicists working at British universities who had either fled or decided not to return to Nazi Germany or Nazi-controlled territories. The UK collaborated closely with the United States and Canada during the Manhattan Project, but had to develop its own method for manufacturing and detonating a bomb as US secrecy grew after 1945. The United Kingdom was the third country in the world, after the United States and the Soviet Union, to develop and test a nuclear weapon. Its programme was motivated to have an independent deterrent against the Soviet Union, while also maintaining its status as a great power. It tested its first hydrogen bomb in 1957 (Operation Grapple), making it the third country to do so after the United States and Soviet Union.

The British Armed Forces maintained a fleet of V bomber strategic bombers and ballistic missile submarines (SSBNs) equipped with nuclear weapons during the Cold War. The Royal Navy maintains a fleet of four Vanguard-class ballistic missile submarines equipped with Trident II missiles. In 2016, the UK House of Commons voted to renew the British nuclear weapons system with the Dreadnought-class submarine, without setting a date for the commencement of service of a replacement to the existing system.

At the 2025 NATO summit, the UK announced it would purchase 12 US-made F-35A jets which are expected to carry US-made atomic bombs—expanding UK nuclear capability to include airborne delivery systems.

=== France ===
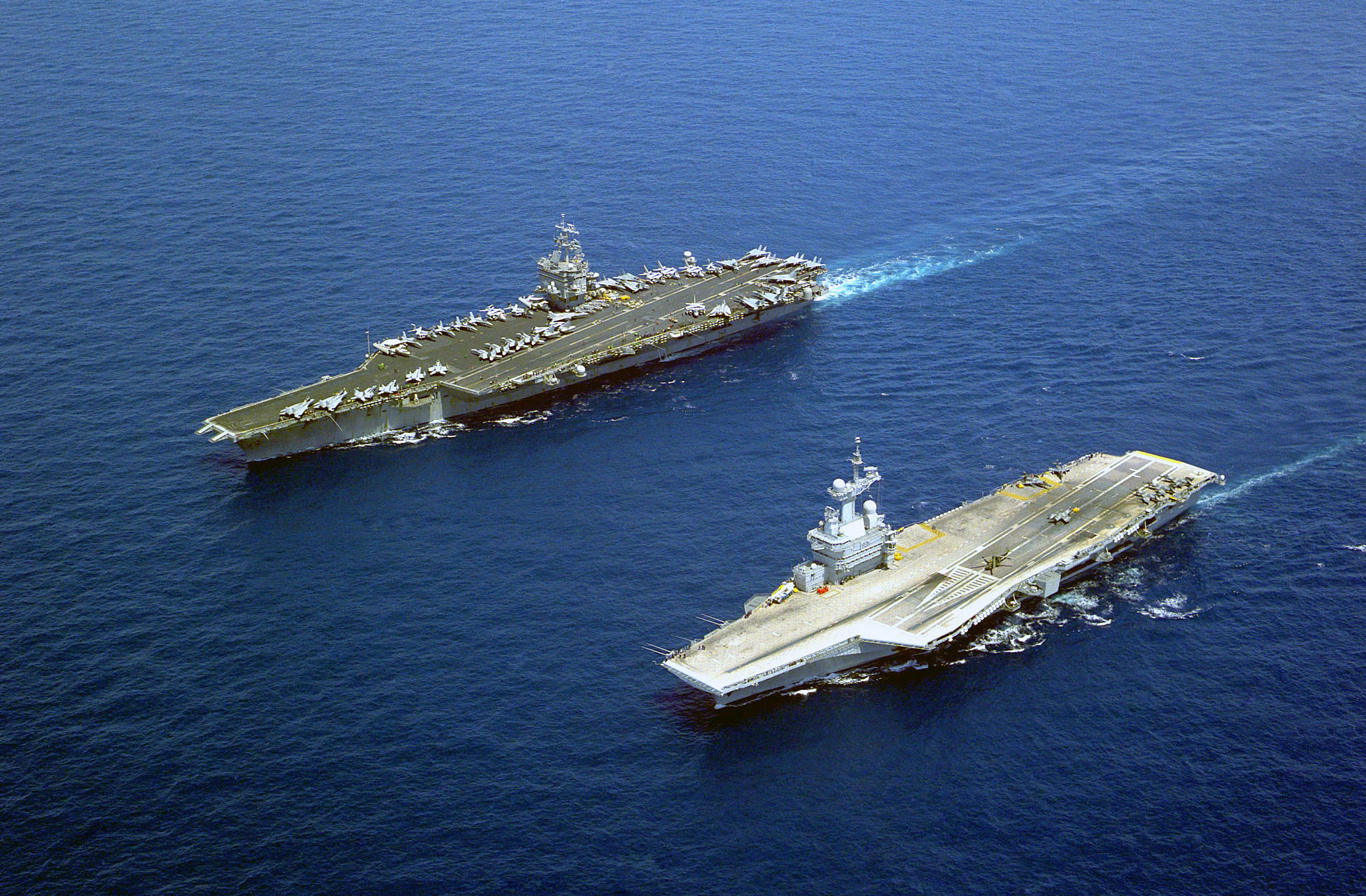
American nuclear-powered carrier USS Enterprise (left) and French nuclear-powered aircraft carrier Charles de Gaulle (right), each of which carries nuclear-capable warplanes

France tested its first nuclear weapon in 1960 ("Gerboise Bleue"), based mostly on its own research. It was motivated by the Suez Crisis diplomatic tension in relation to both the Soviet Union and its allies, the United States and United Kingdom. It was also relevant to retain great power status, alongside the United Kingdom, during the post-colonial Cold War (see: Force de frappe). France tested its first hydrogen bomb in 1968 ("Opération Canopus"). After the Cold War, France has disarmed 175 warheads with the reduction and modernization of its arsenal that has now evolved to a dual system based on submarine-launched ballistic missiles (SLBMs) and medium-range air-to-surface missiles (Rafale fighter-bombers). However, new nuclear weapons are in development and reformed nuclear squadrons were trained during Enduring Freedom operations in Afghanistan.

France acceded to the Nuclear Non-Proliferation Treaty in 1992. In January 2006, President Jacques Chirac stated a terrorist act or the use of weapons of mass destruction against France would result in a nuclear counterattack. In February 2015, President François Hollande stressed the need for a nuclear deterrent in "a dangerous world". He also detailed the French deterrent as "fewer than 300" nuclear warheads, three sets of 16 submarine-launched ballistic missiles and 54 medium-range air-to-surface missiles and urged other states to show similar transparency.

=== China ===
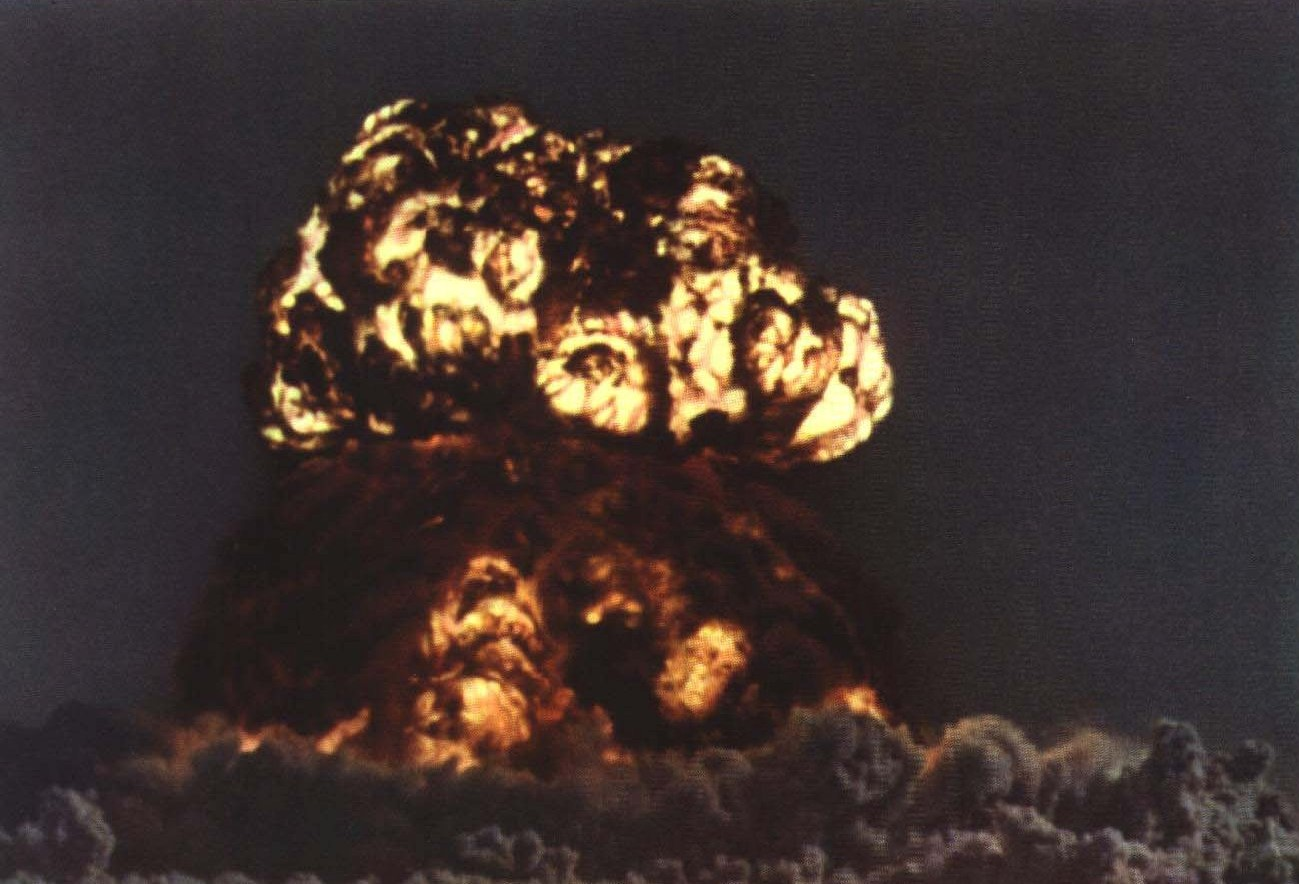
Mushroom cloud from China's first nuclear test, Project 596

China tested its first nuclear weapon device ("596") in 1964 at the Lop Nur test site. The weapon was developed as a deterrent against both the United States and the Soviet Union. Two years later, China had a fission bomb capable of being put onto a nuclear missile. It tested its first hydrogen bomb ("Test No. 6") in 1967, 32 months after testing its first nuclear weapon (the shortest fission-to-fusion development known in history). China is the only NPT nuclear-weapon state to give an unqualified negative security assurance with its "no first use" policy. China acceded to the Nuclear Non-Proliferation Treaty in 1992. As of 2016, China fielded SLBMs onboard its JL-2 submarines. As of February 2024, China had an estimated total inventory of approximately 500 warheads.

According to Stockholm International Peace Research Institute (SIPRI), China is in the middle of a significant modernization and expansion of its nuclear arsenal. Its nuclear stockpile is expected to continue growing over the coming decade and some projections suggest that it will deploy at least as many intercontinental ballistic missiles (ICBMs) as either Russia or the US in that period. However, China's overall nuclear warhead stockpile is still expected to remain smaller than that of either of those states. The Yearbook published by SIPRI in 2024 revealed that China's nuclear warheads stockpile increased by 90 in 2023, reaching 500 warheads.

US Department of Defense officials estimate that China had more than 600 operational nuclear warheads as of December 2024, and it was on track to possess 1,000 nuclear weapons by the year 2030.

== States declaring possession of nuclear weapons ==
=== India ===
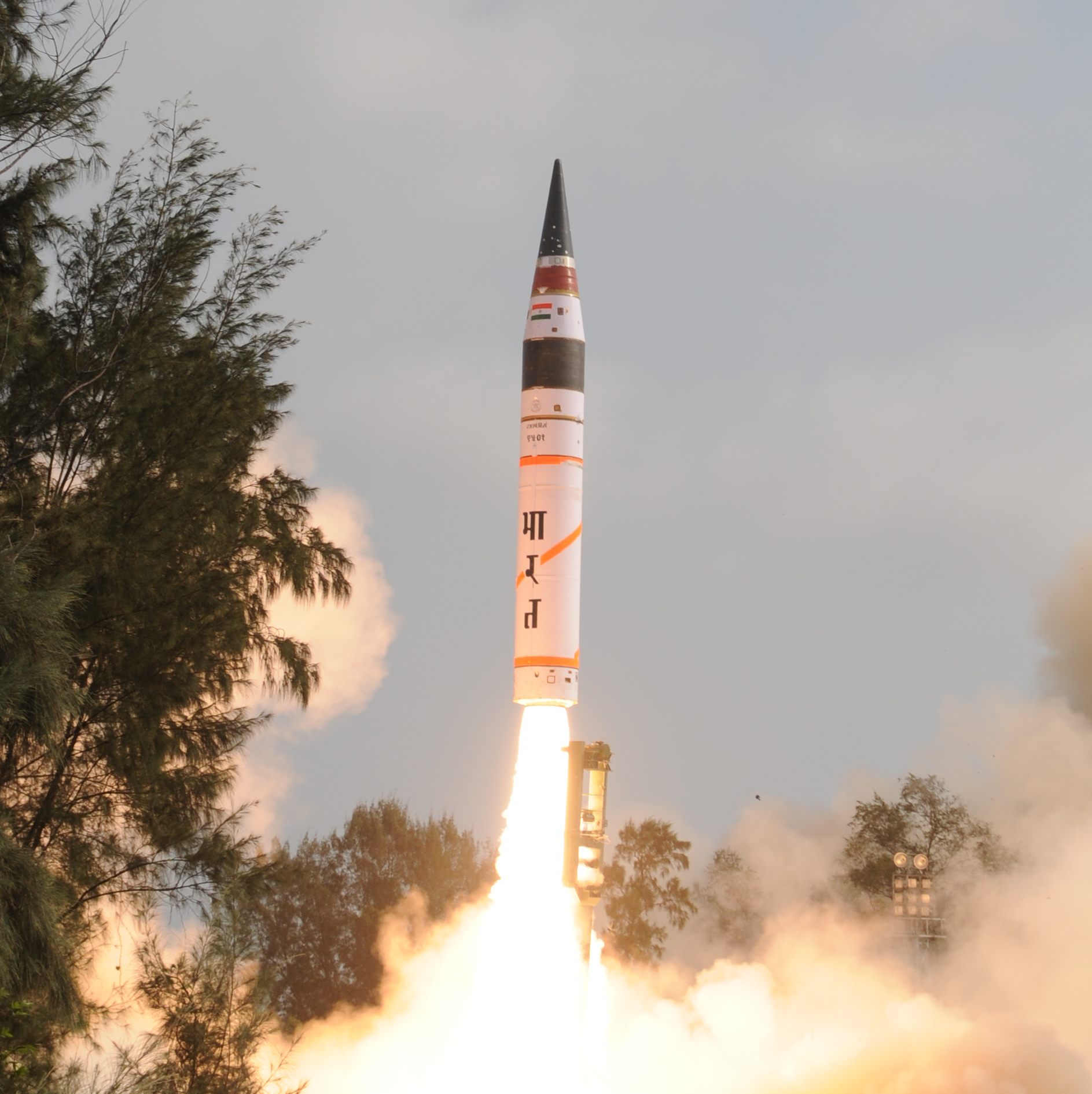
Agni-V during its first test flight on 19 April 2012

India is not a party to the Nuclear Non-Proliferation Treaty. Indian officials rejected the NPT in the 1960s on the grounds that it created a world of nuclear "haves" and "have-nots", arguing that it unnecessarily restricted "peaceful activity" (including "peaceful nuclear explosives"), and that India would not accede to international control of their nuclear facilities unless all other countries engaged in unilateral disarmament of their own nuclear weapons. The Indian position has also asserted that the NPT is in many ways a neo-colonial regime designed to deny security to post-colonial powers.

The country tested what is called a "peaceful nuclear explosive" in 1974 (which became known as "Smiling Buddha"). The test was the first test developed after the creation of the NPT, and created new questions about how civilian nuclear technology could be diverted secretly to weapons purposes (dual-use technology). India's secret development caused great concern and anger particularly from nations that had supplied its nuclear reactors for peaceful and power generating needs, such as Canada. After its 1974 test, India maintained that its nuclear capability was primarily "peaceful", but between 1988 and 1990 it apparently weaponized two dozen nuclear weapons for delivery by air. In 1998 India tested weaponized nuclear warheads ("Operation Shakti"), including a thermonuclear device, and declared itself as a nuclear state. India adopted a "no first use" policy in 1998.

In July 2005, US president George W. Bush and Indian prime minister Manmohan Singh announced a civil nuclear cooperation initiative that included plans to conclude an Indo-US civilian nuclear agreement. This initiative came to fruition through a series of steps that included India's announced plan to separate its civil and military nuclear programs in March 2006, the passage of the India–United States Civil Nuclear Agreement by the US Congress in December 2006, the conclusion of a US–India nuclear cooperation agreement in July 2007, approval by the IAEA of an India-specific safeguards agreement, agreement by the Nuclear Suppliers Group to a waiver of export restrictions for India, approval by the US Congress and culminating in the signature of US–India agreement for civil nuclear cooperation in October 2008. The US State Department said it made it "very clear that we will not recognize India as a nuclear-weapon state". The United States is bound by the Hyde Act with India and may cease all cooperation with India if India detonates a nuclear explosive device. The US had further said it is not its intention to assist India in the design, construction or operation of sensitive nuclear technologies through the transfer of dual-use items. In establishing an exemption for India, the Nuclear Suppliers Group reserved the right to consult on any future issues which might trouble it. As of April 2026, India was estimated to have a stockpile of 190 warheads.

=== Pakistan ===
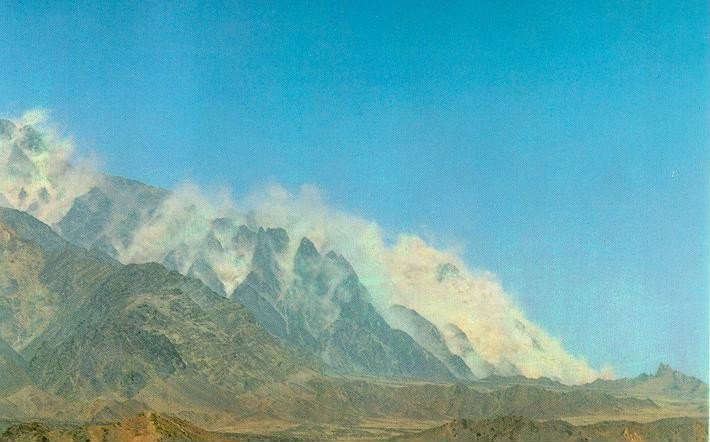
Debris erupts from a mountain during an underground nuclear weapon detonation carried out as part of Pakistan's Chaghai-I series of tests.

Pakistan is also not a party to the Nuclear Non-Proliferation Treaty. Pakistan covertly developed nuclear weapons over decades, beginning in the late 1970s. Pakistan first delved into nuclear power after the establishment of its first nuclear power plant near Karachi with equipment and materials supplied mainly by western nations in the early 1970s. Pakistani prime minister Zulfiqar Ali Bhutto promised in 1971 that if India could build nuclear weapons then Pakistan would too, according to him: "We will develop Nuclear stockpiles, even if we have to eat grass."

It is believed that Pakistan has possessed nuclear weapons since the mid-1980s. The United States continued to certify that Pakistan did not possess such weapons until 1990, when sanctions were imposed under the Pressler Amendment, requiring a cutoff of US economic and military assistance to Pakistan. In 1998, Pakistan conducted its first six nuclear tests at the Ras Koh Hills in response to the five tests conducted by India a few weeks before.

In 2004, the Pakistani metallurgist Abdul Qadeer Khan, a key figure in Pakistan's nuclear weapons program, confessed to heading an international black market ring involved in selling nuclear weapons technology. In particular, Khan had been selling gas centrifuge technology to North Korea, Iran, and Libya. Khan denied complicity by the Pakistani government or Army, but this has been called into question by journalists and IAEA officials, and was later contradicted by statements from Khan himself.

As of early 2013, Pakistan was estimated to have had a stockpile of around 140 warheads, and in November 2014 it was projected that by 2020 Pakistan would have enough fissile material for 200 warheads. As of 2024, SIPRI estimated that Pakistan had a stockpile of around 170 warheads.

On 27 April 2025, in response to India's declared suspension of the Indus Waters Treaty in retaliation for the 2025 Pahalgam attack, Hanif Abbasi, the Pakistani minister of railways warned that any attempt to cut off Pakistan's water supply could lead to full-scale war and stated Pakistan's nuclear stockpile of 130 warheads was aimed towards India.

=== North Korea ===
North Korea was a party to the Nuclear Non-Proliferation Treaty, but announced a withdrawal on 10 January 2003, after the United States accused it of having a secret uranium enrichment program and cut off energy assistance under the 1994 Agreed Framework. In February 2005, North Korea claimed to possess functional nuclear weapons, though their lack of a test at the time led many experts to doubt the claim. In October 2006, North Korea stated that, in response to growing intimidation by the United States, it would conduct a nuclear test to confirm its nuclear status. North Korea reported a successful nuclear test on 9 October 2006 (see 2006 North Korean nuclear test). Most US intelligence officials believed that the test was probably only partially successful with a yield of less than a kiloton. North Korea conducted a second, higher-yield test on 25 May 2009 (see 2009 North Korean nuclear test) and a third test with still-higher yield on 12 February 2013 (see 2013 North Korean nuclear test).

North Korea claimed to have conducted its first hydrogen-bomb test on 5 January 2016, though measurements of seismic disturbances indicate that the detonation was not consistent with a hydrogen bomb. On 3 September 2017, North Korea detonated a device, which caused a magnitude 6.1 tremor, consistent with a low-powered thermonuclear detonation; NORSAR estimates the yield at 250 kilotons of TNT. In 2018, North Korea announced a halt in nuclear weapons tests and made a conditional commitment to denuclearisation of the Korean Peninsula; however, in December 2019, it indicated it no longer considered itself bound by the moratorium.

Kim Jong Un officially declared North Korea a nuclear weapons state during a speech on 9 September 2022, the country's foundation day.

According to the Stockholm International Peace Research Institute (SIPRI), North Korea's military nuclear programme remains central to its national security strategy and it may have assembled up to 30 nuclear weapons and could produce more. North Korea conducted more than 90 ballistic missile tests during 2022, the highest number it has ever undertaken in a single year.

== States believed to possess nuclear weapons ==
=== Israel ===
Israel is generally understood to have been the sixth country to develop nuclear weapons, but does not acknowledge it. It had "rudimentary, but deliverable," nuclear weapons available as early as 1966. Israel is not a party to the NPT. Israel engages in strategic ambiguity, saying it would not be the first country to "introduce" nuclear weapons to the Middle East without confirming or denying that it has a nuclear weapons program or arsenal. This policy of "nuclear opacity" has been interpreted as an attempt to get the benefits of deterrence with a minimal political cost. As of 2006, some analysts believe that, due to a US ban on funding countries that proliferate weapons of mass destruction, Israel could lose around $2 billion a year in military and other aid from the US if it admitted to possessing nuclear weapons.

According to the Natural Resources Defense Council and the Federation of American Scientists, Israel likely possesses around 80–400 nuclear weapons. Former US president Jimmy Carter stated in 2008 that Israel has over 150 nuclear weapons. The Stockholm International Peace Research Institute estimates that Israel has approximately 90 intact nuclear weapons, of which 50 are thought to be assigned for delivery by land-based Jericho ballistic missiles and 30 are gravity bombs for delivery by F-16I or F-15 aircraft. SIPRI also reports that Israel operates five German-built Dolphin-class (Dolphin-I and Dolphin-II) diesel–electric submarines. The submarines are based at Haifa on the Mediterranean coast. There are unconfirmed reports that all or some of the submarines have been equipped to launch an indigenously produced nuclear-armed sea-launched variant of the Popeye cruise missile, giving Israel a sea-based nuclear strike capability.

On 7 November 2023, during the Gaza war, Heritage Minister Amihai Eliyahu said during a radio interview that a nuclear strike would be "one way" to deal with Gaza, which commentators and diplomats interpreted as a tacit admission that Israel possesses such a capability. His remarks were criticized by the United States and Russia, and Eliyahu was subsequently suspended from the Israeli cabinet.

== Launch authority ==
The decision to use nuclear weapons is always restricted to a single person or small group of people. The United States and France require their respective presidents to approve the use of nuclear weapons. In the US, the Presidential Emergency Satchel is always handled by a nearby aide unless the president is near a command center. The decision rests with the prime minister in the United Kingdom. In the People's Republic of China, launch authority rests with the Chairman of the Central Military Commission of the Chinese Communist Party under its principle of "the Party commands the gun." Russia grants such power to the president but may also require approval from the minister of defence and the chief of the General Staff. The supreme commander of the Armed Forces has authority in North Korea. India, Pakistan and Israel have committees for such a decision.

Some countries are known to have delegated launch authority to military personnel in the event that the usual launch authority is incapacitated; whether or not the 'pre-delegated' authority exists at any particular time is kept secret. In the United States, some military commanders have been delegated authority to launch nuclear weapons "when the urgency of time and circumstances clearly does not permit a specific decision by the President." Russia has a semi automated Dead Hand system which may allow military commanders to act based on certain pre-defined criteria. British nuclear-armed submarine commanders are issued with "letters of last resort" written by the Prime Minister containing secret instructions which may or may not give them delegated launch authority.

Launch authority of nuclear states
Country	Authority	Notes
United States	President of the United States	See the Presidential Emergency Satchel.
Russia	President of Russia	Briefcases may also be issued to the Minister of Defence and the Chief of the General Staff.
United Kingdom	Prime Minister of the United Kingdom	The prime minister and a secretly designated 'second' may order a launch. However, as formal commander-in-chief the Monarch can overturn the decision if Ministry of Defence officials refer a disputed launch order for review, and Parliament can challenge through a successful vote of no confidence to remove the Prime Minister.
France	President of France	The Chief of the Military Staff of the President of the Republic and the Chief of the Defence Staff may also be involved in decisions.
China	Chairman of the Central Military Commission	The chairman of the Central Military Commission is the supreme military commander and is held by the Chinese Communist Party general secretary.
India	Prime Minister of India	Nuclear Command Authority includes an Executive Council and a Political Council.
Pakistan	National Command Authority	Approval from National Command Authority and requires a consensus of the council's members.
North Korea	President of the State Affairs	The president of the state affairs is the ultimate decisionmaker in regards to North Korea's nuclear arsenal. The position is held by the WPK general secretary and serves as the supreme leader of North Korea.
Israel	Prime Minister of Israel	Requires agreement of the Minister of Defense and Chief of the General Staff.

== Nuclear weapons sharing ==
=== Nuclear weapons shared by the United States ===
Weapons provided for nuclear sharing (2019)
Country	Base	Estimated
Belgium	Kleine Brogel	20
Germany	Büchel	20
Italy	Aviano	20
Italy	Ghedi	20
Netherlands	Volkel	20
Turkey	Incirlik	20
		100

Under NATO nuclear weapons sharing, the United States has provided nuclear weapons for Belgium, Germany, Italy, the Netherlands, and Turkey to deploy and store. This involves pilots and other staff of the "non-nuclear" NATO states practicing, handling, and delivering the US nuclear bombs, and adapting non-US warplanes to deliver US nuclear bombs. However, since all US nuclear weapons are protected with Permissive Action Links, the host states cannot easily arm the bombs without authorization codes from the US Department of Defense. Former Italian president Francesco Cossiga acknowledged the presence of US nuclear weapons in Italy. US nuclear weapons were also deployed in Canada as well as Greece from 1963. However, the United States withdrew three of the four nuclear-capable weapons systems from Canada by 1972, the fourth by 1984, and all nuclear-capable weapons systems from Greece by 2001. As of April 2019, the United States maintained around 100 nuclear weapons in Europe, as reflected in the accompanying table.

=== Nuclear weapons shared by Russia ===
Russian nuclear weapons in host countries
Country	Air base	Warheads
Belarus	Probably Lida	~130

Since June 2023, the leaders of Russia and Belarus have claimed that a "number of" nuclear weapons are located on Belarusian territory while remaining in Russian possession. Sources hostile to these countries have confirmed that nuclear warheads have been delivered to Belarus, but claim that the first transfers were instead made in August 2023. Russia's stated intention is to provide Belarus with two delivery systems: dual-capable Iskander-M missile systems and necessary training and modifications for Belarusian Su-25 aircraft to carry nuclear weapons.

The deployment of Russian weapons to Belarus was framed by Russian president Vladimir Putin as being equivalent to the deployments of American nuclear weapons to NATO countries in Europe under international law.

Belarus also had single warhead missiles stationed on its territory into the 1990s while a constituent of the Soviet Union. When the Soviet Union collapsed in 1991, 81 single warhead missiles were stationed on newly Belarusian territory, but were all transferred to Russia by 1996. Belarus acceded to the Nuclear Non-Proliferation Treaty (NPT) in February 1993.

=== Criticism of nuclear weapons sharing ===
Members of the Non-Aligned Movement have called on all countries to "refrain from nuclear sharing for military purposes under any kind of security arrangements." The Institute of Strategic Studies Islamabad (ISSI) has criticized the arrangement for allegedly violating Articles I and II of the NPT, arguing that "these Articles do not permit the NWS to delegate the control of their nuclear weapons directly or indirectly to others." NATO has argued that the weapons' sharing is compliant with the NPT because "the US nuclear weapons based in Europe are in the sole possession and under constant and complete custody and control of the United States."

== States formerly possessing nuclear weapons ==
Nuclear weapons have been present in many nations, often as staging grounds under control of other powers. However, in only one instance has a nation given up nuclear weapons after being in full control of them. The fall of the Soviet Union left several former Soviet republics in physical possession of nuclear weapons, although not operational control which was dependent on Russian-controlled electronic Permissive Action Links and the Russian command and control system. Of these, Kazakhstan and Ukraine continue to have neither their own nuclear weapons nor another state's nuclear weapons stationed in their territory whereas Belarus does again claim to have Russian-owned nuclear weapons stationed on its territory since 2023.

=== South Africa ===
Alleged spare bomb casings from South Africa's nuclear weapon programme. Their purpose is disputed.

South Africa produced six nuclear weapons, obtaining its first in 1982, but dismantled them in the early 1990s.

In 1979, there was a detection of a putative covert nuclear test in the Indian Ocean, called the Vela incident. It has long been speculated that it was a test by Israel, in collaboration with and with the support of South Africa, though this has never been confirmed. South Africa could not have constructed such a nuclear bomb by itself until November 1979, two months after the "double flash" incident.

South Africa acceded to the Nuclear Non-Proliferation Treaty in 1991.

=== Former Soviet republics ===
- Kazakhstan had 1,400 Soviet-era nuclear weapons on its territory and transferred them all to Russia by 1995, after Kazakhstan acceded to the NPT.
- Ukraine had an estimated 1,700 nuclear weapons deployed on its territory when it became independent from the Soviet Union in 1991, equivalent to the third-largest nuclear arsenal in the world. At the time Ukraine acceded to the NPT in December 1994, Ukraine had agreed to dispose of all nuclear weapons within its territory. The warheads were removed from Ukraine by 1996 and disassembled in Russia. Despite Russia's subsequent and internationally disputed annexation of Crimea in 2014, Ukraine reaffirmed its 1994 decision to accede to the Nuclear Non-Proliferation Treaty as a non-nuclear-weapon state.

In connection with their accession to the NPT, all three countries where Soviet nuclear weapons were based (Kazakhstan, Ukraine, and Belarus) received assurances that their sovereignty, independence, and territorial integrity would be respected, as stated in the Budapest Memorandum on Security Assurances. These assurances have been flouted by Russia since the Russo-Ukrainian War began in 2014, during which Russia claimed to annex Crimea, occupied Eastern Ukraine, and in 2022, launched a full-scale invasion, with limited responses by the other signatories.

=== Soviet stationed countries ===
==== Cuba ====
On 16 to 28 October 1962, a 13-day confrontation between the governments of the United States and the Soviet Union occurred when American deployments of nuclear missiles in the United Kingdom, Italy and Turkey were matched by Soviet deployments of nuclear missiles in Cuba.

An agreement was eventually reached between John F. Kennedy and Nikita Khrushchev, the leaders of both countries during the crisis, wherein the Soviets would dismantle their offensive weapons in Cuba in exchange for an American public declaration and agreement not to invade Cuba again. The US also secretly agreed to dismantle all of the offensive weapons it had deployed to Turkey.

=== American stationed countries ===
Up until the 1990s the US had stationed nuclear weapons outside of its territories and sharing countries.

==== South Korea ====
The U.S. kept nuclear weapons in South Korea from 1958 until 1991, with numbers peaking around 950 warheads in the late 1960s.

==== Philippines ====
During the Cold War, specifically during the presidency of Ferdinand Marcos from 1965 to 1986, American nuclear warheads were secretly stockpiled in the Philippines.

==== Taiwan ====
Taiwan was developing capacities to construct nuclear weapons up until 1988. Before 1974, the United States stationed some of its arsenal in Taiwan.

==== Japan ====
After World War II the US had nuclear weapons stationed in Japan until 1972 under a series of secret agreements between the two governments, while still "tacitly" allowing nuclear weapons to enter Japanese harbors on warships as had been outlined in the same earlier secret agreements with Japan.

==== Canada ====
The US stationed nuclear weapons at CFB Goose Bay in Labrador between 1964 and 1984.

==== Greece ====
The US stationed nuclear weapons in Greece until they were removed in 2001.

== See also ==
- Comprehensive Nuclear-Test-Ban Treaty
- Doomsday Clock
- Historical nuclear weapons stockpiles and nuclear tests by country
- Humanitarian impact of nuclear weapons
- International Campaign to Abolish Nuclear Weapons
- No first use
- Nuclear disarmament
- Nuclear latency
- Nuclear power
- Nuclear program of Iran
- Nuclear proliferation
- Nuclear terrorism
- Nuclear warfare
- Nuclear-weapon-free zone

== Bibliography ==
- International Institute for Strategic Studies (7 March 2012). Hackett, James (ed.). The Military Balance 2012. London, England: Routledge. ISBN 978-1857436426.
- Farr, Warner D. (September 1999), The Third Temple's holy of holies: Israel's nuclear weapons, The Counterproliferation Papers, Future Warfare Series, vol. 2, USAF Counterproliferation Center, Air War College, Air University, Maxwell Air Force Base, ISBN 978-1543084061.
- Philipp C. Bleek, “When Did (and Didn’t) States Proliferate? Chronicling the Spread of Nuclear Weapons,” Discussion Paper (Cambridge, MA: Project on Managing the Atom, Belfer Center for Science and International Affairs, June 2017).
