= Kh-90 =

Russian hypersonic cruise missile

Kh-90 GELA (NATO reporting name: AS-X-21)
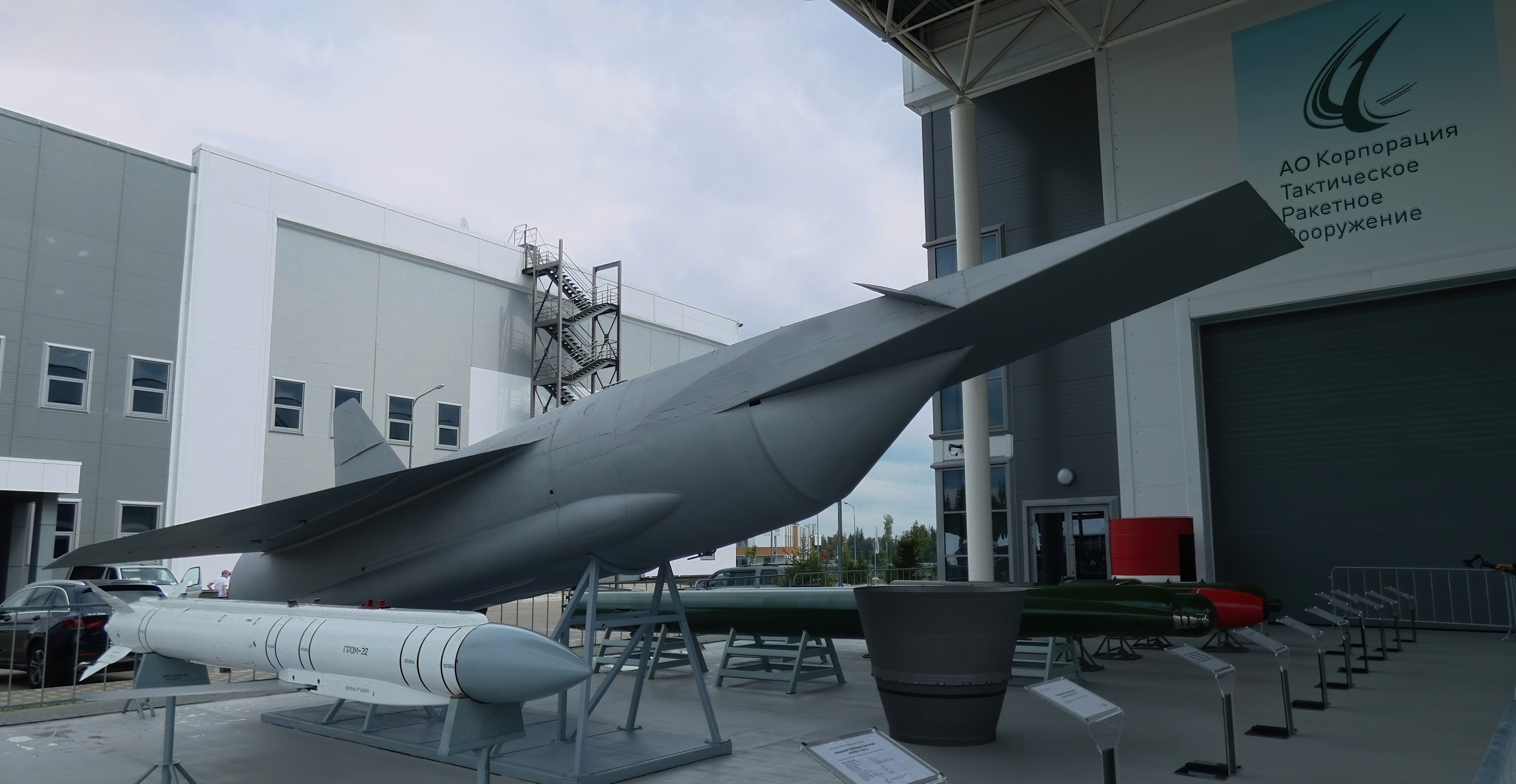
- Type: Air-launched Hypersonic weapon
- Place of origin: Russia

Production history
- Manufacturer: MKB Raduga, Turaevo TMKB Soyuz, TsAGI

Specifications
- Mass: 15 metric tons
- Length: 11 m
- Diameter: 0.8 - 0.9m
- Wingspan: 7m
- Warhead: various: HE, FAE, TBX, two nuclear each 1.2 Mt
- Warhead weight: 200 kg to < 1.6 ton HE, 200 kg < 1.82 ton TNW
- Engine: booster + Ramjet Raduga TMKB Soyuz (or Scramjet ?) TsAGI
- Propellant: solid propellant booster, liquid ramjet (or scramjet), kerosene
- Maximum speed: Mach 5+
- Guidance system: inertial, TERCOM, GLONASS, Radar, IR IIR, TV camera, Opto-Electronic, CCD
- Launch platform: Aircraft, can be loaded on ship ground TEL, maybe submarine

The Kh-90 GELA (Russian: ГЭЛА (гиперзвуковой экспериментальный летательный аппарат), Hypersonic Experimental Flight Vehicle) is a Soviet/Russian air-to-surface hypersonic missile. It was supposed to replace subsonic intermediate range missiles in the Soviet inventory. The missile was an ambitious project, as the main objective was to develop it into a hypersonic missile. It was to be a successor to the Kh-45, which never entered service.

The missile was designed by Raduga. It was equipped with a one-megaton thermonuclear warhead and used inertial navigation with mid-course update via data link. It had a maximum range of 3,000 km.

It was developed at the beginning of 1980, following the Kh-80 and Kholod projects. It was shown to the public an MAKS Airshow 1995.

== See also ==
- Advanced Strategic Air-Launched Missile
- Hypersonic Attack Cruise Missile
- Ra'ad
- SOM
- Ya-Ali
- Shahab-3
- Fajr-3
- Shaheen-III
- Ashoura (missile)
- Sejjil
- Ghauri-I
- Ababeel
