= Tayfun (missile) =

Turkish Short-range ballistic missile

Tayfun/Typhoon
- Type: Short-range ballistic missile Medium-range ballistic missile
- Place of origin: Turkey

Service history
- In service: 2023
- Used by: See Users

Production history
- Designer: Roketsan
- Designed: 2022
- Manufacturer: Roketsan
- Produced: 2023 - present
- No. built: Unknown
- Variants: Tayfun (for Turkey)

Specifications
- Mass: Tayfun Block 1: 2300 kg; Tayfun Block 4: 7200 kg
- Length: Tayfun Block 1 6.5 m; Tayfun Block 4 10 m
- Diameter: Tayfun Block 1 610 mm; Tayfun Block 4 938 mm
- Effective firing range: Tayfun Block 1: 800 km (500 mi); Tayfun Block 4: 1,000–1,500 km (620–930 mi)
- Warhead: HE or fragmentation
- Payload capacity: Tayfun Block 1: 500 kg; Tayfun Block 4: 700-1000 kg
- Propellant: Composite solid propellant
- Maximum speed: Tayfun Block 1: Mach 5-6 Tayfun Block 4: Mach 5-10
- Guidance system: GPS + GLONASS aided INS / INS only
- Accuracy: GPS + GLONASS Aided INS: ≤5 m CEP
- Launch platform: VOLAT truck

Tayfun (Typhoon) is a Short-range ballistic missile and Medium-range ballistic missile family developed on the basis of the Bora (missile) by Turkish state-owned Roketsan. It is Turkey's first missile of its kind. Turkey accidentally revealed the Typhoon during a test launch on October 20, 2022.

Tayfun Block 4, a new and more advanced version of Tayfun, was introduced to the media on 23 July 2025.

== Design and production ==
Since Tayfun was developed secretly, there is no information about its design period. Although the characteristics of the missile were unknown, it was later announced by the Ministry of National Defense. According to the Ministry's statement during the first test, Tayfun hit its target from a distance of 561 kilometers in a duration of 456 seconds.

Tayfun was successfully tested again on 23 May 2023 and right after entered mass production on 29 May 2023. In a test conducted in Rize, a city on the Black Sea coast of Turkey, on February 3, 2025, Tayfun successfully hit a target on the sea, hundreds of kilometers away. Hit accuracy was 5 meters. Developed by Roketsan under the coordination of the Presidency of Defense Industries (SSB), Tayfun is Turkey's first short-range ballistic missile (SRBM), advancing the nation's missile technology beyond tactical ballistic missile systems. Tayfun missile successfully hit a target on the sea off the coast of Sinop. Some experts pointed out the difference in distance between Rize and Sinop, stating that Tayfun has a range of 500 to 800 km and that Turkey has advanced in terms of both range and precision in ballistic missiles.

=== Tayfun Block 2 ===
The Turkish Ministry of Defense announced that the Tayfun Block-2 missile entered the inventory of the Turkish Armed Forces on May 2026.

=== Tayfun Block 3 ===
On July 4, 2026, Roketsan shared video footage of a missile test. According to a statement from Roketsan, the test successfully struck an unmanned boat sailing on the sea using a Tayfun Block 3 missile. The missile reportedly struck the boat using a seeker head. This test marked the first time the Tayfun missile was used against a naval target and the first time it employed a "seeker head."

=== Tayfun Block 4 ===
At IDEF 2025, Roketsan announced a new missile called the "Tayfun Block 4". According to the statement, Block 4, unlike the first version, has been almost doubled in length to 10 meters, while the weight of the missile has been increased from 2 tons to 7 tons, almost fourfold. In October 2025, it was reported that the missile was successfully tested.

== Impact ==
The missile was noticed by members of the press during a test in Rize, and the sudden appearance of this new weapon caused tension between Turkish-Greek relations. Later Erdoğan said at an event in northern Samsun province, "Now we have started to build our missiles. Of course, this production frightens the Greeks. When you say ‘Tayfun' (Typhoon), the Greek is scared. They say it will hit Athens. Of course, it will hit it." Greek Foreign Minister Nikos Dendias criticized Erdogan's words, saying, "North Korean attitudes cannot and must not enter the North Atlantic Alliance."

Erdogan later stated that the range of the missile would be increased from 565 km to 1000 km. Roketsan CEO said that Tayfun is in mass production, but work is ongoing to improve its range and increase production numbers.

== Users ==
- Turkey

== Variants ==
- Bora (missile) (Tactical Ballistic Missile)
- Cenk (missile) (Medium-Range Ballistic Missile)

== Comparable missiles ==
- J-600T Yıldırım – (Turkey)
- Fateh-313 – (Iran)
- Raad-500
- Scud missile – (Soviet Union)
- 9K720 Iskander – (Russia)
- Zolfaghar (missile) – (Iran)
- Nasr (missile) – (Pakistan)
- DF-15 – (China)
- Hyunmoo – (South Korea)
- Shaheen-I – (Pakistan)
- Hwasong-11A – (North Korea)
- Çakır (missile) – (Turkey)
- Yıldırımhan
