= Yıldırımhan =

Turkish liquid-fueled intercontinental ballistic missile

- Type: Intercontinental ballistic missile (ICBM)
- Place of origin: Turkey

Service history
- In service: 2030s (Expected)
- Used by: Turkish Armed Forces (planned)

Production history
- Designer: MSB ARGE
- Manufacturer: MSB R&D Center
- Produced: 2026 (Prototype)

Specifications
- Mass: ~30,000 kg (Estimated)
- Length: 17.5 m
- Diameter: 1,200 mm (Estimated)
- Detonation mechanism: Proximity / Impact
- Engine: 4-engine liquid-fuel cluster (Stage 1)
- Propellant: Liquid (Nitrogen Tetroxide / Hydrazine)
- Operational range: 6,000+ km (3,728 miles)
- Guidance system: Inertial, Optical, and Satellite-aided
- Launch platform: Mobile Transporter Erector Launcher (TEL) / Silo

The Yıldırımhan (Turkish for "Thunderbolt Khan") is Turkey's first intercontinental ballistic missile (ICBM). Developed by MSB ARGE, the research and development center of the Turkish Ministry of National Defense, it currently represents the longest-range missile in the country's military inventory. Unveiled in May 2026, it represents the pinnacle of the "Steel Dome" defense initiative and is the first Turkish delivery system capable of reaching intercontinental distances, with a reported range exceeding 6,000 km.

== Development ==
The development of the Yıldırımhan represents a significant departure from Türkiye's previous ballistic missile programs, such as the J-600T Yıldırım, Bora, Tayfun, and Cenk, which were predominantly short- to medium-range, solid-fueled systems developed primarily by Roketsan. The Yıldırımhan program is spearheaded directly by MSB ARGE in secret, signaling a highly classified strategic priority.

The missile was publicly unveiled for the first time as a mock-up by Turkish Defense Minister Yaşar Güler on May 5, 2026, during the SAHA 2026 International Defence and Aerospace Exhibition at the Istanbul Expo Center. During the presentation, Güler emphasized that the project was part of Turkey's "Century of Türkiye" vision to achieve complete strategic autonomy and reduce reliance on NATO's nuclear umbrella for long-range deterrence.

As of its unveiling in 2026, no official program timeline, prototype completion dates, or future testing schedules have been publicly disclosed.

== Design and specifications ==
Official technical details regarding the Yıldırımhan remain strictly guarded, but preliminary data and visual analyses from the SAHA 2026 exhibition provide an overview of its architecture and capabilities:

=== Propulsion ===
Unlike earlier Turkish missiles that rely on solid propellants, the Yıldırımhan utilizes a liquid-fuel propulsion system. The missile uses nitrogen tetroxide (N₂O₄) as an oxidizer, which implies the use of a hypergolic fuel counterpart such as a hydrazine derivative (e.g., Aerozine 50 or UDMH). It features a multi-stage architecture, widely believed by defense analysts to be a three-stage system. The first stage uses a cluster of four liquid-propellant rocket engines to provide the high thrust required for its estimated 30-tonne lift weight.

=== Payload and warhead ===
The Yıldırımhan has a reported payload capacity of 3,000 kg. The geometry of the missile's nose cone suggests it is optimized to be compatible with multiple independently targetable reentry vehicles (MIRV). This has led international defense analysts to speculate on its potential for a future nuclear role.

== Strategic implications ==
Within NATO, only the United States, the United Kingdom, and France currently possess comparable long-range delivery systems. Analysts suggest the missile provides Turkey with strategic leverage within the alliance, mirroring the independent strategic postures of France and the UK.

== See also ==
- Tayfun (missile)
- J-600T Yıldırım
- Bora (missile)
- List of ICBMs
- Defense industry of Turkey
