= Cenk (missile) =

Turkish Medium-range ballistic missile

- Type: Medium-range ballistic missile
- Place of origin: Turkey

Service history
- Used by: See Users

Production history
- Designer: Roketsan
- Manufacturer: Roketsan
- Variants: Cenk (for Turkey)

Specifications
- Maximum firing range: 2,000 km
- Warhead: HE or fragmentation
- Propellant: Composite solid propellant
- Maximum speed: Mach 5 for missile
- Guidance system: GPS + GLONASS aided INS / INS only
- Accuracy: GPS + GLONASS Aided INS: ≤10 m CEP; INS Only: ≤ 100 m CEP

The Cenk (Turkish: War) is a medium-range ballistic missile developed based on the Tayfun missile by Turkish state-owned Roketsan. It is Turkey's first MRBM system. The images of the Cenk ballistic missile, announced by President Recep Tayyip Erdoğan following the introduction of Tayfun (missile), were displayed for the first time by the SSB head on May 12, 2023.

== Users ==
- Turkey

== Variants ==
- Bora (missile) (Tactical Ballistic Missile)
- Tayfun (missile) (Short-Range Ballistic Missile)

== Comparable missiles ==
- J-600T Yıldırım
- Fateh-313
- Raad-500
- Scud missile
- 9K720 Iskander
- Zolfaghar (missile)
- Nasr (missile)
- DF-15
- Hyunmoo
- Shaheen-I
- Hwasong-11A
- Çakır (missile)
