= Sky Spear =

Taiwanese short-range ballistic missile

- Type: Short-range ballistic missile
- Place of origin: Taiwan

Service history
- In service: 2001-current

Production history
- Designer: National Chung-Shan Institute of Science and Technology
- No. built: Unknown

Specifications
- Mass: 1,150 kg
- Length: 8.0 m
- Width: 0.41 m
- Payload capacity: 500 kg
- Propellant: Two-stage solid propellant
- Operational range: 300 kilometres (190 mi)
- Launch platform: Transporter erector launcher or silo
- Transport: Truck

The Sky Spear (天戟 Tien Chi) is a Taiwanese short-range ballistic missile (SRBM). Derived from the Sky Bow II (Tien Kung-2) surface-to-air missile, the Tien Chi has a two-stage booster that extends over the single-stage Tien Kung-2. The Sky Spear was developed by the Chungshan Institute of Science and Technology (CSIST) in Taiwan. As of early 2001, up to 50 Tien Chi missiles were deployed at two sites: Tungyin Island, and an unidentified second location. The Tungyin Island missiles are said to be housed in silos and protected by batteries of Tien Kung-2 SAMs.

== Description ==
Information provided by CSIST to Jane's Missiles and Rockets, revealed that Tien Chi uses a submunition warhead and there is no unitary warhead for this missile. According to this report, Tien Chi was developed by CSIST following test firings of a Tien Kung 2 variant with a 120 km range and a 90 kg HE warhead. The report also credited Tien Chi missile with a range of 300 km and a 500 kg payload. This range is well beyond the reported 200 km maximum range of the Tien Kung II SAM system, but since Tien Chi is used in a tactical surface-to-surface missile role, it would fly a more efficient trajectory with no need for energy-consuming manoeuvres. Guidance is believed to be an integrated INS/GPS system.

== History ==
It has been reported that Taiwan has deployed 15-50 missiles on Tungyin and Penghu.

== Variants ==
According to the Taipei Times retired president of NCSIST Kung Chia-cheng claimed that two variants were developed, one with a range of 600km and the other with a 1000km+ range. Taiwanese President Chen Shui-bian was reportedly very surprised by how large the missiles were when he went to inspect them.

== General characteristics ==
- Primary Function: Surface-to-surface missile
- Warhead Weight 100 kg

== See also ==
- Hrim-2 (missile system) – (Ukraine)
- 9K720 Iskander – (Russia)
- DF-11 – (China)
- Khalij Fars – (Iran)
- Ghaznavi – (Pakistan)
- Abdali-I – (Pakistan)
- Shaheen-I – (Pakistan)
- J-600T Yıldırım – (Turkey)
- Fateh-313 – (Iran)
- Qiam 1 – (Iran)
- B-611 – (China)
- Al Hussein (missile) – (Iraq)
- Burkan-1 – (Yemen)
