= Samen (missile) =

Type of ballistic missile

Samen/Ghadr-101
- Type: SRBM
- Place of origin: Iran

Production history
- Designed: 2008-09-21

Specifications
- Length: 9.0 m
- Diameter: 1.0-1.25 m
- Propellant: solid propellant
- Operational range: 750-800 km

The Samen (Persian: سامن) or Ghadr-101 missile is a road-mobile solid propelled SRBM that was revealed during a military parade in September 2008. It was tested on 10 November 2008, as a response to a US missile-shield test that took place on 3 November 2008. Details of the missile after that were kept classified.

The missile is believed to be derived from the DF-15 rocket and have received help with its Ashoura (missile)/Ghadr-110 MRBM replacement for the Shahab-3 ballistic missile. Iran is believed to have obtained the technology from A.Q Khan's proliferation network. The Ghadr 101 motor rocket was believed to have been completed in 2005. It is suggested that the Ghadr-101 along with Ghadr-110 will provide Iran with ASAT and IRBM capability.

== Characteristics ==
It has a triconic warhead. Whether it is single-stage or 2-stage is still unknown. It has a payload capacity of 650–1,158 kg of high-explosive. Its diameter is 1.0-1.25 m, and is 9 m long. It has a range of 750–800 km.
