= Security assurance =

Expression of doctrine by a nuclear-armed nation

A security assurance, in the context of nuclear warfare, is an expression of a political position by a nuclear-armed nation intended to placate other non-nuclear-armed nations. There are two types of security assurance: positive and negative. A positive assurance states that the nation giving it will aid any or a particular non-nuclear-armed nation in retaliation if it is a victim of nuclear attack. A negative assurance is not the opposite but instead means that a nuclear-armed nation has promised not to use nuclear weapons except in retaliation for a nuclear attack against itself (a policy known as No first use).

Security assurances are a key part of nuclear diplomacy, and since they are statements of intent, not guarantees, they are based entirely on trust and the threat of retaliation should they be broken. Thus, Security Assurances have been issued and changed over time, and are vital tools in the Nuclear Non-Proliferation Treaty (NPT). U.S. President Barack Obama modified the specific conditions of the US Negative Security Assurance on 6 April 2010 citing "the importance of nations meeting their NPT and nuclear non-proliferation obligations."

China is so far the only nation to issue a positive security assurance in April 1995, and at the same time, it issued a negative security assurance. China stated that despite its willingness to use nuclear weapons, it "[should] not in any way be construed as endorsing the use of nuclear weapons." The dichotomy of such a position has led for calls to make more use of protocols attached to NWFZ (nuclear-weapon-free zone) treaties, instead of generalized security assurances.

== See also ==
- Budapest Memorandum on Security Assurances 1994
- International Commission on Nuclear Non-proliferation and Disarmament
- Nuclear warfare
- List of countries with nuclear weapons
- Nuclear peace
- Proliferation Security Initiative (PSI)
- Strategic Offensive Reductions Treaty (SORT)
- New Agenda Coalition (NAC)
