= Short-range ballistic missile =

Ballistic missile with a range of about 1,000 kilometres

A short-range ballistic missile (SRBM) is a ballistic missile with a range of 300 km (190 mi) to 1,000 km (620 mi). In past and potential regional conflicts, these missiles have been and would be used because of the short distances between some countries and their relative low cost and ease of configuration. In modern terminology, SRBMs are part of the wider grouping of theatre ballistic missiles, which includes any ballistic missile with a range of less than 3,500 km.

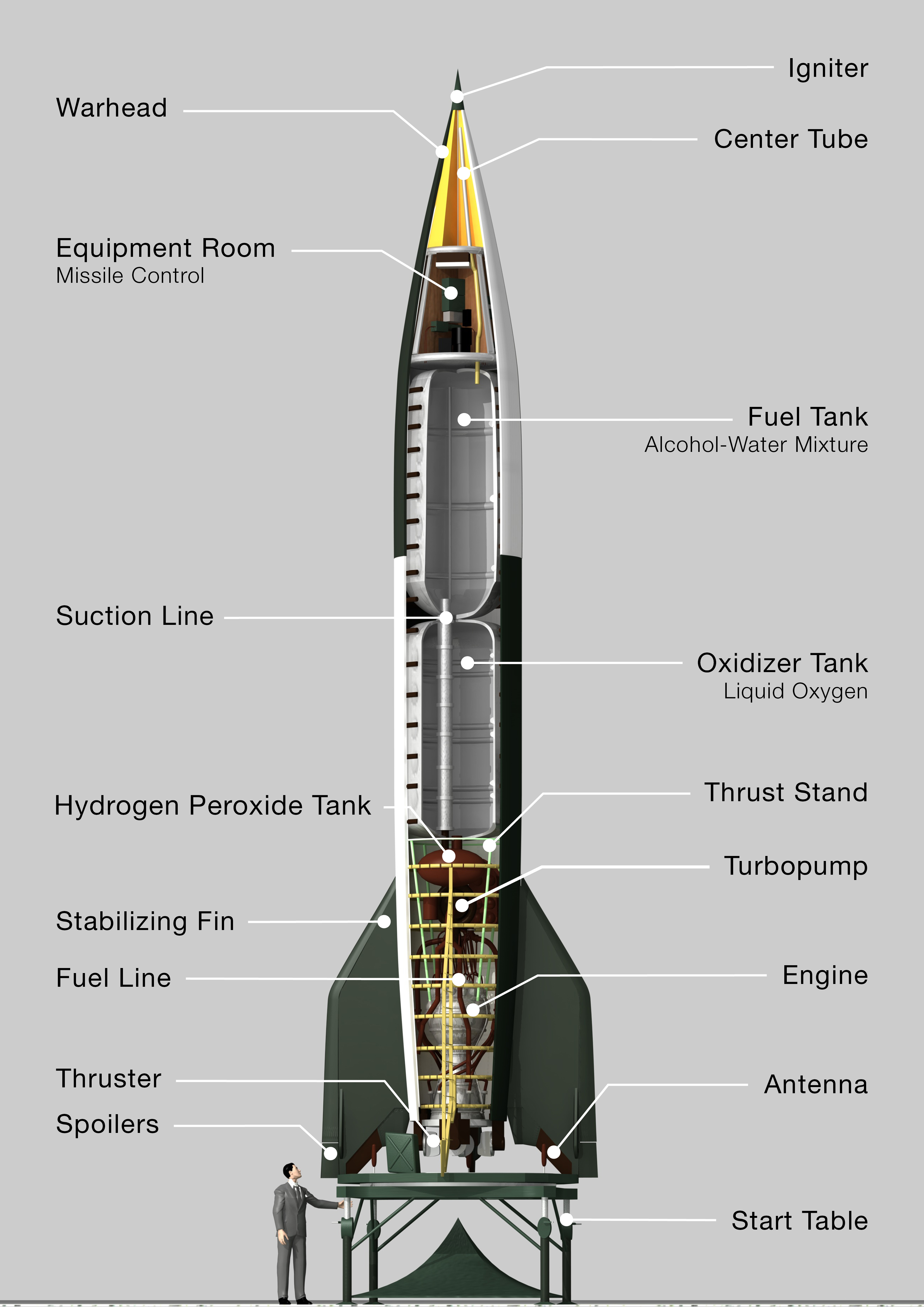
Sectional view of the missile Aggregat 4 / V 2

== Models ==
Models by country
Country	Model name	Year	Range
Brazil	Brazilian short-range ballistic missile	TBA (in development)	300 km (190 mi)
China	B-611	2004	150–280 km (93–174 mi)
China	BP-12A	2010	300 km (190 mi)
China	DF-11	1992	350 km (220 mi)
China	DF-12/M20	2013	280–400 km (170–250 mi)
China	DF-15	1990	600 km (370 mi)
France	Hadès	1991	480 km (300 mi)
France	Pluton	1974	120 km (75 mi)
France	SE4200	1950	100 km (62 mi)
India	Agni-I	2004	700–900 km (430–560 mi)
India	K-15	2018	750 km (470 mi)
India	Prahaar	2011	150 km (93 mi)
India	Pragati	2013	170 km (110 mi)
India	Pralay	2021	150–500 km (93–311 mi)
India	Pranash	2021	200 km (120 mi)
India	Prithvi I	1994	150 km (93 mi)
India	Prithvi II	2004	230–350 km (140–220 mi)
India	Prithvi III	2004	350–750 km (220–470 mi)
India	Shaurya	2011	700–1,900 km (430–1,180 mi)
Indonesia	R-Han 550	TBA (In development)	300–533 km (186–331 mi)
Iran	Fateh-110	2002	300 km (190 mi)
Iran	Fateh-313	2015	500 km (310 mi)
Iran	Fateh Mobin	2018	300 km (190 mi)
Iran	Naze'at	1982	100–130 km (62–81 mi)
Iran	Qiam 1	2010	700–800 km (430–500 mi)
Iran	Ra'ad-500	2020	500 km (310 mi)
Iran	Samen	2008	750–800 km (470–500 mi)
Iran	Shahab-1	1985	350 km (220 mi)
Iran	Shahab-2	1990	750 km (470 mi)
Iran	Tondar-69	1992	150 km (93 mi)
Iran	Zelzal-1	1990	150 km (93 mi)
Iran	Zelzal-2	1998	210 km (130 mi)
Iran	Zelzal-3	2007	200–250 km (120–160 mi)
Iran	Zolfaghar/Zulfiqar	2016	700 km (430 mi)
Iraq	Al Abbas	Never entered service	800–950 km (500–590 mi)
Iraq	Al Fat'h	1991	160 km (99 mi)
Iraq	Al Hussein	1987	600–650 km (370–400 mi)
Iraq	Al Hijarah	1990	700–900 km (430–560 mi)
Iraq	Al-Samoud 2	2003	180 km (110 mi)
Israel	Jericho I	1971	500 km (310 mi)
Israel	LORA	2018	300 km (190 mi)
Israel	Predator Hawk	2016	300 km (190 mi)
Japan	HVGP (Block 1)	2025 (planned)	300–500 km (190–310 mi)
Nazi Germany	V-2 missile	1944	320 km (200 mi)
Nazi Germany	Rheinbote	1944	160 km (99 mi)
North Korea	Hwasong-5	1985	320 km (200 mi)
North Korea	Hwasong-6	1990	500 km (310 mi)
North Korea	Hwasong-7	1988	700–995 km (435–618 mi)
North Korea	Hwasong-11	2008	120–220 km (75–137 mi)
North Korea	KN-18	2017	450 km (280 mi)
North Korea	Hwasong-11A (KN-23)	2018	250–700 km (160–430 mi)
North Korea	Hwasong-11B (KN-24)	2019	410 km (250 mi)
North Korea	KN-25 (Claimed by the US and South Korea)	2019	380 km (236 mi)
North Korea	Hwasong-11C	2021	About 600 km (370 mi)
Pakistan	Abdali-I	2002	200 km (120 mi)
Pakistan	Ghaznavi	2004	290–320 km (180–200 mi)
Pakistan	Hatf-I	1989	70 km (43 mi)
Pakistan	Hatf-IA	1995	100 km (62 mi)
Pakistan	Hatf-IB	2001	100 km (62 mi)
Pakistan	Nasr	2011	70–90 km (43–56 mi)
Pakistan	Shaheen-1	1999	900 km (560 mi)
Pakistan	Shaheen-1 A	2012	1,000 km (620 mi)
Serbia	Šumadija	2017	75–285 km (47–177 mi)
South Korea	Hyunmoo-1	1986	180–250 km (110–160 mi)
South Korea	Hyunmoo-2	2008	300–800 km (190–500 mi)
South Korea	Hyunmoo-4	2020	800 km (500 mi)
South Korea	KTSSM	2017	120 km (75 mi)
Soviet Union Russia	9K720 Iskander	2006	>500 km (310 mi) (Russia)
Soviet Union Russia	OTR-21 Tochka-U	1989	70–185 km (43–115 mi) (Soviet Union) / (Russia)
Soviet Union Russia	OTR-23 Oka	1979	>500 km (310 mi) (Soviet Union)
Soviet Union Russia	R-1	1950	270 km (170 mi) (Soviet Union)
Soviet Union Russia	R-2	1951	600–1,200 km (370–750 mi) (Soviet Union)
Soviet Union Russia	Scud missile	1957	180–700 km (110–430 mi) (Soviet Union)
Soviet Union Russia	TR-1 Temp	1969	900 km (560 mi) (Soviet Union)
Taiwan	Sky Spear	2001	300 km (190 mi)
Taiwan	Sky Horse	Cancelled	600–950 km (370–590 mi)
Turkey	BORA I	2017	80–280 km (50–174 mi)
Turkey	Tayfun	2022	560–900 km (350–560 mi)
Turkey	J-600T Yıldırım I	1998	150 km (93 mi)
Ukraine	Hrim-2	2018	50–500 km (31–311 mi)
Ukraine	Fire Point FP-9	2026	0–850 km (0–528 mi)
United States	MGM-5 Corporal	1954	48–130 km (30–81 mi)
United States	PGM-11 Redstone	1958	92–323 km (57–201 mi)
United States	MGM-18 Lacrosse	1959	19 km (12 mi)
United States	MGM-29 Sergeant	1962	139 km (86 mi)
United States	MGM-31 Pershing	1963	740 km (460 mi)
United States	MGM-52 Lance	1972	70–120 km (43–75 mi)
United States	MGM-140 ATACMS	1991	128–300 km (80–186 mi)
United States	Precision Strike Missile	2023	over 499 km (310 mi)
Yemen	Burkan-1	2016	800 km (500 mi)
Yemen	Burkan-2	2017	≥1,000 km (620 mi)
Yemen	Qaher-1	2015	250 km (160 mi)

== See also ==
- Tactical ballistic missile
- Medium-range ballistic missile (MRBM)
- Intermediate-range ballistic missile (IRBM)
- Intercontinental ballistic missile (ICBM)
- Anti-ship ballistic missile (ASBM)
- Hypersonic cruise missile
