= Jihad (missile) =

- Type: Medium-range ballistic missile

Service history
- In service: 21 September 2024 Unveiled
- Used by: Iran

Production history
- Manufacturer: Iran

Specifications
- Mass: 7,029 kg (15,496 lb)
- Length: 11.85 m (38.9 ft)
- Diameter: 0.88 m (2.9 ft) (body)
- Engine: Liquid fuel rocket
- Operational range: 1,000 km (620 mi)
- Maximum speed: Mach 8.5

The Jihad missile (Persian: موشک جهاد) is the Islamic Revolutionary Guard Corps's (IRGC) latest medium-range, pinpoint ballistic missile, which was unveiled on September 21, 2024, at the Islamic Republic of Iran Armed Forces Parade. This all-Iranian missile was designed and manufactured by the Aerospace Force of the Islamic Revolutionary Guard Corps. The structure and platform of the Jihad missile are similar to the Emad and Qiam missiles. One of the advantages of this missile is that it is deployed in two launchers, which increases the volume of fire and allows for firing in larger numbers with fewer launchers. This missile flies at low altitude and does not leave the atmosphere, which is why its detection and countermeasures in radar systems are delayed.

== Specifications ==
- Range: 1,000 kilometers
- Maximum speed: 2,935 meters per second (Mach 8.5)
- Length: 11.85 meters
- Diameter: 88 centimeters
- Total weight: 7,029 kilograms
- Warhead weight: 591 kilograms
- Fuel: Single-stage liquid fuel
