= Hyper Velocity Gliding Projectile =

Japanese hypersonic glide vehicle

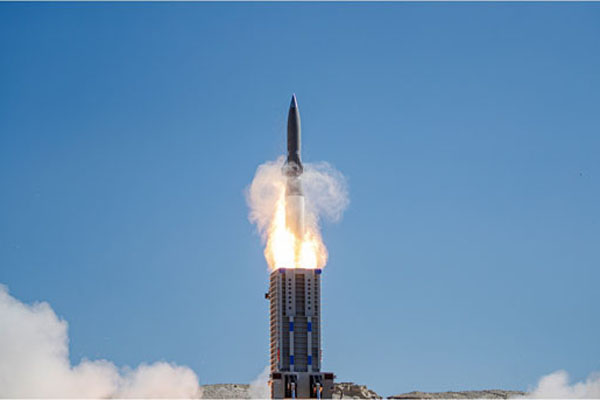
Launch test of the Hyper Velocity Gliding Projectile conducted in California.

The Hyper Velocity Gliding Projectile (HVGP) (島嶼防衛用高速滑空弾, Tōsyobōeiyō-kōsoku-kakkūdan) is a Japanese hypersonic glide vehicle being intended to be used as a hypersonic weapon. This is effectively Japan’s first de-facto ballistic missile. While it is officially labeled as a missile for island defense, it is also considered to have potential enemy base attack capabilities. In 2026, the Block 1 variant, with a range of several hundred kilometers, was designated the Type 25 HVGP and deployed for the first time, while the Block 2 variant, with a range of 2,000 kilometers, is scheduled to begin deployment in the 2030s.

== Design and capabilities ==
The HVGP is designed as a standoff missile capable of attacking enemy forces and bases from outside the enemy weapon engagement zone. The development of the HVGP is based on an incremental approach, with Block 1 being developed as an early version based on existing technology, followed by the development of a performance-enhancing Block 2. Both of them are designed for launch using a solid rocket booster, with the projectile separating from it at a high altitude and then gliding at hypersonic speeds until impact. In Block 2, glide performance will be further improved by introducing waverider technology.

Projectile guidance would be primarily provided by satellite navigation, with inertial navigation system as a backup. Radio-frequency imaging and infrared homing would also be used for guidance when engaging moving targets. Special armour-piercing ammunitions, capable of penetrating the deck of aircraft carriers, are used to attack ships, and high-density explosively formed projectiles (EFPs), capable of area suppression, are used to attack ground targets.

Block 1 is expected to be a short-range ballistic missile with an estimated range of 300–500 km (160–270 nmi). Block 2, on the other hand, is planned to be a medium-range ballistic missile with a range of 2,000–3,000 km (1,100–1,600 nmi).

== Deployment ==
The plan is to complete the development of Block 1 by FY2025 and begin deployment in FY2026, and to begin deployment of Block 2 in the 2030s, deploying two battalions in the Japan Ground Self-Defense Force. These batteries are being considered for deployment in Hokkaido and Kyushu.

The development of a submarine-launched version is under consideration, reportedly.

On 31 March 2026, the Block 1 variant, with a range of several hundred kilometers, was designated the Type 25 HVGP and deployed for the first time.
