= Kh-45 =

Kh-45 "Lightning"
- Type: Air-to-surface missile Anti-ship missile
- Place of origin: Soviet Union

Service history
- Used by: Never entered service

Production history
- Variants: See Variants

The Kh-45 Molnija "Lightning" was a Soviet hypersonic anti-ship air-to-surface missile project. It was developed from 1971 as the main armament for the ICD "Raduga"'s T-4 missile carrier bomber. The designers were A. Y. Bereznyak, G. K. Samokhvalov and V. A. Larionov.

== History ==
The Kh-45 was intended to be carried on the Tu-160, but the integration was cancelled in 1976–77. The Kh-45 was cancelled and replaced by a nuclear version of the Kh-55 missile.

== Basic tactical and technical characteristics ==
The Kh-45 weighed 4,500 kg and was 10.8m long.

== See also ==
- Kh-90
