= Fateh Mobin =

Iranian short-range ballistic missile

Fateh Mobin/فاتح مبین
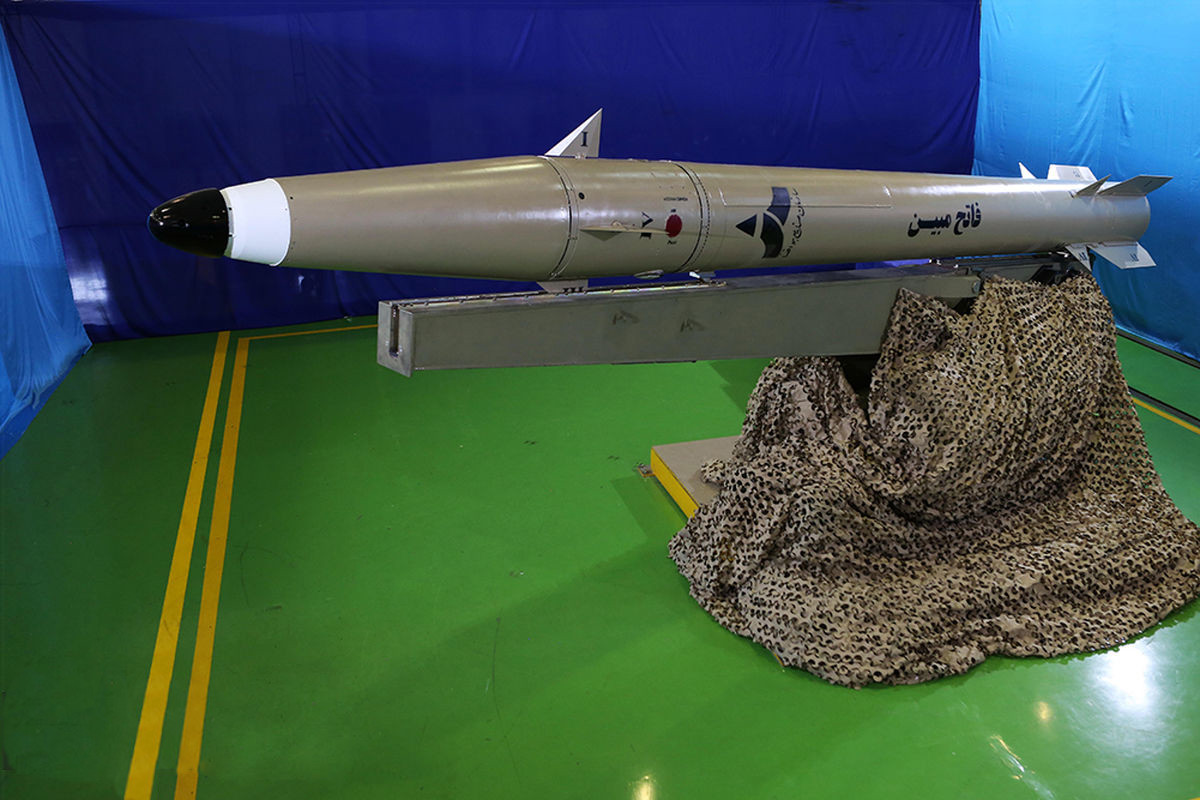
- Type: Short-range ballistic missile
- Place of origin: Iran

Service history
- In service: 2018–present
- Used by: AFAGIR

Specifications
- Length: 9 m
- Propellant: Single-stage solid-propelled
- Operational range: 200–300 km
- Guidance system: Terminal guidance, Infrared homing

The Fateh Mobin is an Iranian single-stage solid propelled Terminal Infrared homing dual surface-to-surface and anti-ship short-range ballistic missile. It was first unveiled on a military parade in Tehran on 13 August 2018 two days after American media reported it. It is an upgraded version of the Fateh-110 with better guidance. The Iranians plan on using its guidance systems on the Zolfaghar SRBM which some sources suggest does have a poor guidance system.

== Characteristics ==
In the words of Iranian defense minister Amir Hatami the missile is purely indigenous, low-observable and precision guided. The missile is thought to be a variant of the Fateh-110 with only a better guidance system and same range of 200–300 km. The missile probably has Terminal guidance through Imaging Infrared which explains its nose cone. A missile with such guidance itself is radar-evasive. The missile has a length of just 9 m which means that it can be loaded in sea containers to be launched from sea platforms.

== See also ==
- Fateh-110
- List of military equipment manufactured in Iran
- Science and technology in Iran
