= SSBS S1 =

1965 French medium-range ballistic missile

SSBS
- Function: Experimental medium-range ballistic missile
- Manufacturer: SEREB
- Country of origin: France

Size
- Height: 15.10 metres (49.5 ft)
- Diameter: 1.50 metres (59 in)
- Mass: 25,000 kilograms (55,000 lb)

Capacity

Payload to {{{to}}}

Launch history
- Status: Retired
- Total launches: 53
- Success(es): 53
- Failure: 0
- Partial failure: 0
- First flight: 23 October 1965
- Last flight: 3 November 1993

stage
- Powered by: S1 LRE liquid
- Maximum thrust: 440 kilonewtons (99,000 lbf)
- Propellant: LOX / UDMH

The SSBS was a series of French military medium-range ballistic missiles.

== Overview ==
The first series, SSBS S1, was launched between 1965 and 1968. It had a maximum altitude of 500 kilometres (310 mi), a lift off thrust of 440 kN, total mass of 25,000 kilograms (55,000 lb), a diameter of 1.50 metres (59 in) and a total length of 15.10 metres (49.5 ft).
