= Tondar-69 =

Tondar
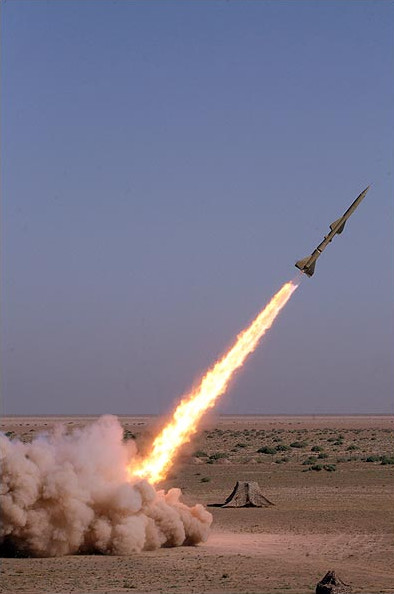
- Type: Short range ballistic missile

Service history
- Used by: Iran

Specifications
- Mass: 2,650 kg
- Length: 10.8 m
- Diameter: 0.65 m (first stage), 0.5 m (second stage)
- Warhead: Single warhead
- Engine: Two-stage: solid-fuel booster and liquid fuel sustainer
- Operational range: 150 km
- Guidance system: Inertial with command updates
- Accuracy: 50 m – 150 m CEP

The Tondar-69 is a short-range ballistic missile (SRBM) originating in China and operated by the armed forces of Iran. It was originally deployed by the Iranian army in 1992. The design is based on the Chinese M-7 (CSS-8), which itself was designed from the Soviet S-75 surface-to-air missile (SAM).

It is launched from static transporter erector launchers towed into position. Up to two hundred CSS-8 missiles were acquired from 1989-1992 and modified to Tondar-69 specifications. The range is estimated as up to 150 km and the payload as up to 190 kg.

Tondar-69s were used in Iran's Great Prophet IV military exercise in September 2009. In 2023, FDD assessed that the Tondar-69 was likely still operational.

== External sources ==
- CSIS Missile Threat - Tondar-69
