= B-611 =

Chinese short-ranged ballistic missile

- Type: Short-range ballistic missile
- Place of origin: China

Service history
- Used by: See § Operators

Production history
- Manufacturer: China Aerospace Science and Industry Corporation (CASIC)

Specifications
- Detonation mechanism: Proximity / impact
- Engine: Solid fuel rocket motor
- Propellant: Solid fuel
- Operational range: 150–400 km (93–249 mi)
- Guidance system: Inertial and optical guidance systems

The B-611 is a Chinese solid-fuelled short-range ballistic missile (SRBM) developed by China Aerospace Science and Industry Corporation (CASIC) and exported via China Precision Machinery Import-Export Corporation (CPMIEC). The missile has a maximum range of 150–400 km (93–249 mi).

== Development ==
The B-611 development began development in 1995, and first shown in 2004. A newer variant was shown in late 2006.

The B-611 was licensed to produce in Turkey, and further developed into the J-600T Yıldırım and Bora missiles.

== Variants ==
=== B611 ===
Basic variant, with a range of 250–280 km (160–170 mi) and a 500 kg (1,100 lb) warhead.

==== B611M ====
Upgraded variant of the B-611, with a 480 kg (1,060 lb) warhead and a range of 80–260 km (50–162 mi).

==== B611MR ====
The B611MR is a semi-ballistic surface-launched anti-radiation missile first advertised in 2014. It uses GPS-inertial guidance and wideband passive radar. The missile is capable of flying flattened trajectory and performing pre-programmed maneuvers to reduce the chance of interception.

=== P-12 ===
The P-12 is a variant of the B-611. The P-12 has longer strakes, and is believed to be lighter than the B-611 and carry a 300 kg (660 lb) HE fragmentation or blast warhead.

A pair of the missiles may be carried inside a 6×6 wheeled vehicle.

The P-12 was first shown at the 2006 China International Aviation & Aerospace Exhibition.

==== BP-12 ====
The BP-12 is a variant that has satellite guidance, and is considered the first member of the family to branch out from the B-611.

==== BP-12A ====
The BP-12A is similar to the Type 631, with an estimated range of 300–400 km (190–250 mi) and a 480 kg (1,060 lb) warhead. The missile can be integrated into the SY-400 missile launcher.

==== BP-12B ====
Latest variant, exhibited at the 2016 China International Aviation & Aerospace Exhibition. It uses radar or infrared homing and can hit slow moving targets like ships.

=== SY-400 ===
In the 2008 Zhuhai Airshow, China Aerospace Science and Industry Corporation (CASIC) revealed its first MLRS design, SY-400. The SY-400 rocket was developed from the B-611 ballistic missile, but with a smaller size and a caliber of 400 mm (16 in). The BP-12A tactical ballistic missile was presented as an optional armament. In the 2014 Zhuhai Airshow, the CASIC unveiled the SY-300 MLRS, a 300 mm (12 in) variant of the SY-400.

The SY-400 tactical ballistic missile system is modular. It can carry either eight 400 mm (16 in) SY-400 rockets with a range of 180 km (110 mi), two BP-12A tactical ballistic missiles with a range of 400 km (250 mi), or twelve 300 mm (12 in) rockets. As a low-cost alternative to more expensive ballistic missiles, the accuracy of SY-400 is increased by adding satellite positioning to correct the inertial navigation (INS) guidance. According to the developer, the accuracy can be further improved if military grade satellite signals are used instead of the civilian GPS. Another feature of SY-400 is that it shares the same launching vehicle and fire control system of BP-12A ballistic missile, thus simplifying logistics.

== Operators ==
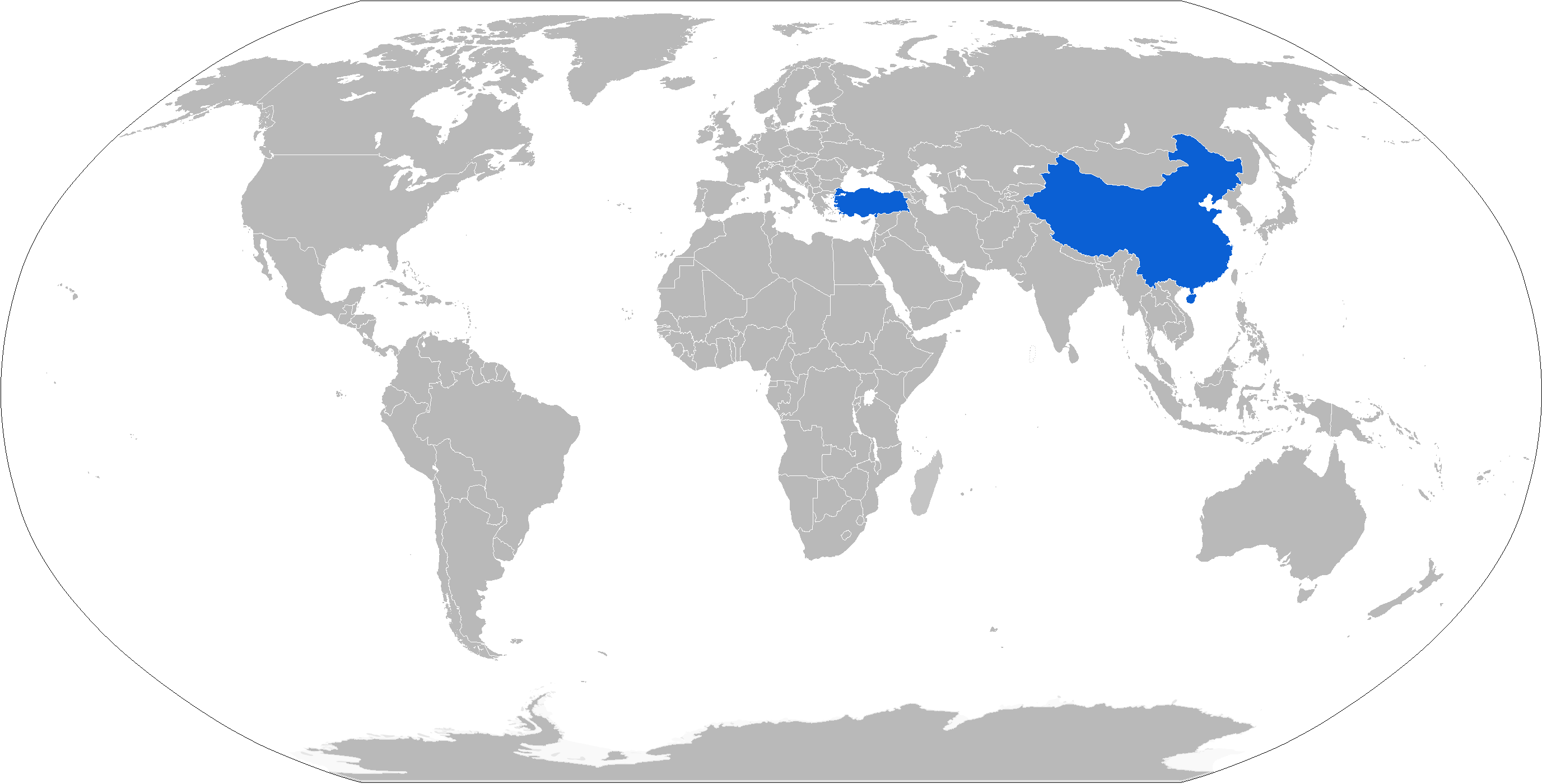
Map with B-611 operators in blue

=== Current operators ===
- China
- Myanmar: BP-12A (SY-400)
- Qatar: 8+ BP-12A (CH-SS-14 mod 2) as of 2022. First publicly displayed at the 2017 Qatari National Day Parade.
- Turkey: Bora and J-600T Yıldırım ballistic missiles developed through technology transfer from China.

== See also ==
- DF-12
- SY-400
