= Bora (missile) =

Turkish tactical ballistic missile

Bora/Khan
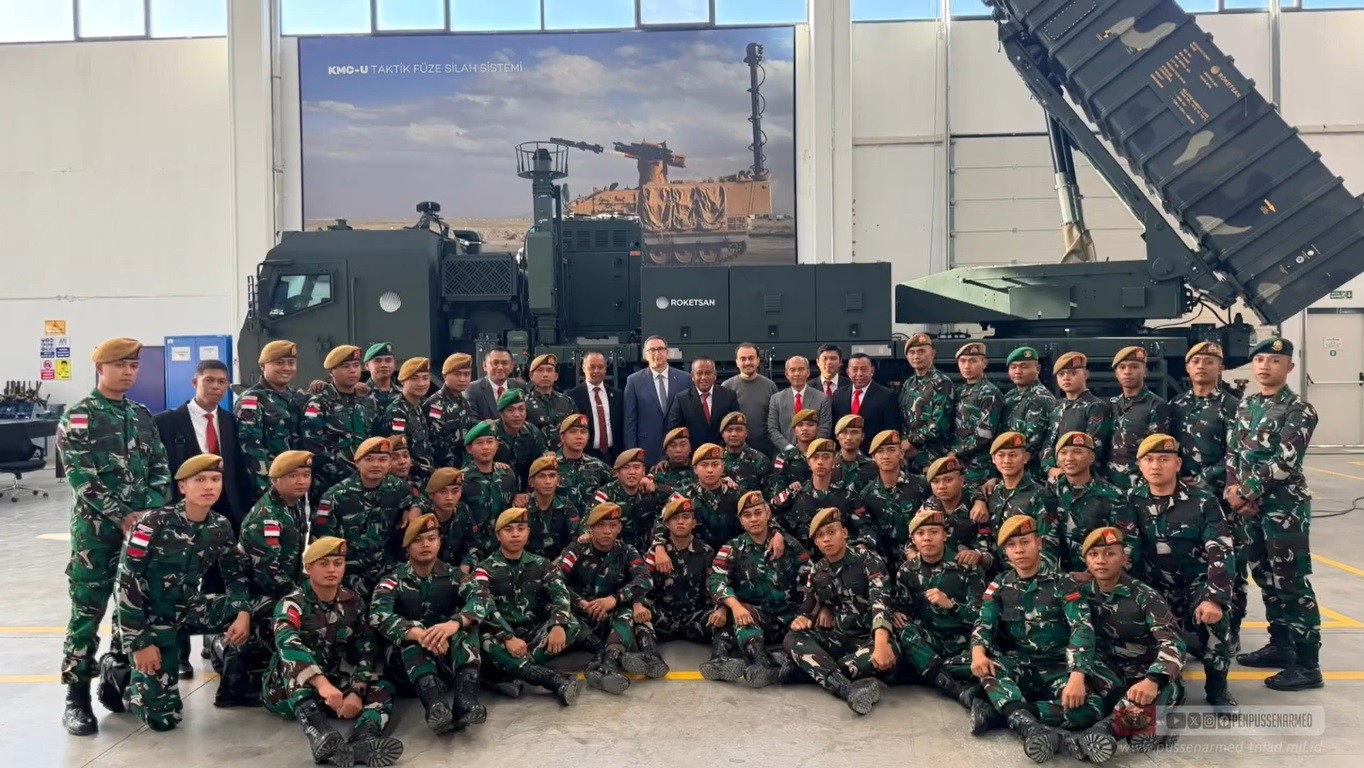
- Indonesian Army delegation with a Khan transporter erector launcher
- Type: Tactical ballistic missile
- Place of origin: Turkey

Service history
- In service: 2018
- Used by: See Users
- Wars: Syrian civil war Syrian conflict (2024-present)

Production history
- Designer: Roketsan
- Designed: 2009
- Manufacturer: Roketsan
- Produced: 2017
- No. built: 900+
- Variants: Bora (domestic); Khan (export)

Specifications
- Mass: 2500 kg
- Length: 8.0 m
- Diameter: 610 mm
- Effective firing range: Bora I 80 km (50 mi) to 280 km (170 mi)
- Warhead: HE or fragmentation
- Warhead weight: 470 kg
- Propellant: Composite solid propellant
- Flight altitude: high altitude
- Maximum speed: Mach 5 for missile
- Guidance system: GPS + GLONASS aided INS / INS only
- Accuracy: ≤10 m CEP
- Launch platform: VOLAT 8x8 (Bora); TATRA 8x8 (Khan)

The Bora is a tactical ballistic missile developed based on the Chinese B-611 and, like the J-600T Yıldırım, is a derivative of the missile development program of China and Turkey. It has 610 mm diameter, a length of 8.0 m, a total weight of 2500 kg with a minimum range of 80 km and maximum range of 280 km. Its export version is called Khan.

== Design ==
The Bora uses GPS+GLONASS aided INS / INS only guidance and its launcher is mounted on a VOLAT 8x8 truck. It carries a 470-kg high-explosive or fragmentation warhead. Accuracy is ≤10 m. While the Khan variant is mounted on a Tatra 8x8 Czech-made military trucks.

== Operational use ==
Bora was tested and entered Turkish service in May 2017. Deliveries were completed in early 2021.

Indonesia announced the procurement of Khan in Indo Defence 2022, with delivery starting in June 2025. The first delivery batch, consisted of four batteries, has been completed in September 2025 and they were assigned to the 18th Field Artillery Battalion in East Kalimantan. The second batch would be delivered in early 2026.

== Variants ==
The Bora-2 version with a longer range is under development.

- Tayfun (missile) - Short Range Ballistic Missile
- Cenk (missile) - Medium Range Ballistic Missile

== Users ==
=== Bora Variant ===
- Syria
- Turkey

=== Khan Variant ===
- Indonesia: Indonesian Army ITBM-600

== Comparable missiles ==
- 9K720 Iskander – (Russia)
- Abdali-I – (Pakistan)
- ATACMS – (United States)
- Çakır (missile) – (Turkey)
- Hatf-I – (Pakistan)
- Hrim-2 – (Ukraine)
- J-600T Yıldırım – (Turkey)
- LORA (missile) – (Israel)
- Nasr (missile) – (Pakistan)
- OTR-21 Tochka – (Soviet Union)
- P-12 – (China)
- Prahaar (missile) – (India)
- Šumadija (multiple rocket launcher) – (Serbia)
- Ure (missile) – (South Korea)
