= Fajr-3 (missile) =

Medium range ballistic missile

- Type: Strategic MRBM

Service history
- In service: 2006–present
- Used by: Aerospace force of Islamic Revolutionary Guard Corps

Production history
- Manufacturer: Aerospace industries organization
- Unit cost: Unknown

Specifications
- Warhead: 3 Conventional warheads
- Engine: Liquid
- Operational range: Unknown (estimated 2,500 km)
- Guidance system: Inertial

The Iranian-made Fajr-3 is believed to be a medium-range ballistic missile with an unknown range (estimated 2,000 km, 1,250 miles).

The Islamic Revolutionary Guard Corps unveiled the missile during the Holy Prophet wargames on 31 March 2006. Islamic Revolutionary Guard Corps Aerospace Force commander Brigade general Hossein Salami announced on television "the successful test-firing of a new missile with greater technical and tactical capabilities than those previously produced". He did not specify the missile's range, which can vary with the payload.

== Operators ==
- Iran

== See also ==
- Military of Iran
- Aerospace Force of the Islamic Revolutionary Guard Corps
- Iranian military industry
- Equipment of the Iranian Army
