= Çakır (missile) =

- Type: Cruise missile
- Place of origin: Turkey

Service history
- Used by: Turkish Armed Forces

Production history
- Manufacturer: Roketsan
- Produced: 9 July 2024 Mass production
- Variants: CR, AS, LIR, SW

Specifications
- Mass: 275 kg (606 lb) air-launched, 350 kg (770 lb) surface-launched
- Length: 3.3 m (130 in) air-launched, 3.8 m (150 in) surface-launched
- Diameter: 275 mm (10.8 in)
- Effective firing range: 150 km (93 mi)
- Warhead: High-explosive, blast-fragmentation, thermobaric
- Warhead weight: 70 kg (70 kg)
- Maximum speed: Mach 0.75 – Mach 0.85 (919–1,040 km/h; 571–647 mph)
- Guidance system: Infrared homing, radio frequency–guided or hybrid, satellite, inertial
- Launch platform: Land, sea, air

Çakır is a new generation cruise missile that can be launched from land, sea and air platforms with a range of more than 150 km (93 mi), designed by Turkish rocket and missile manufacturer Roketsan. It was introduced with the launch of Roketsan Ankara Lalahan facilities on 31 March 2022. On the same day, a video about the missile was shared on the Twitter account of Roketsan.

The targets of Çakır include surface targets, land and surface targets close to the shore, strategic land targets, field targets and caves. It is aimed to make the first firing from the UAV Bayraktar Akıncı towards the end of 2022, and to perform the platform integration in 2023.

The missile, which can act in coordination with different platforms thanks to its network-based data link, allows route update, target change and mission cancellation during flight depending on the user's choice. It also has the ability to dodge while cruising. The missile, which has terrain following technology, can fly close to the water surface. It uses the KTJ-1750 turbojet engine developed by the Turkish defense research company Kale Arge.

== Technical specifications ==
- Length: 3.3 m (11 ft)
- Length incl. booster: 4.1 m (13 ft)
- Diameter: 275 mm (10.8 in)
- Weight: 275 kg (606 lb)
- Weight incl. booster: 330 kg (730 lb)
- Warhead weight: 70 kg (150 lb)
- Warhead type: High Explosive, semi-Armor Piercing Particle Effect, Thermobaric
- Engine: Kale Arge KTJ-1750 Turbojet
- Booster: Solid propellant
- Range: 150 km (93 mi)
- Cruising speed: Mach 0.75 – Mach 0.85 (919–1,040 km/h; 571–647 mph)
- Data link: network-based

== Variants ==
Çakır is a family of weapons as it will be offered in many variants with Infrared homing, radio frequency–guided or hybrid warheads and can be launched from all platforms, namely ships.

Variants of the Çakır family are:

- Çakır CR, Cruise missile
- Çakır AS, Anti-ship missile
- Çakır LIR, Electronic warfare
- Çakır SW, Swarming

== See also ==
- Bora (missile)
- Atmaca
