= Ashoura (missile) =

- Type: Strategic MRBM

Service history
- In service: No information
- Used by: Iran

Production history
- Manufacturer: Iran

Specifications
- Diameter: 2.2 m
- Warhead: One
- Engine: solid fuel
- Operational range: 2000 ~ 2500 km
- Guidance system: inertial

The Ashoura missile is an Iranian ballistic missile or an earlier reporting name for the Sejjil ballistic missile. In November 2007, Iranian Defence Minister Mostafa Mohammad-Najjar announced Iran had built a new missile with a range of 2,000 km: "The Islamic Republic of Iran has never aimed to launch an attack on any country. It will never do so. But if someone wants to invade Iran, they will face a crushing response by the armed forces." He did not say how the missile differed from the Shahab-3, which has a range of 2100 km.

He told the gathering Basij militia during the manoeuvres they were holding that same week that: "The construction of the Ashoura missile, with the range of 2,000 km, is among the accomplishments of the Defence Ministry."

According to Jane's Defence Weekly, the Ashoura represents a major breakthrough in Iranian missile technology. It is the first two-stage MRBM using solid-fueled rocket motors instead of the existing liquid-fueled technology used on the Shahab. This would dramatically reduce the setup and deployment time for the missile and hence, shorten the amount of warning time for the enemy and increase accuracy. Jane's noted that while the development parallels Pakistan's Shaheen-II MRBM there is no evidence to suggest there had been any prior technology exchange or with its other known technology partners such as North Korea, India or China.

The Ashoura was developed by the Shahid Bagheri Industrial Group (SBIG) under the Sanam Industrial Group (Department 140) which is part of the Defense Industries Organization (DIO) of Iran.

The missile is named after the Day of Ashura, an important religious commemoration in Shia Islam.

The Ashura MRBM went an unsuccessful test in November 2007, where the second statge failed to deploy.

In 2008, Jane's reported rumors that the Ashoura missile was renamed the Sejjil missile, and that the two are the same thing. Anthony H. Cordesman, writing for Center for Strategic and International Studies in 2014, also reported that Ashura / Sejjil-2 are the same missile, with Ashura the legacy name.
