= Medium-range ballistic missile =

Class of ballistic missiles defined by range

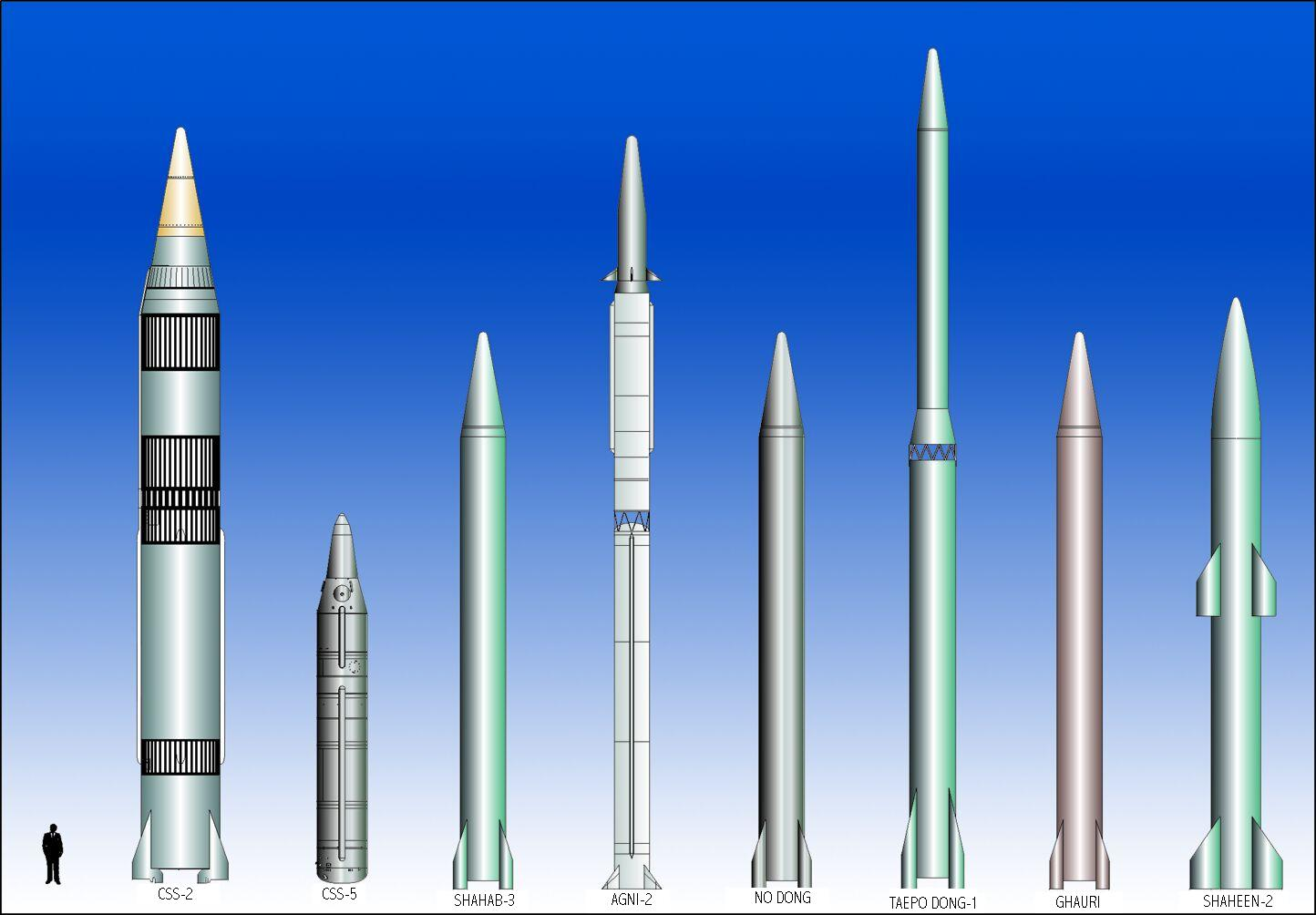
IRBM and MRBM missiles.

A medium-range ballistic missile (MRBM) is a type of ballistic missile with medium range, this last classification depending on the standards of certain organizations. Within the U.S. Department of Defense, a medium-range missile is defined by having a maximum range of between 1,000 and 3,000 kilometres (620 and 1,860 mi). In modern terminology, MRBMs are part of the wider grouping of theatre ballistic missiles, which includes any ballistic missile with a range of less than 3,500 kilometres (2,200 mi). Roughly speaking, MRBM covers the ranges over SRBM (tactical) and under IRBM.

== Specific MRBMs ==
China

- DF-2 – 1,250 kilometres (780 mi)
- DF-16 – 1,000–1,600 kilometres (620–990 mi)
- DF-17 – 1,800–2,500 kilometres (1,100–1,600 mi)
- DF-21 – 1,500–1,700 kilometres (930–1,060 mi)

France

- SSBS S1
- S2 (missile)
- B-Strike Missile Balistique Terrestre (MBT)– 1,000–2,000 kilometres (620–1,240 mi)

India

- Agni-II – 2,000–3,000 kilometres (1,200–1,900 mi)
- Agni-P – 1,000–2,000 kilometres (620–1,240 mi)
- Long Range – Anti Ship Missile >1,500 kilometres (930 mi) (Tested on 16 November 2024)

Iran

- Emad – 1,700 kilometres (1,100 mi)
- Fajr-3 – 2,500 kilometres (1,600 mi)(estimation)
- Fattah – 1,400 kilometres (870 mi)
- Ghadr-110 – 2,000–3,000 kilometres (1,200–1,900 mi)
- Haj Qasem – 1,400 kilometres (870 mi)
- Jihad – 1,000 kilometres (620 mi)
- Kheibar Shekan – 1400 kilometers (900 miles)
- Khorramshahr – 2,000 kilometres (1,200 mi)
- Qassem Bassir – 1200–3000 kilometres (745–1860 mi)
- Rezvan missile – 1,400 kilometres (870 mi)
- Shahab-3 – 1,000–2,000 kilometres (620–1,240 mi)
- Etemad – 1,700 kilometres (1,100 mi)
- Nasrallah – 1,650–1,950 kilometres (1,030–1,210 mi)

Iraq

- Al-Tammuz — 1,200–2,000 kilometres (750–1,240 mi)
- Badr-2000 — 1,000 kilometres (620 mi)

Israel

- Jericho II – 1,300 kilometres (810 mi)

Japan

- HVGP (Block 2) – 2,000–3,000 kilometres (1,200–1,900 mi) (de-facto, under development)

North Korea

- Hwasong-7 – 1,000–1,500 kilometres (620–930 mi)
- Hwasong-9 – 1,000 kilometres (620 mi)
- Pukguksong-1 – 500–2,000 kilometres (310–1,240 mi)
- Pukguksong-2 – 1,200–3,000 kilometres (750–1,860 mi)
- Pukguksong-3 – 2,500–3,000 kilometres (1,600–1,900 mi)

Pakistan

- Ababeel – 2,200 kilometres (1,400 mi)
- Ghauri-I – 1,500 kilometres (930 mi)
- Ghauri-II – 1,800–2,000 kilometres (1,100–1,200 mi)
- Shaheen-II – 2,500 kilometres (1,600 mi)
- Shaheen-III – 2,750 kilometres (1,710 mi)

Soviet Union

- R-5 Pobeda – 1,200 kilometres (750 mi)
- R-12 Dvina – 2,080 kilometres (1,290 mi)
- RT-15 – 2,500 kilometres (1,600 mi)

Turkey

- Cenk – 1,000–2,000 kilometres (620–1,240 mi)
- Tayfun Block 4 – 1,000–1,500 kilometres (620–930 mi)

United States

- OpFires – around 1,609 kilometres (1,000 mi)
- Pershing II – 1,770 kilometres (1,100 mi)
- PGM-19 Jupiter – 2,400 kilometres (1,500 mi)

== See also ==
- Intercontinental ballistic missile (ICBM)
- Intermediate-range ballistic missile (IRBM)
- Short-range ballistic missile (SRBM)
- Theatre ballistic missiles
- Hypersonic cruise missile
