= Nasr (missile) =

Pakistani tactical ballistic missile

Hatf-IX Nasr
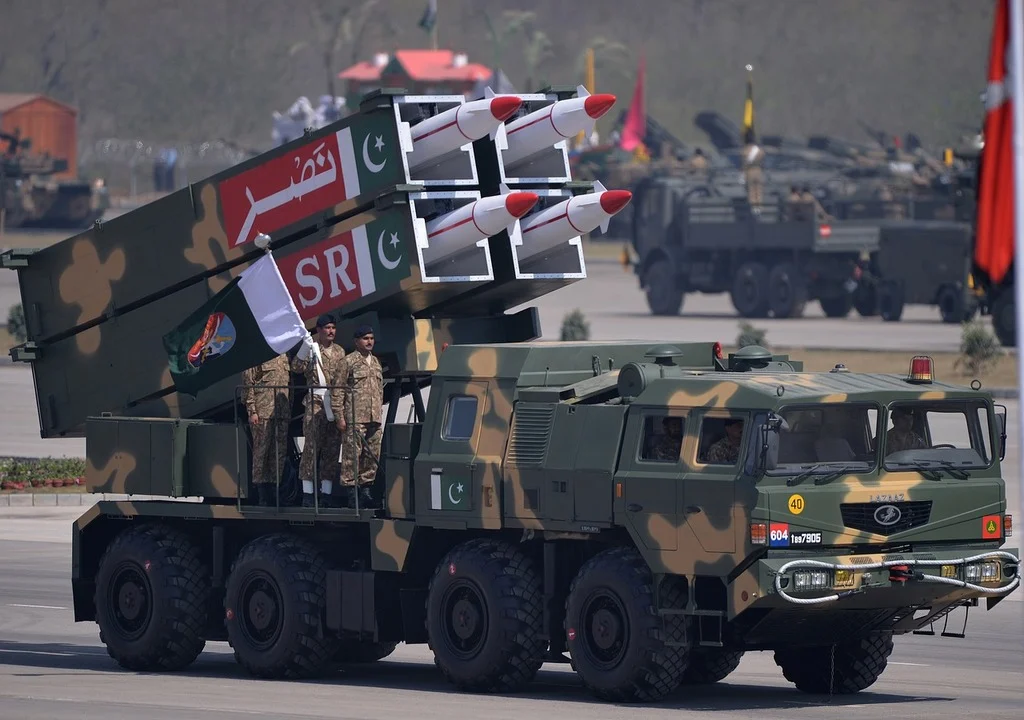
- Pakistan's Hatf-IX Nasr missile at a military parade.
- Type: Short-range ballistic missile (SRBM)
- Place of origin: Pakistan

Service history
- In service: 2013–present
- Used by: Pakistan Army: Army Strategic Forces Command

Production history
- Manufacturer: National Development Complex

Specifications
- Mass: 1,200 kg
- Length: 6.0 m
- Diameter: 0.4 m
- Warhead: 400 kg conventional high explosive, cluster munition or plutonium or uranium nuclear warhead tactical nuclear weapon
- Blast yield: 0.5-5 kilotons
- Engine: Single-stage solid propellant
- Propellant: Solid fuel
- Operational range: 70 km (43.5 mi)
- Accuracy: 10 m
- Launch platform: Transporter erector launcher (TEL)

External media

Images
- Nasr Missile and Launch Vehicle
- Closeup of Nasr Missile

Video
- Video of Nasr Missile Test
- A video clip of the Nasr multi-tube ballistic missile

The Nasr (Urdu: نصر; transl. Victory; military designation: Hatf-IX), is a solid fuel, short-range nuclear-capable ballistic missile system derived from China's WS-2 tactical rocket, and further developed by the National Development Complex (NDC) of Pakistan, currently in service with the Pakistan Army. Its primary function is to deliver tactical nuclear warheads.

The ISPR described the system as a "multi-tube Ballistic Missile" because the launch vehicle can carry multiple missiles. Its existence as a tactical nuclear delivery system was revealed after a test in 2011, and following further testing, its military deployment seems to have occurred in 2013.

== Background ==
According to defence analysts and missile technology experts, the system appears to have been developed as a "low-yield battlefield deterrent" targeted at "mechanized forces like armed brigades and divisions." Therefore, it is believed by analysts that the system is deployed to deter and respond to India's "Cold Start" doctrine. The military ISPR maintains that the Hatf IX was developed to "add deterrence value... at shorter ranges... with high accuracy, shoot and scoot attributes" for "quick response."

Pakistan confirmed that these tactical nuclear weapons are intended to be used against Indian troops on Pakistani soil. According to analysts, if used just inside Pakistani territory, it would counter the cold start doctrine and maximize ionizing radiation exposure while minimizing blast effects which would be more dangerous for the Indian army than for local people as the blast yield is much lower than strategic nuclear weapons.

== Design ==
The Hatf IX Nasr is a ballistic missile derived from the Chinese WS-2 tactical rocket. Nasr carries a sub-kiloton tactical nuclear weapon out to a range of 70 km (43.5 mi). Four missiles are carried on the same Chinese-origin 8x8 transporter erector launcher (TEL) as the Pakistan Army's A-100E 300mm Multiple Launch Rocket System (MLRS), a Chinese version of the BM-30 Smerch.

== Capabilities ==
In test fire footage; the Nasr missile can be seen hitting a target with pinpoint accuracy. However actual figures of the CEP have not been disclosed. Mansoor Ahmed, of Quaid-e-Azam University's Department of Defence and Strategic Studies claimed: "Its in-flight maneuverability is being improved to defeat potential Indian missile defenses against artillery rockets and short-range ballistic missiles, such as the Israeli Iron Dome system." He further went on to say that the system is "fully integrated into the centralized command-and-control structure through round the clock situational awareness in a digitized network centric environment to the decision makers at National Command Center. Nasr is obviously India-specific and the salvo launch capability is a key ability in stopping Indian armored thrusts into Pakistani territory."

== History ==
The missile's existence was first reported after a test-firing on 19-April-2011. A 4-missile salvo fired on 5 October 2013 is believed to have marked the conclusion of the testing programme and the system's likely entry into service. An extended range missile was tested recently.

== See also ==
Similar missiles

- Prahaar (missile) – (India)
- MGR-1 Honest John – (United States)
- KN-25 – (North Korea)
