= J-600T Yıldırım =

Turkish theater ballistic missile

J-600T Thunderbolt
- Type: Theater ballistic missile Short-range ballistic missile
- Place of origin: Turkey

Service history
- In service: 2001 – present
- Used by: Turkish Army

Production history
- Designer: Roketsan
- Manufacturer: Roketsan
- Produced: 1998

Specifications
- Mass: 2100 kg
- Length: 6.10 m
- Diameter: 600 mm
- Warhead: 480 kg TNT+RDX conventional warhead
- Detonation mechanism: Proximity / Impact
- Engine: Single-stage solid propellant
- Propellant: HTPB-based composite solid propellant
- Operational range: Yıldırım I: 150 km Yıldırım II: 300 km Yildirim III:900 km
- Maximum speed: Supersonic
- Guidance system: Inertial and Optical guidance systems
- Launch platform: F-600T (based on MAN 26.372 6x6)

J-600T Yıldırım (Thunderbolt) is a short-range ballistic missile developed by Roketsan based on the Chinese B-611, it is designed to attack high-value targets such as enemy air defence installations, C3I centers, logistics and infrastructure facilities as well as providing fire support to friendly artillery by expanding the area of effect.

== History ==
Turkey's cooperation with China and Pakistan for the joint development of ballistic missiles began in the late 1970s and early 1980s. The story of Project J, as well as Project Kasırga which preceded it, goes back to the first half of the 1990s, when negotiations for the technology transfer and production under license in Turkey of the American M270 MLRS artillery rocket system failed. Turkey decided to seek for other alternatives, mainly focusing on full sovereignty over critical technologies in order to establish a self-sufficient national infrastructure for the design and development of guided missiles. After signing a contract for the licensed production of the Chinese WS-1A and WS-1B rockets under the name of Kasırga in 1997, a similar contract was signed with CPMIEC (Chinese Precision Machinery Import and Export Corporation) for the Chinese B-611 SRBM system in 1998, covering the licensed production of a battery of B-611 with more than 200 missiles, at a reported cost of US$300,000,000.

The J-600T design is based on the B-611 SRBM developed by China Precision Machinery Import-Export Corporation (CPMIEC) as a low cost tactical missile system, with a range of up to 250 km in improved versions such as the B-611M, and as a replacement for the M-11 (CSS-7 and DF-11) missiles in Chinese inventory. CPMIEC officials have confirmed at the IDEF 2007 military fair in Ankara that B-611M, the improved version of B-611, was not a part of the Sino-Turkish cooperation program.

Turkey's ROKETSAN has been assigned with the task of improving the range, performance and design of the J-600T, and is conducting studies on alternatives such as a sealed pod launcher box design, improved propellant, improved GCU and different types of warhead configurations.

Roketsan is reportedly working on an improved version of J-600T, details of which are highly speculative for the moment. Given that the system was first revealed to the public more than 7 years of its introduction to service, it can be expected that information about the improved version, if there is any, is going to remain secret for some time.

== Characteristics ==
The Yıldırım system is composed of two units: The J-600T SRBM and the F-600T launcher vehicle, which is based on the MAN 26.372 6x6 truck, manufactured in Turkey. The same vehicle is also used for the Turkish-built T-122 Sakarya and T-300 Kasırga MBRL (Multi Barrel Rocket Launcher, or MLRS) systems, providing advantage in logistics. Each F-600T carries one J-600T on an open rail-type launcher and can be prepared for launch in less than 25 minutes, with the vehicle ready to move again in less than 5 minutes. The missile is loaded onto the F-600T vehicle by a crane from a reloading vehicle, again a MAN 26.372 6x6 truck.

The missile's flight is controlled by an INS (Inertial Navigation System) which feeds trajectory correction command inputs to the four moving wings at the nozzle section. The trajectory data is loaded onto the missile's Guidance & Control Unit (GCU) (FCS) on board the F-600T vehicle before the launch. The FCS in F-600T is also supported by BAIKS (Batarya Atış İdare Kompüter Sistemi, eng: Battery Fire Control Computer System) and TOMES (Topçu Meteoroloji Sistemi, eng: Artillery Meteorology System). It is reported that the missile can also be upgraded with a GPS/INS GCU.

Each J-600T Yıldırım battery consists of:

- 1 x Battery Command & Control Vehicle
- 2 x Firing Team Command and Control Vehicles
- 6 x F-600T Launcher Vehicles
- 7 x F-600T Reload - Resupply Vehicles
- 1 x Maintenance Vehicle

== Operation ==
The J-600T has been operational with the Turkish Army since 2001, but it was first revealed to the public six years later, during the Victory Day (Zafer Bayramı) parade in Ankara, on August 30, 2007. The TRT (Turkish Radio and Television Corporation) commentator announced the system as the "Yıldırım missile system." During this parade and the following two parades in the same year, both the launchers and the reloading vehicles were displayed to the public. The Yıldırım system was also reported to the United Nations Register of Conventional Arms by Turkey in March 2007.

== Specifications ==
The J-600T Yıldırım, developed and manufactured by ROKETSAN, has two versions that are currently in the inventory of the Turkish Armed Forces:

- J-600T Yıldırım I SRBM (150 km range)
- J-600T Yıldırım II SRBM (300 km range)
- J-600T Yıldırım III SRBM (900 km range)

== See also ==
- Yıldırımhan

== References and notes ==
- Jane's Strategic Weapon Systems. October 27, 2011
- .: TÜBİTAK-SAGE/Proje-Ürünler :.
- (in Turkish) "J" doping to army, Utku Çakırözer, Milliyet, 14 January 2002
- Devlet sırrı olarak saklanıyor!, 7 October 2015
