= Strategic Plans Division Force =

Pakistan's law enforcement agency responsible for protection of special nuclear materials

SPD Force
- عسکری حکمتِ عملی ڈیوژن فورس
- Founded: 2 February 2000 (26 years ago)
- Country: Pakistan
- Branch: National Command Authority
- Role: Strategic/Protection of special nuclear materials
- Size: 25,000+
- Part of: Strategic Plans Division
- Garrison/HQ: Joint Staff HQ in Rawalpindi
- Nickname: SPDF

Commanders
- Director-General: Lt-Gen. Yusuf Jamal

The Strategic Plans Division Force (reporting name:SPD Force) is a paramilitary unit responsible for safeguarding Pakistan's nuclear arsenal, including both tactical and strategic nuclear weapons, as well as the security of nuclear facilities where these weapons and materials are produced and stored.

It is the security branch of the Strategic Plans Division (SPD) which in turn acts as the certification secretariat of National Command Authority.

== Historical background and role ==
The Strategic Plans Division Force is paramilitary force that is responsible for providing provision of security to country's strategic sites and protecting the nuclear materials. It's a heavily armed force, which is reflective of the anticipated capabilities of an adversary likely to attempt an assault against nuclear material-holding sites.

The leadership appointment of the Strategic Plans Division Force comes directly from Pakistan Army. Designated as a Director-General Security, its a two-star rank general officer who reports directly to Director General of the Strategic Plans Division. There are four security directorates for each strategic organization and each directorate is led by Brigadier.

Initially, the active-duty members of the Pakistan Armed Forces provided the security of the agency but the agency now has started hiring its own personnel. At start, these recruits were trained at Pakistan Army's training centers but since 2012 SPD force has been training these recruits in its own academy known as Pakistan's Centre of Excellence for Nuclear Security (PCENS) located in Chakri near Rawalpindi. This training facility is modeled on US National Nuclear Security Administration's Federal Protective Forces academy.

== Special Response Force ==
Special Response Force (SRF) is the special forces unit of SPD Force. SRF is based on training techniques of SSG and has retired SSG commandos as training staff.

== Weapons ==
SPD Force's primary weapons are G3, Type 56 and Type 81 assault rifles.

== See also ==
- Strategic Plans Division
