= Nuclear Command Authority =

Nuclear Command Authority may refer to:

- Nuclear Command Authority (India), the authority responsible for command, control and operational decisions regarding India's nuclear weapons programme
- National Command Authority (Pakistan), the command that oversees the deployment, research and development, and operational command and control of Pakistan's nuclear arsenal
- National Command Authority (United States)
