= Nadeem Zaki =

Pakistani military person

Nadeem Zaki Manj HI(M)

Director General Strategic Plans Division
- In office November 2019 – October 2022
- Preceded by: Sarfraz Sattar
- Succeeded by: Yusuf Jamal

Commander I Corps Mangla
- In office October 2018 – November 2019
- Preceded by: Azhar Saleh Abbasi
- Succeeded by: Shaheen Mazhar Mehmood

Personal details
- Education: Pakistan Military Academy; Command and Staff College Quetta

Military service
- Allegiance: Pakistan
- Branch: Pakistan Army
- Service years: 1987–2022
- Rank: Lieutenant General
- Unit: Pakistan Armoured Corps
- Commands: GOC – 33 Infantry Division; DG – Military Intelligence; Commander – I Corps Mangla; DG – Strategic Plans Division
- Awards: Hilal-i-Imtiaz

Nadeem Zaki Manj is a retired lieutenant general of the Pakistan Army who last served as Director General of the Strategic Plans Division.

== Military career ==
Manj attended the Homs Military Academy and was commissioned into the Pakistan Armoured Corps via the 75th PMA Long Course.

In 2015, Manj was promoted to the rank of major general and appointed Director General of Military Intelligence (DGMI). He subsequently served as General Officer Commanding of the 33 Infantry Division.

In 2018, Manj was promoted to lieutenant general and appointed Commander of I Corps Mangla, one of the Pakistan Army's principal strike formations.

In November 2019, he was appointed Director General of the Strategic Plans Division (SPD). During his tenure, Pakistan conducted a series of missile tests, including of the Shaheen-I ballistic missile variant, the Ghaznavi missile, the Shaheen-III, and an enhanced variant of a cruise missile. Manj also held discussions on nuclear policy with senior government officials, including then prime minister Imran Khan and the Foreign Minister.

Manj retired from active military service in October 2022.
