= National Command Authority (Pakistan) =

Federal agency of the Government of Pakistan

National Command Authority (NCA)
- مقتدرہِ قومی کمان

Agency overview
- Formed: 2 February 2000 (26 years ago)
- Headquarters: Pakistan Secretariat in Islamabad
- Annual budget: FY-26 federal budget
- Agency executives: Lt-Gen. Yusuf Jamal Secretary of National Command Authority; Gen. Syed Aamer Raza Commander of National Strategic Command
- Parent agency: Ministry of Defence
- Key document: The National Command Authority Act, 2010

The National Command Authority (NCA) is an independent federal agency responsible for safeguarding the national security of Pakistan through policy formation, force posturing, command, control, and operational decisions-making regarding Pakistan's nuclear weapons program.

With the Prime Minister of Pakistan as its chairperson, the NCA maintains and enhances the safety control and security operational effectiveness of Pakistan's nuclear weapons stockpile, development plans, works on nuclear arms controls, finances, and nuclear security-related issues.

Established in 2000 along with its certification secretariat, the Strategic Plans Division, the NCA was a direct successor to the Air Force Strategic Command, which was established by the then-Chief of Air Staff Air Chief Marshal Anwar Shamim in 1983.

== Overview ==
After the nuclear weapons testings conducted in Ras Koh Range in 1998, the Pakistani national security strategists began discussing the idea towards a robust command and control oversight which would validate the operational deterrent. The idea received more support since the secretive research and development complexes simultaneously worked on variety of weapon designs, often engage in intense competition and on overlapping issues. The Joint Staff Headquarters (JS HQ) did established the directorates at the Army GHQ to provide safe control and command from being exploitation, politicisation, and infiltration from the regional adversaries to sabotage the nuclear weapons program.

In April 1999, Gen. Pervez Musharraf, then-Chairman joint chiefs and then-army chief, supported the proposal and submitted the overall report to the Prime Minister Nawaz Sharif as a step towards an effective operational deterrent.

On 3 February 2000, the National Command Authority (NCA) was created through an executive action with the establishment of the National Security Council (NSC). The new federal agency was a result of amalgamating the previous cabinet-level Employment Control Committee (ECC) and the Development Control Committee (DCC) with the establishment of the strategic directorate– the Strategic Plans Division (SPD). The first secretary of National Command Authority was appointed when Lieutenant-General Khalid Kidwai was also named as director-general of the Strategic Plans Division.

In 2010, the National Command Authority's mandate was approved through a parliamentary legislation with the Prime Minister of Pakistan to act its Chief Executive (or Chairman), assisted by the principle civilian cabinet ministers of foreign affairs, defense, finance, and interior as the ex officio members.

== Mission, mandate and operation ==
The National Command Authority (NCA) has mandated by the act of parliament to ensure its mission and operations regarding the national security.

- To manage Pakistan's nuclear weapons stockpile.
- To reduce regional danger from weapons of mass destruction and to promote nuclear safety and international nonproliferation.
- To authorize and provide guidance on undertaking of scientific and technological work; and to ensure the safe and reliable stockpile operations of the Strategic Forces.

=== Defense programs ===
The National Command Authority is mandate to provide consultancy to maintain the safety, security and effectiveness of the Pakistan's nuclear weapons stockpile. The NCA works on maintaining the existing nuclear deterrent by funding of the science experiments, engineering audits, and computer simulation of hydrodynamics events at its weapons development complexes while helping in guiding new weapons programs as required by the Ministry of Defense of Pakistan.

=== Nonproliferation ===
In the wake of controversies involving S. B. Mahmood (2001) and A. Q. Khan (2005), the two senior scientists in Pakistan's weapons program, the National Command Authority's role in nuclear nonproliferation became central and primary objective. Since then, the NCA's mission has evolved into rapidly upgrading its personnel security oversight, clearance levels, and export control of the nuclear technology.

The NCA works with the international partners and the federal agencies to discover, protect, and or dispose of radiological and nuclear materials. Its partnership with the American National Nuclear Security Administration (NNSA) has been linked to export control of nuclear technology, nuclear security and nuclear enterprise safety.

== Organizational structure ==
The NCA consists of the organizational structure as provided by the known-source below:

- Prime Minister of Pakistan (Chairman)
  - Employment Control (Civilian oversight)
    - Minister of Foreign Affairs
    - Minister of Internal Affairs
    - Minister of Defense
    - Minister of Finance
    - Minister of Energy
    - National Security Advisor
    - Leader of the Opposition
    - By Invitation
  - Development Control (Military planning)
    - Chief of Defence Forces
    - Chief of the Army Staff
    - Chief of the Naval Staff
    - Chief of the Air Staff
    - Secretary of the National Command Authority
    - By Invitation
  - Operational Control (Technical, Training & Administration)
    - Commander, National Strategic Command
    - Commander, Air Force Strategic Command
    - Commander, Army Strategic Forces Command
    - Commander, Naval Strategic Forces Command
    - Director-General, SUPARCO

Source: Khan, F. (7 November 2012). Eating Grass: The Making of Pakistani bomb. Stanford University Press. pp. 335–336. ISBN 0804784809.

== Subordinate agencies ==
=== Strategic Plans Division ===
The Strategic Plans Division (SPD) is a division that works on engineering audits and viability certification of the nuclear weapons that is the essence for validating the operational full spectrum nuclear deterrent. The SPD follows the conventional military chain of command but integrated with the nuclear warfare strategy by working towards enabling the nuclear triad with the establishment of the three-tier strategic force commands. The SPD creates new weapons programs as required by the Pakistan's Ministry of Defense (MoD).

The NCA issues directives under the consultancy and after the nuclear weapons stockpile engineering audits certified by the Strategic Plans Division (SPD). The SPD is a military directorate whose leadership comes directly as an external billet appointments from the Army GHQ at the request of the JS HQ.

In 1990, the Combat Development Directorate was created by the Pakistan Army, with Major-General Ziauddin Butt becoming its first director-general. The directorate concerning with nuclear weapons development and delivery mechanism reported directly to army chief or the chief of general staff. The combat development directorate functioned until 1998 with Lieutenant-General Zulfikar Ali Khan its final director when the Strategic Plans Division was created as a secretariat of the National Command Authority in 2000.

As of 2022, Lieutenant-General Yusuf Jamal is serving as the director-general of the Strategic Plans Division as well as serving as in capacity of Secretary of NCA. To address the physical security of the nuclear weapons, the SPD operates its own paramilitary unit, which has received training in past from the United States Department of Energy's Federal Protective Forces.

Directors-Generals of Strategic Plans Division
Name	Start of Term	End of Term	President(s) served under	Notes
Major-General Ziauddin Butt	1990	1993	Ghulam Ishaq Khan	As Combat Development Directorate
Lieutenant-General Zulfikar Ali Khan	1993	2001	Farooq Leghari; Rafiq Tarrar	As Combat Development Directorate
Lieutenant-General Khalid Kidwai	February 2000	December 2013	Pervez Musharraf; Asif Ali Zardari	Retired in 2010. Continued role as civilian
Lieutenant-General Zubair Hyatt	December 2013	April 2015	Mamnoon Hussain	Later appointed as Chairman joint chiefs.
Lieutenant-General Mazhar Jamil	April 2015	September 2017	Mamnoon Hussain	
Lieutenant-General Sarfraz Sattar	September 2017	November 2019	Mamnoon Hussain; Arif Alvi	
Lieutenant-General Nadeem Zaki	November 2019	October 2022	Arif Alvi	
Lieutenant-General Yusuf Jamal	October 2022	Present	Asif Ali Zardari	

=== National Strategic Command ===
In 2025, National Strategic Command came into existence headed by four star general in order to centralize operational control of strategic land-, sea-, and air-based nuclear assets. Since 27th July 2026, Syed Aamer Raza assumes office as first Commander of National Strategic Command.

Commander of National Strategic Command
Name	Start of Term	End of Term	President(s) served under	Notes
General Syed Aamer Raza	July 2026	present	Asif Ali Zardari	

== See also ==
- Pakistan and weapons of mass destruction
