= Yusuf Jamal =

Pakistani military person

- Alma mater: Pakistan Military Academy
- Military career
- Allegiance: Pakistan
- Branch: Pakistan Army
- Service years: 1990–present
- Rank: Lieutenant general
- Unit: 35 Frontier Forces
- Commands: Director general of Strategic Plans Division Force; Director general of National Logistics Cell
- Awards: Hilal-i-Imtiaz

Yusuf Jamal, HI(M) is a three star general of the Pakistan Army who is the incumbent director general of the Strategic Plans Division Force.

== Military career ==
Jamal was commissioned in the 35 Frontier Force Regiment in 1990. He has served in various capacities. As a major general, he served as director general of National Logistics Cell. He was awarded the Hilal-i-Imtiaz in 2021.

Jamal's rank was elevated to lieutenant general in 2022 and he assumed the office of director general, Strategic Plans Division Force. As DG SPDF, his primary task is to keep the nuclear arsenal of Pakistan safe.
