= Hwasong-6 =

Short-range ballistic missile

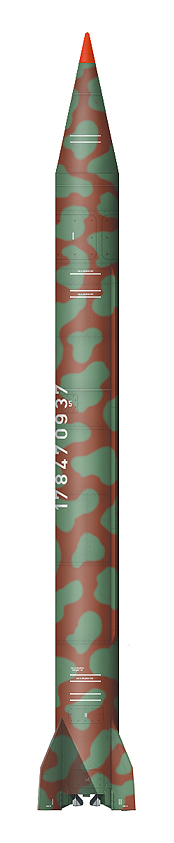
- Artist rendition of the missile
- Type: Short range ballistic missile
- Place of origin: North Korea

Service history
- In service: 1992−Present
- Used by: See operators
- Wars: Yemeni civil war (2014–present)

Production history
- Produced: 1990−2000?
- Variants: See variants

Specifications
- Length: 10.94 m (35.9 ft)
- Diameter: 88 cm (35 in)
- Maximum firing range: 500–550 km (310–340 mi)
- Warhead: HE, cluster munition
- Warhead weight: 700–770 kg (1,540–1,700 lb)
- Accuracy: 700–1,000 m (770–1,090 yd) CEP
- Launch platform: MAZ-543 TEL

The Hwasong-6 (Korean: 《화성-6》형; lit. 'Mars Type 6') is a North Korean tactical ballistic missile. It is derived from the Hwasong-5, itself a derivative of the Soviet R-17 Elbrus. It carries the NATO reporting name Scud.

== History ==
Work on an extended-range version of the Hwasong-5 began in North Korea around 1984, and with only relatively minor modifications, a new type was produced from 1989, designated Hwasong-6 ("Scud Mod. C" or "Scud-C"). It was first tested in June 1990, and entered full-scale production the same year, or in 1991. It is likely out of production. The North Koreans would later use their acquired know-how to produce domestic copies of the Scud-B to create a larger missile, the Hwasong-7.

To increase range over its predecessor, the Hwasong-6 payload has been decreased to 770 kg (1,700 lb) and the length of the rocket body extended to increase the propellant by 25%; accuracy is 700–1,000 m (2,300–3,300 ft) circular error probability (CEP). Such range is sufficient to strike targets as far away as western Japan. Its dimensions are identical to the original Hwasong-5. Due to difficulties in procuring MAZ-543 TELs, mobile launchers were produced in North Korea. By 1999, North Korea was estimated to have produced 600 to 1,000 Hwasong-6 missiles, of which 25 had been launched in tests, 300 to 500 had been exported, and 300 to 600 were in service with the Korean People's Army.

The Hwasong-6 is armed with a high-explosive (HE) fragmentation or cluster warhead, but is believed to be capable of carrying a nuclear, chemical, or biological warhead.

Before the 2015 Houthi takeover in Yemen, the country didn't have a domestic missile program, and had only a small stockpile of Soviet-made Scud-B and North Korean Hwasong-6 missiles bought in the 1980s and 1990s. These were used against the pro-Hadi forces in the summer of that year. Since then, the Houthis have used domestically produced ballistic missiles with Iranian assistance.

== Variants ==
=== Iran ===
- Shahab-2

=== North Korea ===
- KN-18

=== Yemen ===
- Burkan-2

== Export ==
The Hwasong-6 was exported to Iran, where it is designated as the Shahab-2, to Syria, where it is manufactured under licence with Chinese assistance and to Yemen. Myanmar also imported Hwasong-6 ballistic missiles in 2009. About 25 Hwasong-6 ballistic missiles were purchased by Vietnam from North Korea in 1997. In 1995, Libya purchased 5 Hwasong-6 missiles from North Korea, however they were never tested or deployed, and planned local production was cancelled in 2003 with the disarmament of Libya.

== Operators ==
=== Current ===
- Egypt − Reportedly purchased in 1996, unconfirmed
- Iran − Produced locally as the Shahab-2. Status uncertain
- Myanmar − Reported
- North Korea − 30+ Hwasong 5/6 launchers as of 2024
- Syria − Shahab-2
- Vietnam − reportedly purchased in 1998

=== Non-state ===
- Hezbollah − Shahab-2 (reported)

=== Former ===
- Libya
- Yemen − Pre-war stocks depleted during the Yemeni civil war (2014–present). Most were converted into Burkan missiles by the Houthis

== See also ==
- Hwasong-5 – (North Korea)
- R-11 Zemlya – (Soviet Union)
- R-17 Elbrus – (Soviet Union)
- Scud missile – (Soviet Union)
- Ghaznavi – (Pakistan)
- Abdali-I – (Pakistan)
- Shaheen-I – (Pakistan)
- J-600T Yıldırım – (Turkey)
- SOM – (Turkey)
- Bora – (Turkey)
- Fateh-313 – (Iran)
- Qiam 1 – (Iran)
- al-Husayn – (Iraq)
- Nasr – (Pakistan)
- Zelzal – (Iran)
- Tondar-69 – (Iran)
- Burkan-1 – (Yemen)

== Bibliography ==
- Center for Energy and Security Studies; The International Institute for Strategic Studies (14 July 2021). DPRK Strategic Capabilities and Security on the Korean Peninsula: Looking Ahead (PDF).
- International Institute for Strategic Studies (12 February 2024). "Chapter Five: Asia". The Military Balance. 124 (1). Taylor & Francis: 218–327. doi:10.1080/04597222.2024.2298593. ISSN 0459-7222.
- International Institute for Strategic Studies (12 February 2024a). "Chapter Six: Middle East and North Africa". The Military Balance. 124 (1). Taylor & Francis: 328–395. doi:10.1080/04597222.2024.2298594. ISSN 0459-7222.
- Kang, Jungmin (2013). Assessment of the Nuclear Programs of Iran and North Korea. Springer Science & Business Media. ISBN 978-94-007-6019-6.
- Samaan, Jean-Loup (2023). New Military Strategies in the Gulf: The Mirage of Autonomy in Saudi Arabia, the UAE and Qatar. Bloomsbury Publishing. ISBN 978-0-7556-5073-6.
- Williams, Ian; Shaikh, Shaan (2020). "Houthi Missile Sources". The Missile War in Yemen. Center for Strategic and International Studies (CSIS): 15–19.
- Williams, Ian; Shaikh, Shaan (2020a). "Appendix: The Houthi Missile Arsenal". The Missile War in Yemen. Center for Strategic and International Studies (CSIS): 34–52.
- Zaloga, Steven J. (2013). Scud Ballistic Missile and Launch Systems 1955–2005. Bloomsbury Publishing. ISBN 978-1-4728-0306-1.
