= R-11 Zemlya =

Soviet tactical ballistic missile

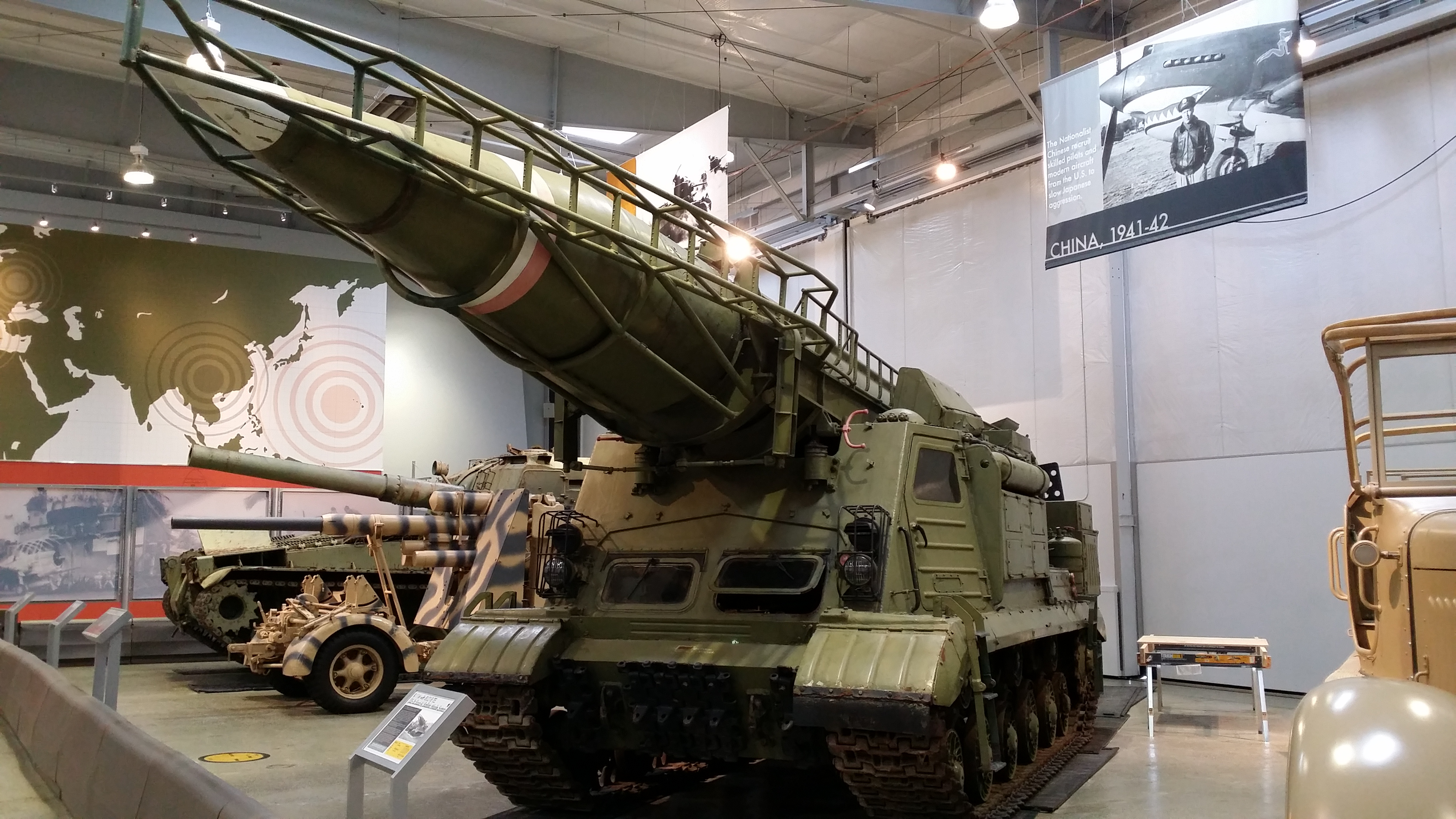
- R-11M missile on an 8U218 Transport-Erector-Launcher
- Type: Short-range ballistic missile
- Place of origin: Soviet Union

Service history
- In service: 1956–1978

Production history
- Produced: 1956–1962

Specifications
- Mass: 5.4 tonnes
- Length: 10.604 m
- Diameter: 880 mm
- Warhead: High explosive, nuclear

The R-11 Zemlya (Russian: Р-11 Земля, lit. 'Earth'), GRAU index 8A61 was a Soviet tactical ballistic missile. It is also known by its NATO reporting name SS-1b Scud-A. It was the first of several similar Soviet missiles to be given the reporting name Scud. Variant R-11M was accepted into service, with GRAU index 9K51 (9К51).

== Origin ==
The R-11 originated from a 1951 requirement for a ballistic missile with similar performance to the German V-2 rocket, but half its size. With the Wasserfall, an anti-aircraft version of the V-2, as a model, the R-11 was developed by engineer Victor Makeev, who was then working in OKB-1, headed by Sergey Korolyov. The two men agreed on the use of RG-1 as the fuel, but disagreed over which oxidizer to use, with Korolev favouring liquid oxygen, and Makeev advocating the use of a storable but toxic oxidizer. Makeev's version, that first flew on 18 April 1953, was fitted with an Isayev engine using RG-1 and nitric acid. On 13 December 1953, a production order was passed with SKB-385 in Zlatoust, a factory dedicated to producing long-range rockets. In June 1955, Makeev was appointed chief designer of the SKB-385 to oversee the programme and, in July, the R-11 was formally accepted into military service. The definitive R-11M, designed to carry a nuclear warhead, was accepted officially into service on 1 April 1958. The launch system received the GRAU index 9K51, the rocket itself 8K11, and the launcher was initially designated 2U218 but later changed to 8U218.

== Systems specification ==
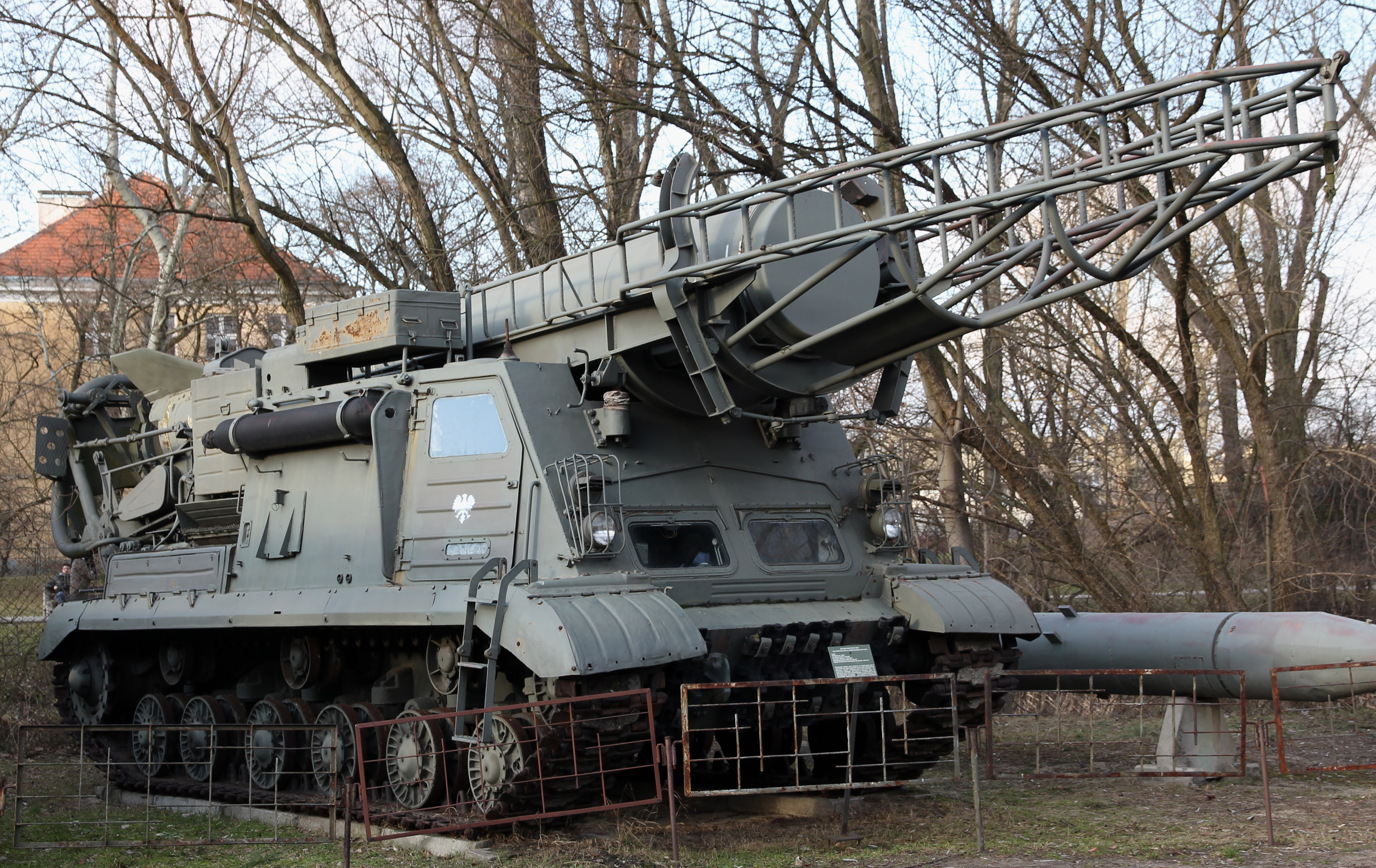
8U218 launcher (rocket without a warhead)

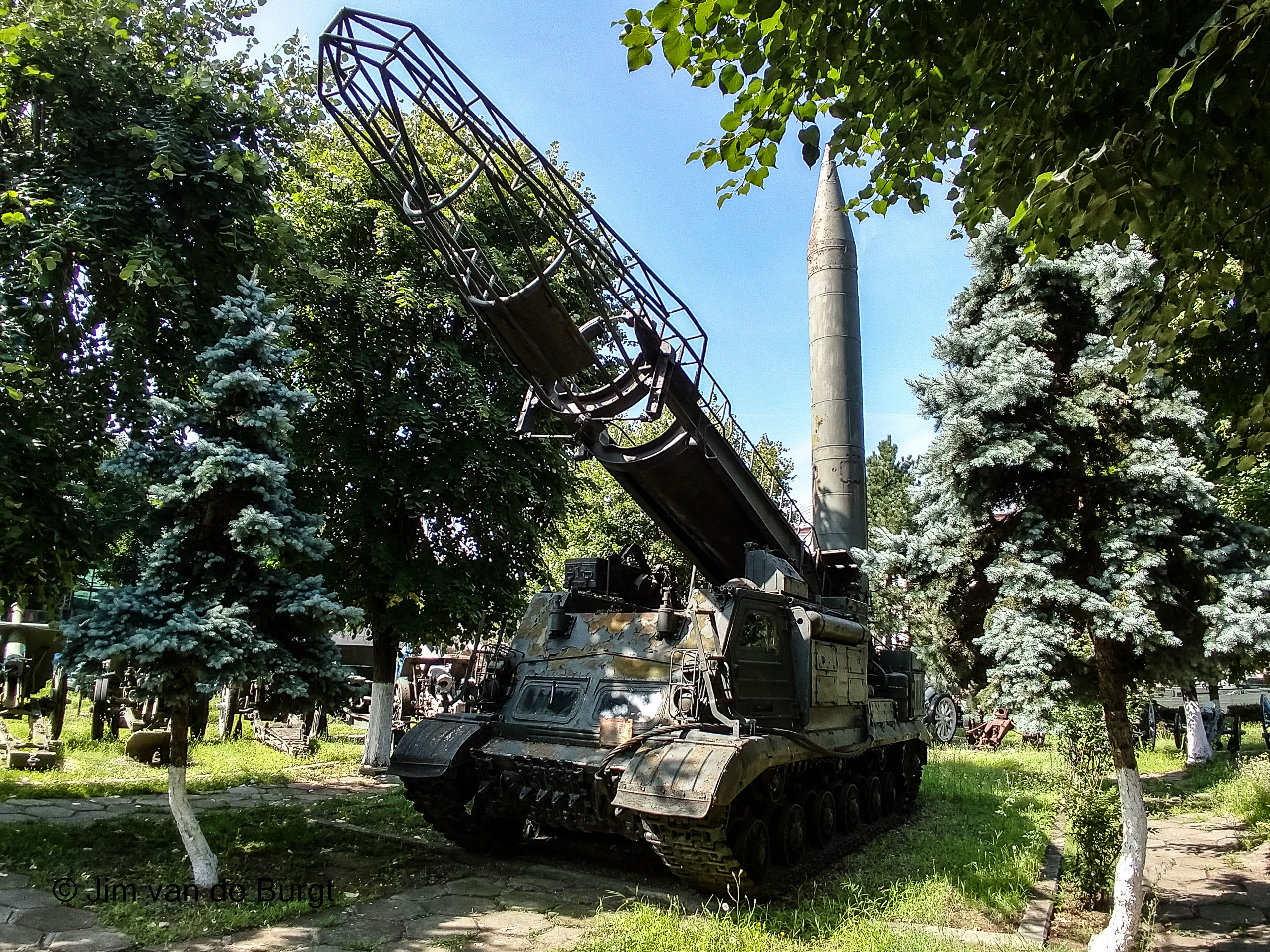
8U218 with R-11 missile in firing position

Like the V-2, the R-11 relied on inertial guidance, and its flight was controlled by four graphite vanes in the engine exhaust, that were active only while the motor was burning. The R-11M had a maximum range of 270 km (170 mi), but when carrying a nuclear warhead, this was reduced to 170 km (110 mi), hence an alternative designation R-170. At maximum range, it was found to have an average range error of 1.19 km (0.74 mi) and an azimuth error of 660 m (0.41 mi). It was used as a mobile nuclear strike vector, giving the Soviet Army the ability to hit European targets from forward areas. To give the system sufficient mobility on the battlefield, the R-11 was mounted on a transporter erector launcher with a chassis derived from the ISU-152K, which was designated 8U218. The main payload was a nuclear warhead with an estimated yield of 10, 20 or 40 kilotons. There was also HE-Frag warhead 9N33 with 535 kg (1,179 lb) of explosive.

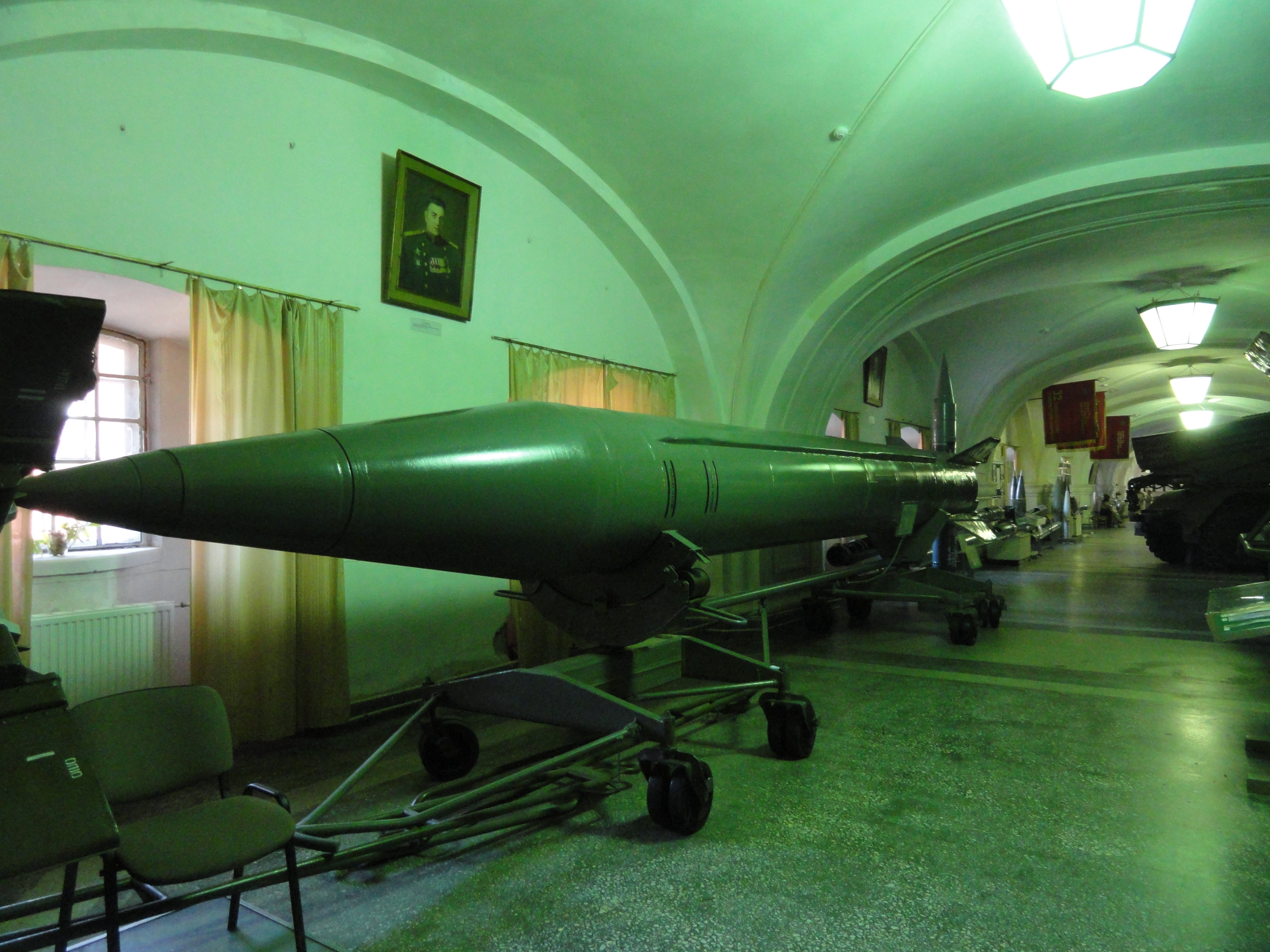
R-11FM in Military Historical Museum of Artillery, Engineers and Signal Corps

== Naval variant ==
A naval variant, the R-11FM was first tested at Kapustin Yar in February 1955, and was first launched from a converted Project 611 (Zulu class) submarine in September of the same year. While the initial design was done by Korolev's OKB-1, the programme was transferred to Makeyev's SKB-385 in August 1955. It became operational in 1959 as the D-1 launch system, the world's first submarine-launched ballistic missile (SLBM), and was deployed onboard Project 611 and Project 629 (Golf Class) submarines, until its replacement by the R-13 in 1961 (SS-N-4) and the R-21 (SS-N-5) in 1963. During its service, 77 launches were conducted, of which 59 were successful. The success of the R-11FM established Makeev as the main designer of submarine-launched weapons for the Soviet Armed Forces, and the R-11FM served with the first generation SLBM submarine units of the Soviet Navy.

== Users ==
- Soviet Union
- Polish People's Republic
- Socialist Republic of Romania

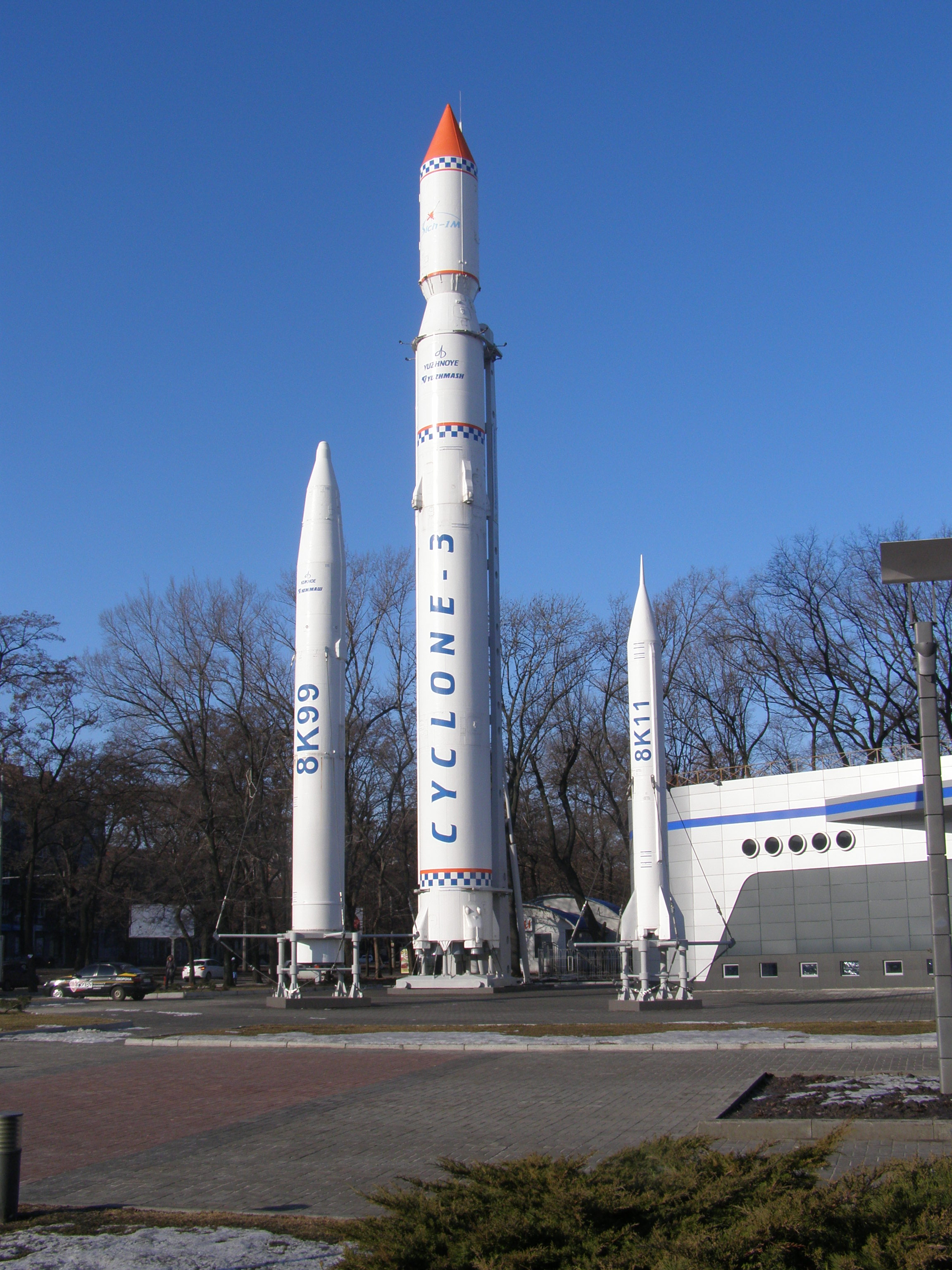
R-11 Zemlya (8К11) next to the larger RT-20 and Tsyklon-3 on display in downtown Dnipro

== See also ==
- Hwasong-5
- Hwasong-6
- R-17 Elbrus
- Scud
