= Hwasong-5 =

Short-range ballistic missile

- Diagram of the missile
- Type: Short range ballistic missile
- Place of origin: North Korea

Service history
- In service: 1987−present
- Used by: See operators
- Wars: Iran-Iraq war; Syrian civil war; Yemeni civil war (2014–present)

Production history
- Manufacturer: 125th Machine Factory
- Produced: 1986−1992
- No. built: 300
- Variants: See variants

Specifications
- Mass: 5,860 kg (12,920 lb)
- Length: 10.94 m (35.9 ft)
- Diameter: 88 cm (35 in)
- Maximum firing range: 300 kilometres (190 mi)
- Warhead: HE or cluster munition
- Warhead weight: 1,000 kg (2,200 lb)
- Propellant: TM-185 (20% gasoline 80% kerosene) / AK-27I (27% N_{2}O_{4} 73% HNO_{3})
- Accuracy: 450 m (490 yd) CEP
- Launch platform: MAZ-543 or converted civilian truck TEL

The Hwasong-5 (Korean: 《화성-5》형; lit. 'Mars Type 5') is a North Korean short-range ballistic missile (SRBM) derived from the Soviet R-17 Elbrus missile. It is one of several missiles with the NATO reporting name Scud-B.

== History ==
North Korea received rocket artillery, surface-to-air missiles (SAMs), and anti-ship missiles from the Soviet Union in the 1960s and from China in the 1970s. The range and accuracy of the 2K6 Luna were unsatisfactory, but the Soviets refused to supply ballistic missiles to limit tensions in Korea. North Korea sought a domestic missile-production capability by 1965, and began making military and industrial preparations shortly afterward.

A joint development program with China of the DF-61 missile began in 1977, but was cancelled in 1978 due to Chinese domestic politics. North Korea received R-17s from Egypt in the late 1970s or early 1980s. North Korea supported Egypt during the Yom Kippur War and the countries had friendly relations. The Soviet supply of ballistic missiles to Egypt ended when Egypt-Soviet Union relations deteriorated in the mid-1970s. In response, Egypt helped North Korea to reverse-engineer the R-17 with the goal of eventually setting up a production line with North Korean assistance. The Soviet Union may have eventually aided North Korea in these efforts after relations improved in the 1980s.

The R-17s were reverse engineered to develop multiple derivatives starting with the Hwasong-5. The Hwasong-5 may have had slightly better range than the R-17 due to improved engines. There were up to six test launches from April to September 1984 with three successes. The missile entered production in 1985. Serial production began in 1986. It entered North Korean service in 1987.

Hwasong-series missiles are reportedly manufactured by the No. 125 Factory in Pyongyang. It is estimated that about 300 missiles were produced from 1986 until 1991 or 1992. According to Lennox, an estimated 180 Hwasong-5 missiles were kept in North Korea while the rest were exported to Iran.

The Hwasong-5 is mounted on a North Korean copy of the MAZ-543 transporter erector launcher (TEL) vehicle or a converted civilian truck. The missile can carry high explosive (HE) or cluster munition warheads. Reportedly, the North Koreans are working on the development of chemical and biological warheads for their Hwasong missile program.

== Export ==
According to a 1988 CIA report, the Egyptians conducted a Hwasong-5 test launch in 1986, and that in 1988 the country was probably assembling Hwasong-5 missiles using knock-down kits. While its unknown if Egypt successfully managed to manufacture them locally, it is known that North Korea helped the Egyptians repair and refurbish their aging inventory of Soviet-built Scud-B systems.

Iran first requested missiles from North Korea in 1985, and a 1985 cooperation agreement between the countries may have included Iranian funds for ballistic missile development. According to Lennox, 120 missiles and about 18−20 TELs were exported in total. The North Koreans also helped set up a production line, which started to produce Shahab-1 missiles around 1989.

Following the end of production of Scud missiles in the Soviet Union, Syria turned to North Korea and China to support and strengthen its existing Scud battalions. Syria purchased an unknown number of Hwasong-5 and Hwasong-6 missiles and TELs from North Korea. The Syrians also produced Hwasong missiles under the designation Golan-1 and Golan-2 at the Syrian Scientific Studies and Research Centre's (SSRC) Jabal Taqsis facility near Hama with North Korean assistance.

In 1989, the United Arab Emirates purchased Hwasong-5 missiles. The missiles were decommissioned, allegedly due to unsatisfactory quality.

In 2002, Yemen purchased at least twenty Hwasong-5 missiles from the North Koreans. In 2015, it was reported that the Korea Mining and Development Trading Corporation attempted to procure spare parts for the MAZ-543 TELs from a Russian company and deliver them through a Ukrainian intermediary.

Besides confirmed exports to Iran, Syria, and the UAE, the North Koreans reportedly exported (or planned to export) the Hwasong-5 to the Republic of Congo, Cuba, Egypt, Ethiopia, Iraq, Libya, Myanmar, Vietnam, and Yemen; Lennox notes that North Korea may have only exported missile technology to the Egyptians and Libyans.

== Operational history ==
=== Iran-Iraq war ===
During the War of the Cities against Iraq, Iran initially used R-17 missiles supplied by Libya, but after the Soviet Union pressured the Libyans to stop supplying missiles, the Iranians turned to North Korea for help. According to Lennox, 77 Scud-B missiles were launched by Iran in 1988. While Pinkston mentions eight launch failures. North Korea received operational data from Iran.

=== Syrian civil war ===
The Assad regime made wide use of Scud missiles against opposition forces and civilian areas, with the first reported deployment in late 2012. Israeli sources claimed that 90% of the Syrian ballistic missile arsenal was expended against the rebels. Despite having developed chemical warheads for its missile arsenal, the regime used aerial bombs and artillery rockets to carry nerve agent attacks instead.

After the fall of the Assad regime in December 2024, Israel bombarded the SSRC production facilities and former Syrian Arab Army missile bases, but video evidence following the airstrikes indicate that at least some missile capabilities may have survived.

=== Yemen civil war (2014−present) ===
During the conflict, the Houthi movement have seized the country stockpile of Soviet and North Korean ballistic missiles and used them against Saudi Arabia and the UAE, forcing both countries to deploy Patriot missile batteries to counter them. According to the OSINT website Oryx, most of Yemen's Hwasong-5s were converted into Burkan-1 missiles.

== Variants ==
=== Iran ===
- Shahab-1 − Locally produced version

=== North Korea ===
- Hwasong-6 − Extended range variant with a range of 500 km (310 mi).
- KN-18 − A short-range ballistic missile first tested in May 2017, is also claimed by some sources as a variant of Hwasong-5.
- KN-21 − The US designation of a likely-abandoned variant with terminal maneuverability, tested on August 26, 2017. Its warhead is equipped with fins for being maneuverable.

=== Syria ===
- Golan-1 − Locally produced version, capable of carrying chemical warheads.

== Operators ==
=== Current ===
- Egypt − Possibly assembled locally in 1988 using knock-down kits
- Iran − Produced locally as the Shahab-1. According to a 2024 report from the International Institute for Strategic Studies (IISS), their service status is "uncertain"
- North Korea − 30+ Hwasong-5/6 launchers in service as of 2024
- Syria − Produced locally as the Golan-1. Status unknown following the fall of the Assad regime

=== Former ===
- United Arab Emirates − Reportedly decommissioned. According to the IISS, the UAE still have 6 launchers and up to 20 missiles in its inventories as of 2024
- Yemen − Pre-war stocks depleted during the Yemeni civil war (2014–present). Most were converted into Burkan missiles by the Houthis
