= Qiam 1 =

Iranian short-range ballistic missile

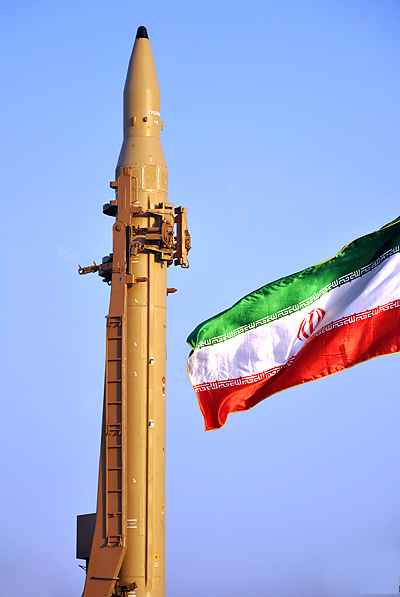
- Type: SRBM

Service history
- In service: 2010–present
- Used by: Iran

Production history
- Manufacturer: Iran
- No. built: >24

Specifications
- Mass: 6,155 kg (13,569 lb)
- Length: 11.5 m (38 ft)
- Diameter: 0.88 m (2.9 ft) (body) 0.60 m (2.0 ft) (warhead)
- Warhead: 750 kg (1,650 lb) High explosive (HE) fragmentation, submunitions, nuclear possible
- Engine: Liquid fuel rocket
- Operational range: 800 km (500 mi)
- Guidance system: Inertial navigation system
- Accuracy: 50 m (160 ft) circular error probable (CEP)
- Launch platform: Multiple

The Qiam 1 (Persian: قیام-١, "Uprising-1") is a short-range ballistic missile designed and built by Iran. It was developed from the Iranian Shahab-2, a licensed copy of the North Korean Hwasong-6, all of which are versions of the Soviet Scud-C missile. The Qiam 1 entered service in 2010, with a range of 800 km (500 mi) and 100 m (330 ft) (CEP) accuracy.

== Development ==
The Qiam 1 was first seen in footage of an August 2010 test, then publicly displayed in a parade in October 2010. On 22 May 2011, Iranian Defense Minister Ahmad Vahidi announced that the missile was being delivered to the Aerospace Force of the Islamic Revolutionary Guard Corps, although a US report noted deliveries in May 2010.

== Design ==
The Qiam 1 is a variant of the Scud missile. Its lack of fins reduces the missile's radar signature, particularly during ascent when fins can act as radar reflectors. Removing fins from a missile also reduces the structural mass, so the payload weight or missile range can be increased. Without the fins and associated drag, the missile can be more responsive to changes in trajectory.

Iranian sources cite an improved guidance system on the missile, and analysts note that adjusting the missile's in-flight trajectory without fins requires a highly responsive guidance system. The Qiam 1's accuracy is also improved with the addition of a separable warhead—since only the warhead needs to survive re-entry most missiles have structurally weak bodies which can cause an attached warhead to tumble as the body breaks apart. Attachments visible in pictures of the warhead may show antennas for controlling the missile's trajectory by radio.

The shape of the warhead on the Qiam 1 resembles that used on Iran's Shahab-3. The "baby-bottle" design can shift the center of gravity and center of pressure to compensate for changes in payload weight from earlier cone-shaped warheads; can increase drag which results in increased stability during reentry (at the expense of range) and, potentially, increase accuracy; and can increase the terminal velocity of the warhead, making it harder to intercept.

In an interview with the Fars News Agency, General Farahi reported "that the range of Qiam differs in accordance with its mission, meaning that the missile can hit targets in different distances according to its mission plan."

Multiple platforms may be used to launch the Qiam 1, and its launch and preparation time have been reduced compared to other Scud variants. The integration of GPS or another navigation system could be used to reduce preparation time and improve accuracy by better locating the missile in relation to its target.

The missile warhead can be fitted with submunitions dispensers for an anti-runway usage.

The name "Qiam-2" has been used for an upgraded version of the missile by some independent analysts, but not by official Iranian sources.

== Operational history ==
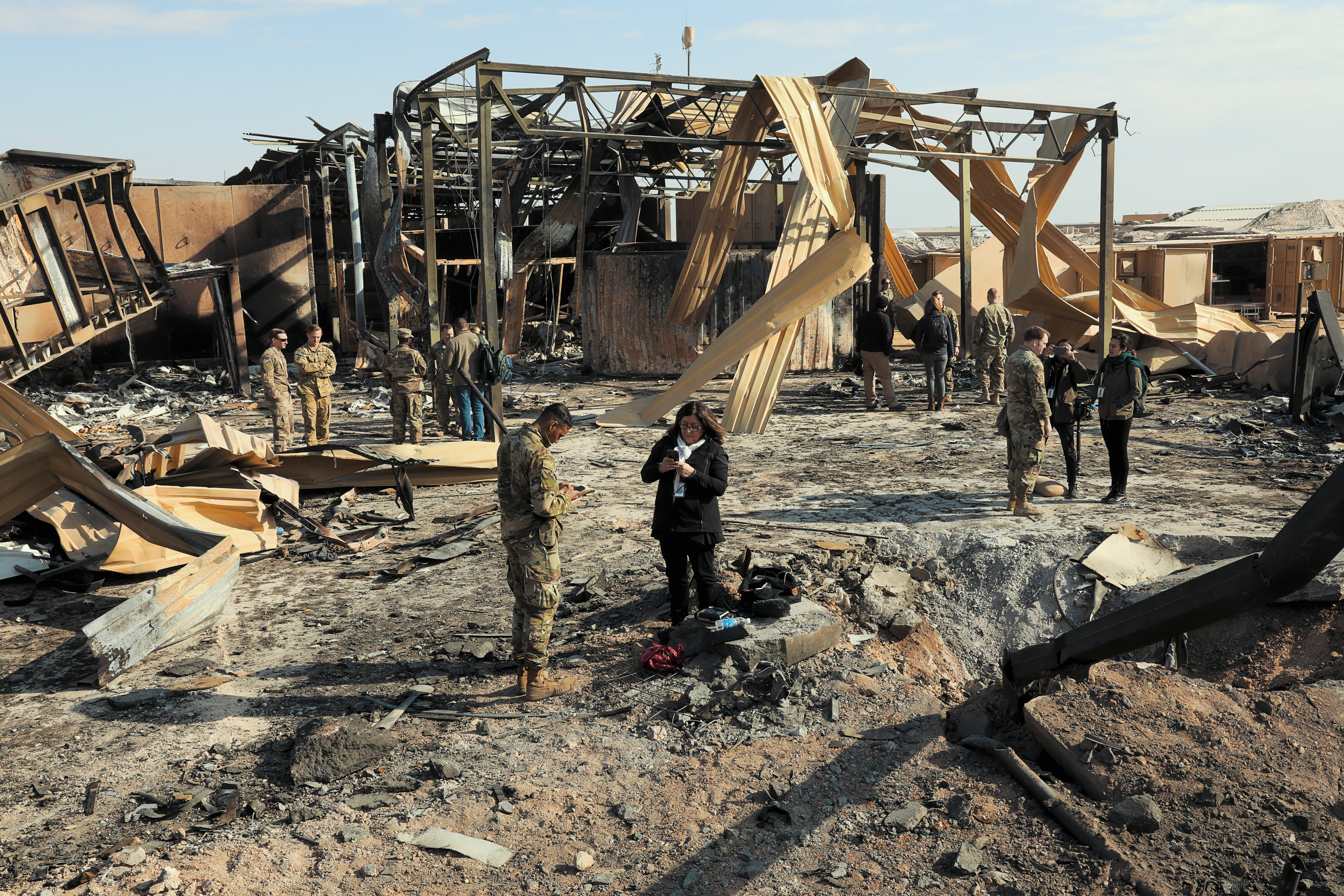
Aftermath of the Iranian missile attack on Al Asad air base

Test launches of the Qiam 1 occurred on 20 August 2010, 10 February 2014, and 9 March 2016. The Qiam 1 was used in combat for the first time on 17 June 2017 when Iran targeted Islamic State militants in Syria as retaliation for earlier bomb attacks in Tehran. At least two missiles hit the Islamic State stronghold of Mayadin.

Qiam missiles were also used in a strike on Islamic State in Kermanshah, Syria on 1 October 2018.

Qiam 1 missiles also struck US/Iraqi Al Asad Airbase in Iraq on 8 January 2020, destroying a Black Hawk helicopter, an air control tower and several tents. The main runway and an MQ-1 Predator drone were damaged. Two American soldiers who had been manning guard towers were blown from their posts and wounded during the missile attacks, and it was later disclosed that 109 US servicemen suffered traumatic brain injury. Some of them were evacuated to Kuwait and Germany for medical treatment. The missile were fitted with cluster warheads, according to the Iranian military. The strike was in retaliation for the killing of General Qasem Soleimani during an attack launched by the USAF with an MQ-9 Reaper drone on 3 January 2020.

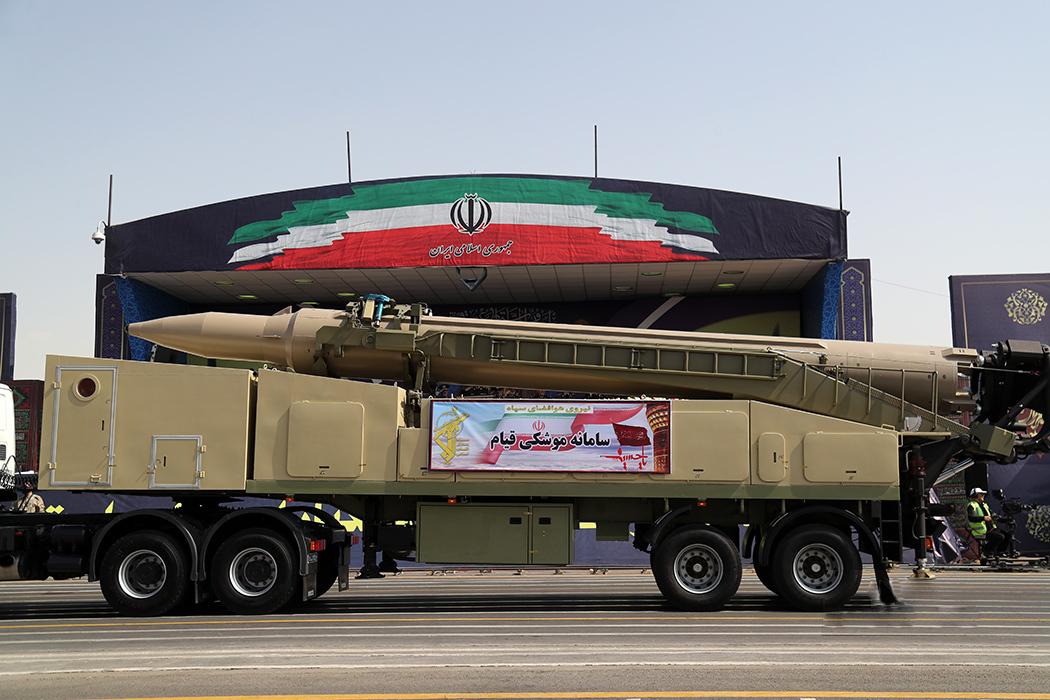
A Qiam-1 missile on its launcher at a parade in Tehran

=== Potential Use in Yemen ===
Extended range versions of the Qiam-1 operated by the Houthis in Yemen have flown more than 900 km.

Houthi forces in Yemen have unveiled two Scud-based mobile short-range ballistic missiles: the Burkan 1 and Burkan 2-H. On 4 November 2017, Saudi Arabia claimed to have intercepted a Burkan 2-H over its capital, Riyadh, with a MIM-104 Patriot. It reportedly was aimed at King Khalid International Airport. According to the US State Department, the missile was actually a Qiam. Saudi Arabia's Ministry of Culture and Information supplied the Associated Press with pictures from a military briefing of what it claimed were components from the missile bearing Iranian markings matching those on other pictures of the Qiam 1. Joint Forces Command of the Arab Coalition detailed the evidence. There have also been reports of previous attempts by Iran to send missiles to Yemen.

== Operators ==
- Iran

== See also ==
- Ballistic missile program of Iran
- Islamic Republic of Iran Armed Forces
- Defense industry of Iran
- List of military equipment manufactured in Iran
- Islamic Revolutionary Guard Corps Aerospace Force
- Science and technology in Iran
- Shahab-3 – (Iran)
- Hwasong-6 – (North Korea)
- Burkan-2 – (Yemen)
