= Burkan-2 =

Burkan 2
- Type: Ballistic missile, Mobile MRBM
- Place of origin: Yemen or Iran

Service history
- In service: February 2017
- Used by: Yemen & SPC Govt

Specifications
- Diameter: 0.88 metres (2.9 ft)
- Warhead weight: 250 kilograms (550 lb)
- Engine: liquid propellant rocket
- Operational range: ≥1,000 kilometres (620 mi)

Arabic name
- Personal (Ism): Burkan 2-H; H-بركان ٢

The Burkan-2H (Arabic H-بركان ٢), or Volcano-2H (also spelled as Borkan H2 and Burqan 2H) is a mobile short-range ballistic missile used by the Houthis militants in Yemen. The Volcano H-2 was first launched in July 2017. It is related to the Scud missile family.

== Development ==
The Burkan-2H was first revealed to the international community when it was launched at Saudi Arabia on 22 July 2017, initially Saudi Arabia speculated that the missiles are of Iranian origin, with USAF Lt. General Jeffrey L. Harrigian, Commander, Air Force's Central Command in Qatar, agreeing. Jane's Intelligence Review has assessed that it would be difficult to ship entire ballistic missiles to Yemen, suggesting the Burkan-2 is a Scud modified in Yemen for longer range.

== Design ==
The Burkan-2H is a member of the Scud family. Analysts identify it as being based on the Iranian Qiam 1/Scud-C, Iranian Shahab-2/Scud-C, or Scud-D missile. The Houthis claimed it was derived from the Scud-C, but United Nations experts assessed that the Houthis couldn't have decreased weight or upgrade the propulsion system enough to extend the 600 km (370 mi) maximum range of the Scud-C to 1,000 km (620 mi). In December 2018, UN Secretary-General Antonio Guterres said that the debris recovered from three Burkan-2H missiles fired over March−April 2018 showed "specific key design features consistent with those of the Iranian Qiam-1 short-range ballistic missile."

The shape of the warhead is a "baby-bottle" design, which can shift the center of gravity and center of pressure to compensate for changes in payload weight from cone-shaped warheads; can increase drag, increasing stability during reentry (at the expense of range), and potentially increase accuracy; and can increase the terminal velocity of the warhead, making it harder to intercept. Similarly shaped warheads are used on Iran's Shahab-3 and Qiam 1 missiles.

The Burkhan-2H have an estimated range of 1,000 km (620 mi). In order to extend the range of the Qiam-1 missile it was based on, the Houthis decreased the weight of the warhead from 750 kg (1,650 lb) to about 250 kg (550 lb).

== Operational history ==
The first recorded launch of the Burkan-2H was on 22 July 2017. The Houthis released a statement, saying that the missile successfully hit the region of Yanbu in Saudi Arabia and caused a major fire at an Aramco oil refinery. The Saudi government disputed this claim, stating that the fire was instead caused by a malfunctioning generator.

On 4 November 2017, Saudi Arabia claimed to have intercepted a Burkan-2H over its capital, Riyadh, with a MIM-104 Patriot. The missile was reportedly aimed at King Khalid International Airport. A December 2017 report in The New York Times casts doubt on the official Saudi claim that this missile was successfully shot down. The article cites a team of experts who allege that the missile's warhead was not intercepted and actually detonated near the airport. The research team reviewed photo and video evidence, which led them to conclude that the missile-defense system had failed; the MIM-104 interceptor either missed the Volcano H-2 entirely or struck only the rear propulsion segment of the H-2 after it had separated from the warhead.

On 19 December 2017, Houthi rebels launched a Burkan-2H at the capital of Saudi Arabia Riyadh, with their supposed objective being to take out senior officials that were all expected to meet at Saudi Defense Headquarters; however, Saudi Arabia claimed that they were able to intercept the ballistic missile. An independent analysis by IHS Jane's found no evidence that the missiles had been shot down.

According to the US State Department, the missile was actually an Iranian Qiam 1. Saudi Arabia's Ministry of Culture and Information also supplied the Associated Press with pictures from a military briefing of what it claimed were components from the intercepted missile bearing Iranian markings matching those on other pictures of the Qiam 1. Joint Forces Command of the Arab Coalition detailed the evidence. There have also been reports of previous attempts by Iran to send missiles to Yemen.

On 25 March 2018, the Houthis fired a total of seven missiles, with three of them aimed at Riyadh, including at least one Burkan-2H. One Egyptian citizen was killed in the incident, the first casualty in the capital since the start of Saudi involvement in the Yemeni conflict. Saudi sources claimed that he was killed by debris from an intercepted Houthi missile, but this is disputed, with analysis of videos from the scene appearing to show a Saudi Patriot missile malfunctioning and crashing into a residential neighbourhood. The remaining four missiles targeted airports and military installations near Abha, Jizan and Najran in the south of Saudi Arabia.

In 2024, it was reported that Lebanese Hezbollah may possess Burkan-2 missiles.

== See also ==
- Al-Najm al-Thaqib (missile)
- Qaher-1
- Burkan-1
- Qiam 1
- Badr-1 (rocket)
- Yemeni Civil War (2015–present)
- Yemeni Armed Forces
- Houthi insurgency in Yemen
- Conflict in Najran, Jizan and Asir
- Palestine 2 (missile)
