= Qaher-1 =

- Type: Tactical (SRBM)

Service history
- In service: 2015–present
- Used by: Yemen
- Wars: Yemeni Civil War (2014–present); Saudi Arabian-led intervention in Yemen

Specifications
- Mass: 2,000 kg
- Height: 11 m
- Warhead: One
- Blast yield: 195 kg fragmentation warhead
- Operational range: 250 km

The Qaher-1 (Arabic: قاهر-1, meaning "Subduer-1") is originally a Soviet SA-2 missile that was developed locally by the Houthis to be a two-stage surface to surface missile, with one stage using liquid fuel and the other solid fuel. It was unveiled in December 2015. The Houthis have also developed another variant known as Qaher-M2.

== See also ==
- Burkan-2
- Palestine 2 (missile)
