= Burkan-1 =

Iranian/Yemeni tactical short-range ballistic missile

Burkan 1
- Type: Tactical SRBM
- Place of origin: Yemen or Iran

Service history
- In service: September 2, 2016
- Used by: Houthis in Yemen Hezbollah in Lebanon

Specifications
- Mass: 7,300 kilograms (16,000 lb)
- Length: 12.5 metres (41 ft)
- Diameter: 0.88 metres (2.9 ft)
- Warhead: 500 kilograms (1,100 lb) conventional high-explosive
- Operational range: 800 kilometres (500 mi)
- Guidance system: Inertial

The Burkan-1 (Arabic 1 بركان) or Volcano-1 (also spelled as Burqan 1) is a mobile short-range ballistic missile used by the Houthis in Yemen. It is related to the Scud missile family.

== Development ==
Houthi forces unveiled the Burkan-1 when it was fired on 2 September 2016. According to Saudi Arabia, the missile and related Volcano H-2 are of Iranian origin, with USAF Lt. General Jeffrey L. Harrigian, Commander, Air Force's Central Command in Qatar, agreeing.

== Design ==
The Burkan-1 is a member of the Scud family. Analysts identify it as being based on either the Scud-B or Scud-D missile. Its range is greater than the Soviet-made Scuds Yemen possessed as of 2015, suggesting that the missile is not of Yemeni origin. Elements of the missile's design, including the inertial guidance system, fins, and control surfaces, are identical to those of the Qiam 1, leading several analysts and the U.S. State Department to believe that the missile is an Iranian-made Qiam 1. The Burkan-1 carries a warhead weighing more than 1,100 pounds (500 kg).

== Operational history ==
The Burkan-1 was first fired on 2 September 2016, aimed at King Fahad Air Base in Taif, with Houthi sources claiming a successful hit but Saudi Arabia claiming there was no damage. On 27 October 2016, another missile was fired, but destroyed in mid-air by a Saudi Patriot missile before reaching its target. According to the Saudi-led coalition the target was Mecca, but according to the Houthis the target was King Abdulaziz International Airport, near Jeddah. On 28 July 2017, another missile was fired on a similar trajectory and intercepted in mid-air, leading to Saudi Arabia again claiming the target was Mecca and the Houthis claiming the target was King Fahad Air Base.

== See also ==
=== Related articles ===
- Burkan-2 – (Yemen)
- Yemeni Civil War (2015-Present)
- Yemeni Armed Forces
- Houthi insurgency in Yemen
- Conflict in Najran, Jizan and Asir

=== Comparable missiles ===
- Ghaznavi – (Pakistan)
- Abdali-I – (Pakistan)
- Shaheen-I – (Pakistan)
- J-600T Yıldırım – (Turkey)
- SOM – (Turkey)
- Bora – (Turkey)
- Fateh-313 – (Iran)
- Qiam 1 – (Iran)
- Al-Husayn – (Iraq)
- Nasr – (Pakistan)
- Zelzal – (Iran)
- Tondar-69 – (Iran)
