= Tactical ballistic missile =

Ballistic missile designed for short-range use on the battlefield

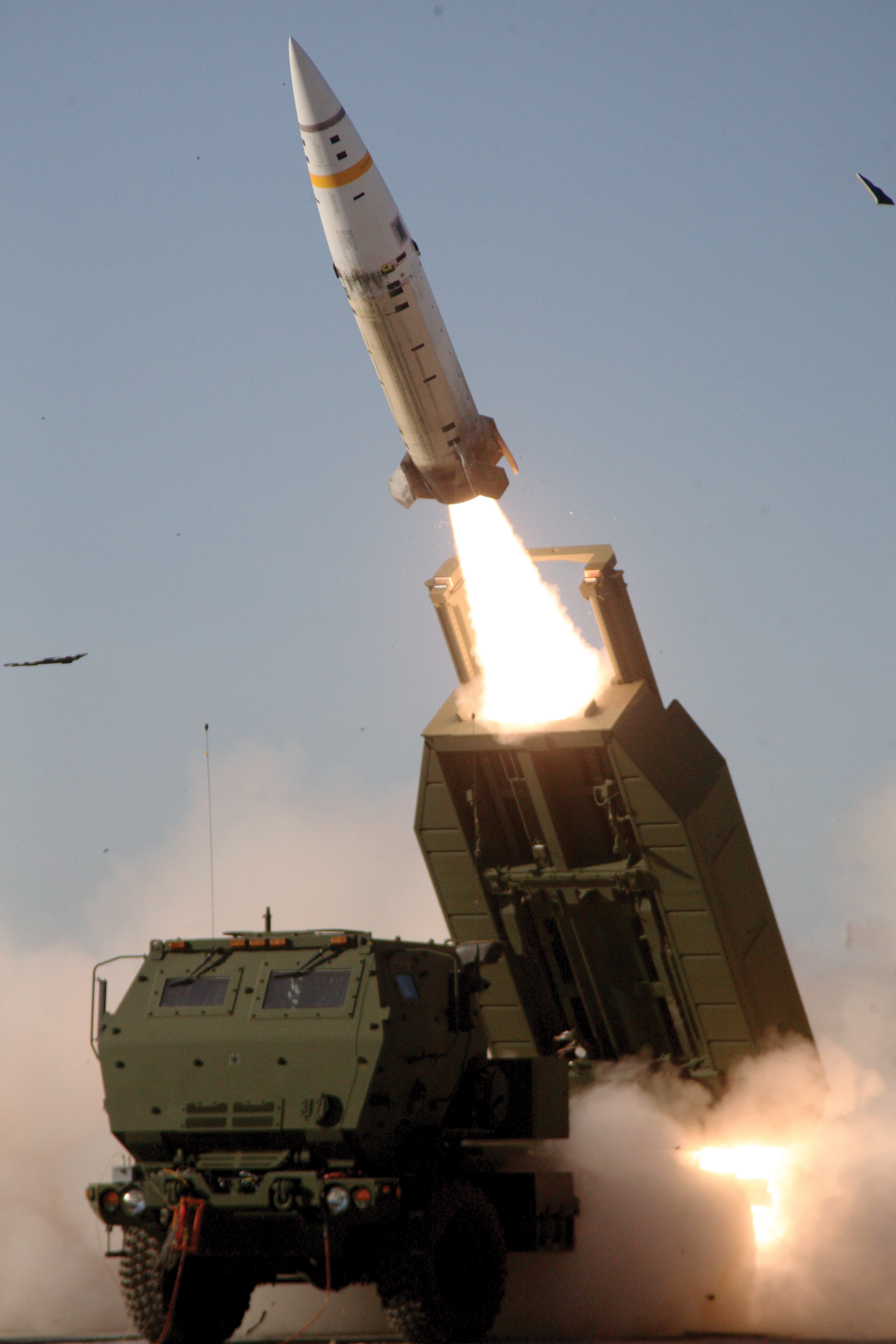
The MGM-140 ATACMS tactical ballistic missile firing

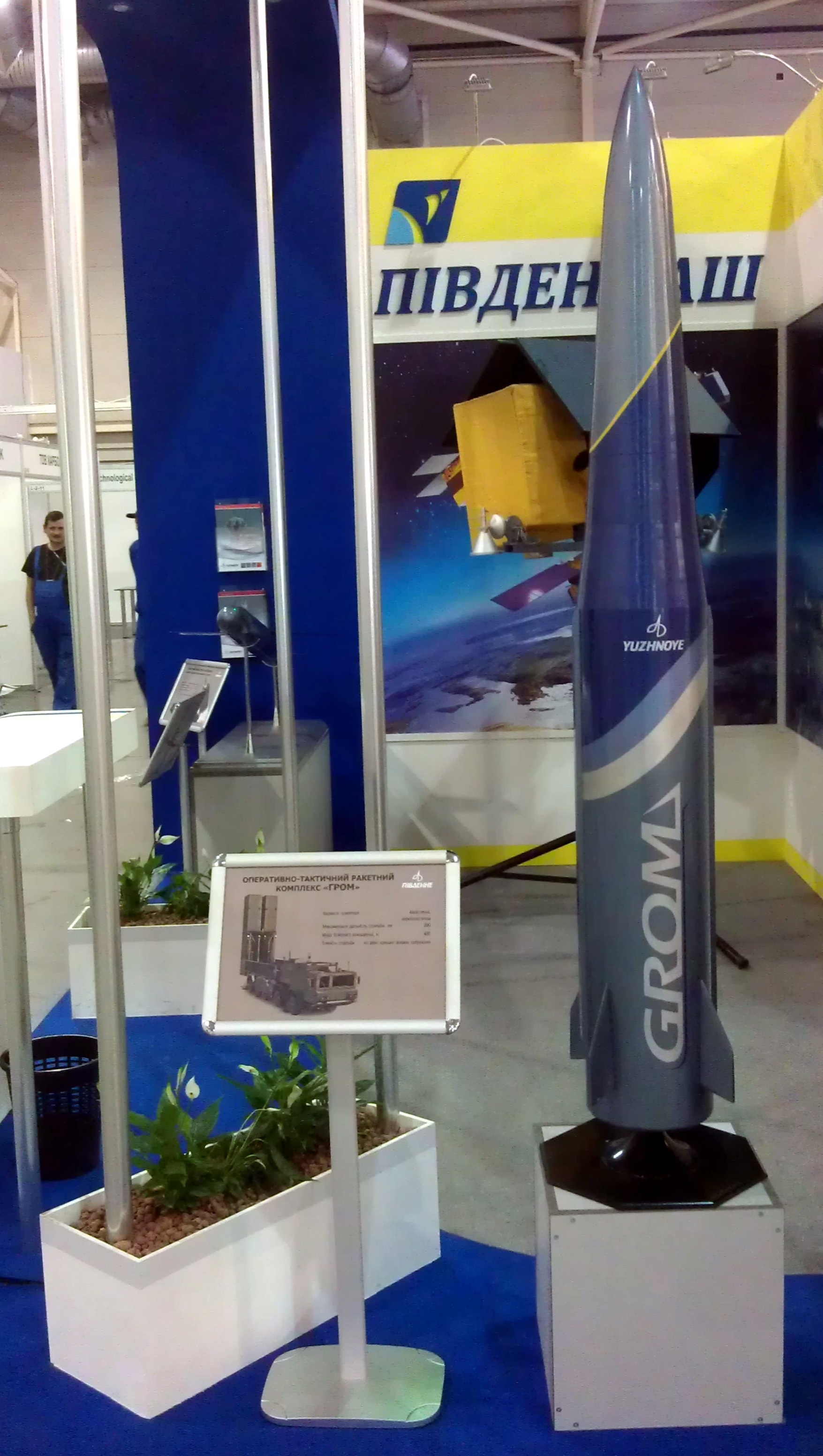
Hrim-2 OTRK SAPSAN

A tactical ballistic missile (TBM), or battlefield range ballistic missile (BRBM), is a ballistic missile designed for short-range battlefield use. Typically, range is less than 1,000 kilometres (620 mi). Tactical ballistic missiles are usually mobile to ensure survivability and quick deployment, and can carry a variety of warheads to target enemy facilities, assembly areas, artillery, and other targets behind front lines. Warheads include conventional high explosive, chemical, biological, or nuclear warheads. Typically, tactical nuclear weapons are limited in their total yield compared to strategic nuclear weapons.

== Design ==
Tactical ballistic missiles fill the gap between conventional rocket artillery and longer-range short-range ballistic missiles. Tactical missiles can carry heavy payloads deep behind enemy lines in comparison to rockets or gun artillery, while having better mobility and less expense than the more strategic theatre missiles. Additionally, due to their mobility, tactical missiles are better suited to responding to developments on the battlefield.

For many nations, tactical missiles represent the upper limit of their land-based military equipment. They can provide a powerful weapon for a very economical price, and in some cases are sought to help level the playing field against opponents who are superior in other areas of military technology. Currently, tactical ballistic missile technology remains within reach for nations that may face difficulties in obtaining other advanced military technologies.

Ballistic missiles are still difficult to defeat on the battlefield. Newer air defense systems have improved ability to intercept tactical missiles, but still can not reliably protect assets against ballistic missile threats. This allows a moderate force of missiles to threaten a superior enemy by penetrating their air defenses better than with conventional aircraft, while providing a deeper strike than conventional artillery.

== Propulsion ==
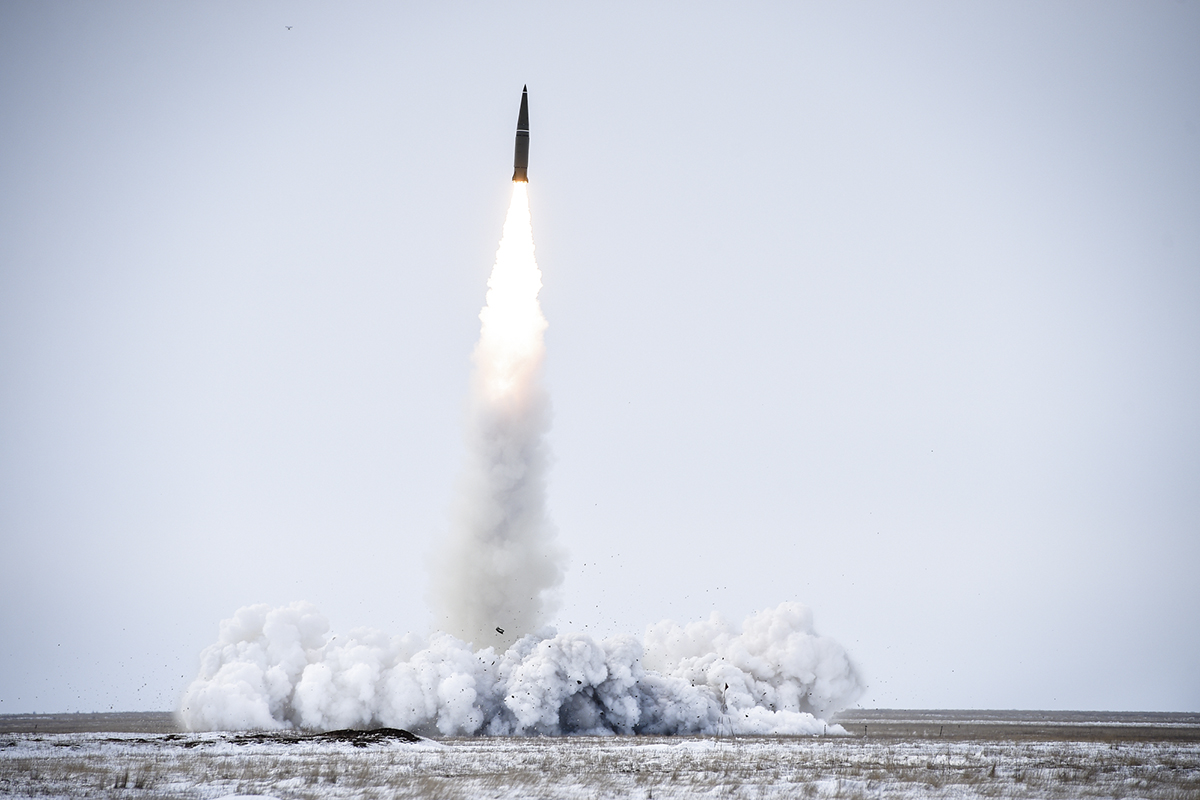
An Iskander-M solid-propelled rocket being launched in a 2018 exercise.

Early large rockets and missiles were propelled by liquid-propellant rocket engines, as the first types developed. These were replaced as soon as possible by solid fuel rocket motors. Liquid propellants involve cryogenic (liquid oxygen) or corrosive (nitric acid) oxidisers. These must be loaded before launch, delaying the rocket's time into action. This delay was a problem for large strategic missiles, but especially so for tactical.

Missiles, particularly in the Soviet Union, switched to using storable liquid propellants such as IRFNA, inhibited nitric acid. These were still hazardous to handle, but could be stored pre-loaded in the missile. This also allowed the development of single vehicle transporter erector launchers (TEL), rather than the previous convoy of carriers, launchers, fuel vehicles and service vehicles.

Western missiles adopted solid propellants instead, (Note: The liquid-fuelled MGM-52 Lance was one exception, remaining in service until the end of the Cold War.) which were inherently storable, and later Warsaw Pact missiles followed suit. Tactical missiles are now almost universally solid-fuelled, except for some states using indigenous derivatives of the original Scud platform.

== Country-specific tactical ballistic missiles ==
=== United States ===
Name	Operational range	Maximum speed	Introduction	Current status	Operators
Precision Strike Missile (PrSM)	500 km	3.5 mach	2023	In service	USA
MGM-140 ATACMS	300 km	Mach 3	1986	In service	See list: Bahrain; Greece; Taiwan; South Korea; Turkey; United Arab Emirates; Romania; Ukraine; Morocco
MGM-52 Lance	120 km	>Mach 3	1972	Decommissioned	See list: Belgium; West Germany; Israel; Italy; Netherlands; United Kingdom
MGM-18 Lacrosse	19 km	Mach 0.8	1959	Decommissioned	USA (formerly)
PGM-11 Redstone	92.5 - 323.5 km	Mach 5.5	1958	Decommissioned	USA (formerly)

== Specific tactical ballistic missiles ==
	Propellant	Range	Introduction	Withdrawal	Origin	Operators
Al-Samoud 2	Liquid	180 km	2001	2003	Iraq	
Al-Hussein	Liquid	600–650 km	1987	1991	Iraq	
Blue Water	Solid		1960 (first flight)	cancelled 1962	United Kingdom	
MGM-140 ATACMS	Solid	300 km	1986	2007 (program terminated, missile remains in service)	United States	Bahrain; Greece; Taiwan; South Korea; Turkey; United Arab Emirates; Romania; Ukraine; Morocco
MGM-52 Lance	Liquid	120 km	1972	1992	United States	Belgium; West Germany; Israel; Italy; Netherlands; United Kingdom
PGM-11 Redstone	Liquid	92.5 km-323 km	1958	1964	USA	
Precision Strike Missile		>500 km	2023		USA	
MGM-18 Lacrosse		19 km	1959	1964	USA	
WS-1		60–180 km	≈1990		China	
WS-2 / WS-3		70–200 km	≈2004		China	
DTI-1		60–180 km			Thailand	
Hrim-2		280–500 km			Ukraine	
FP-7 (Ballistic Missile)	Solid	>200 km			Ukraine	
Shaurya	Two-stage solid	700-1900 km	2011		India	
Prahaar	Solid	150 km	2011		India	
Pragati	Solid	170 km	2013		India	
Pranash	Solid	200 km	TBD		India	
Pralay	Solid	150-500 km	TBD		India	
Ghaznavi (missile)	Solid	290–320 km	2004		Pakistan	
Nasr/Hatf IX	Solid	70 km	2013		Pakistan	
Abdali/Hatf-II	Solid	180 km	2002		Pakistan	
Hatf-I	Solid	70 km	1990		Pakistan	
Hatf-1A	Solid	100 km	1990		Pakistan	
Hatf-1B	Solid	100 km	1990		Pakistan	
Sky Spear	Solid	120–300 km	2001		Taiwan	
J-600T Yıldırım	Solid	150–900 km	1998		Turkey	
TOROS	Solid	100–160 km			Turkey	
Bora	Solid	280–700 km	2017		Turkey	Indonesia
T-300 Kasırga		100–120 km			Turkey	
R-11 Zemlya	Liquid	180 km	1958		USSR	
2K1 Mars	Solid	7–18 km			USSR	
R-17/R-300 Elbrus	Liquid	300–700 km	1964		USSR	
OTR-21 Tochka	Solid	70–185 km	1975		USSR	Armenia; Azerbaijan; Belarus; Bulgaria; Kazakhstan; North Korea; Russia; Ukraine; Syria; Yemen Former: Czechoslovakia; Czech Republic; East Germany; Germany; Lithuania; Poland; Slovakia; Soviet Union
OTR-23 Oka	Solid	500 km	1979	1987	USSR	
2K6 Luna		10–50 km	1960	1982	USSR	Afghanistan; Algeria; Cuba; East Germany; Egypt; Iraq; Libya; North Korea; Poland; Romania; Soviet Union; Syria; Yemen; Yugoslavia
9K52 Luna-M		70 km	1964		USSR	Algeria; Afghanistan; Belarus; Egypt; Libya; North Korea; Russia; Syria; Ukraine; Yemen Former; Bulgaria; Cuba; Czechoslovakia; East Germany; Hungary; Iraq; Kuwait; Lebanon; Poland; Romania; South Yemen; Soviet Union; Yugoslavia
LORA		400–800 km	2005		Israel	Azerbaijan Morocco
Hwasong-11 (KN-02)	Solid	120–160 km	2008		North Korea	Syria
Hwasong-11A (KN-23)	Solid	450 km	2018		North Korea	
Hwasong-11B (KN-24)	Solid	410 km	2019		North Korea	
Hwasong-11D	Solid	100–300 km	2022		North Korea	
KN-25		380 km	2019		North Korea	
9K720 Iskander	Solid	400–500 km	2006		Russia	
Predator Hawk		300–400km	2016		Israel	Morocco
Hyunmoo-1	Solid	180 km	1977		South Korea	
Hyunmoo-2A	Solid	300 km	2006		South Korea	
Ure-1	Solid	180 km	2022		South Korea	
BRE8 King Dragon/Fire Dragon	Solid	280–300 km	2014?		China	
Burkan-1		800 km	2016		Yemen	
al-Najm al-Thaqib-1		45 km	2015		Yemen	
al-Najm al-Thaqib-2		75 km	2015		Yemen	
Fajr-5	Solid	180 km	1990s		Iran	Syria; Yemen; Iraq; Lebanon
Shahab-1		350 km	1987	~2016	Iran	Syria
Shahab-2	Liquid	500 km	1990	2016	Iran	Syria
Fateh-110	Solid	300 km	2002		Iran	Syria; Lebanon
Fateh-313	Solid	500 km	2015		Iran	Syria
Qiam 1	Liquid	800 km	2010		Iran	Yemen
Zelzal-1	Solid	160 km	1990		Iran	Syria
Zelzal-2	Solid	210 km	1998		Iran	Syria; Yemen; Lebanon
Zelzal-3	Solid	200–250 km	2007		Iran	Syria
Naze'at 6-H	Solid	80–100 km	1980's		Iran	
Naze'at 10-H	Solid	100–130 km	1980's		Iran	
Fath-360	Solid	30–120 km; Fath-360L: 180 km	2022		Iran	Iran Russia
Jerina-1	Solid	285-300 km	2017		Serbia	
Jerina-2	Liquid	75 km	2017		Serbia	
ITBM-600	Solid	80-280 km	2025		Turkey (derived from PRC)	
Al-Qari	Solid	Unknown	2026		Iraq	

== See also ==
- List of missiles
