= Hassan Tehrani Moghaddam =

Iranian military officer (1959–2011)

Sardar Shahid Hassan Tehrani Moghaddam
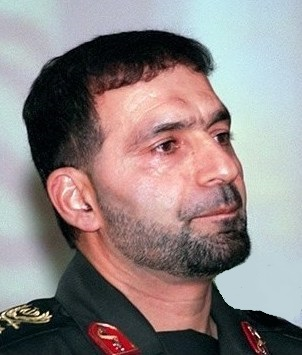
- Born: 29 October 1959; Tehran, Imperial State of Iran
- Died: 12 November 2011 (aged 52); Bid Kaneh, Tehran province, Iran
- Military career
- Allegiance: Revolutionary Guards
- Rank: Brigadier general
- Nicknames: Hassan Tehrani, Hassan Moghaddam
- Conflicts: Iran–Iraq War

Hassan Tehrani Moghaddam (Persian: حسن طهرانی‌مقدم) (29 October 1959 – 12 November 2011) was an Iranian military officer in the IRGC Aerospace Forces and designer of Iran's ballistic missile project. He was the chief of the Army of the Guardians of the Islamic Revolutionary Guard Corps. He founded Iran's long-range missile program and sought the expertise and blueprint designs from North Korea in order to help develop Iran's missile technology. He designed the Shahab, Ghadr and Sejjil missiles with an operational range of more than 1,000–2,000 kilometres. For these reasons he is regarded as the father of Iran's missile program. He was killed on 12 November 2011 in the Bid Kaneh explosion, at a military base belonging to the Islamic Revolutionary Guard Corps 25 miles west of Iran's capital, Tehran.

== Biography ==
Tehrani Moghaddam was born on October 29, 1955, in the Sarcheshmeh neighborhood of Tehran. He graduated from high school in 1977. Hassan Tehrani Moghadam studied at two associate degrees at the Islamic Revolution Vocational Technical College and a bachelor's degree in foundry industries at Shahid Rajaee Teacher Training University. He first completed his associate degree in 1980 and his bachelor's degree in 1995 at these universities.

Before the 1979 Iranian revolution, Moghaddam was proficient in constructing homemade bombs. Later, as protests intensified against the Shah, he joined a militia group in Gilan that was involved in armed struggle against the government. In 1980, he joined the Islamic Revolutionary Guard Corps and was given special responsibility for information in the northern section of Army of the Guardians of the Islamic Revolution. He had important roles in the Iran–Iraq War as follows:

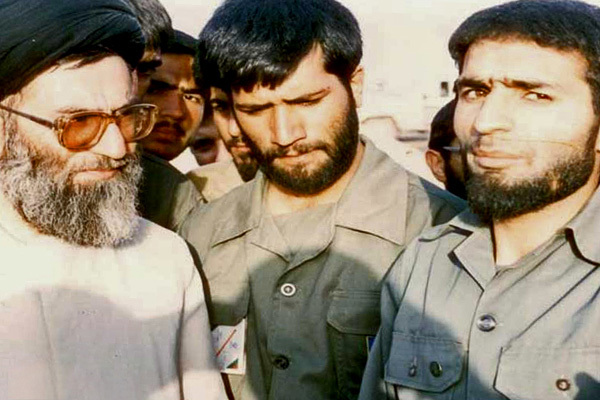
Ali Khamenei (left) with Hassan Tehrani Moghaddam (right) during the Iran-Iraq war

- Establishment of the first artillery corps in IRGC in 1982
- Establishment of the artillery research center in Ahvaz in 1982
- Establishment of the missile command center in IRGC in October 1983
- Firing artillery shells towards Basrah in the Iran–Iraq War in January 1984
- Firing the first rocket towards Kirkuk in the Iran–Iraq War in February 1985
- Missile Commander of the IRGC Air Force in August 1985
- Setting up the Lebanese Hezbollah missile unit in the years 1986–87
- Designed the Naze'at missile, the first Iranian missile, in 1987
- Commanded IRGC in Operation Mersad in August 1988 against MEK forces.

== Iranian missile program ==
After the Iran–Iraq War (1980–1988), as Iran had only non-native Scud missiles with an operational range limited to 300 kilometers, Moghaddam set up a long-range missile program and designed a number of different missiles. His immediate goal was to develop a ballistic missile program with an operational range of more than 2,000 kilometers that could hugely threaten Israel. Mostafa Izadi, a commander in the Army of the Guardians of the Islamic Revolution and close friend of Moghaddam said, "Since 1984 [Moghaddam] pioneered the IRGC's ground to ground missile system ... the work which has so frightened the world's imperialist powers and the Zionist regime today."

At first, Moghaddam designed missiles that were reverse-engineered from Russian made Scud missiles. He produced the Shahab-1 from the Scud-B, and then developed the Shahab-2 and the Zelzal missiles (Zelzal-1, Zelzal-2, and Zelzal-3). In 1998, from the Scud-C he developed the Shahab-3, which is a medium-range ballistic missile with an operational range of 2,000 kilometers. It was tested between 1998 and 2003 and was added to Iran's military arsenal on 7 July 2003, with an official unveiling by Ayatollah Khamenei on 20 July of the same year. Moghaddam later improved the Shahab-3 and developed a new version of this missile called Ghadr-110, which has a range of 1,800–2,000 kilometers and is also known as the Ghadr-101.

In 2008, Moghaddam developed and designed with the help of North Korea the first range of Iranian solid-fueled ballistic missiles known as the Sejjil. The Sejjil replaced the Shahab liquid-fueled ballistic missiles. According to US Pentagon sources, the missile profile of the Sejjil closely matches those of the Ashura (Ghadr-110) and Samen missiles. The Sejjil launch tests on 13 November 2008 displayed an operational range of 2,000–2,500 kilometers. Subsequent to this Moghaddam was the chief designer of the Shahab, Ghadr, and Sejjil missiles.

Saeed Qasemi, a commander in the Army of the Guardians of the Islamic Revolution, said that Iran owed its missile program to Moghaddam and stated: "A major part of [Iran's] progress in the field of missile capability was due to round-the-clock efforts by ... Moghaddam". Another commander has described Moghaddam as the founder of Iran's ballistic missile systems. Hossein Salami, the deputy head of the Islamic Revolutionary Guard Corp, declared about his role: "Moghaddam was the main architect of the IRGC' missile power and the founder of the deterrent power of our country."

== Death ==
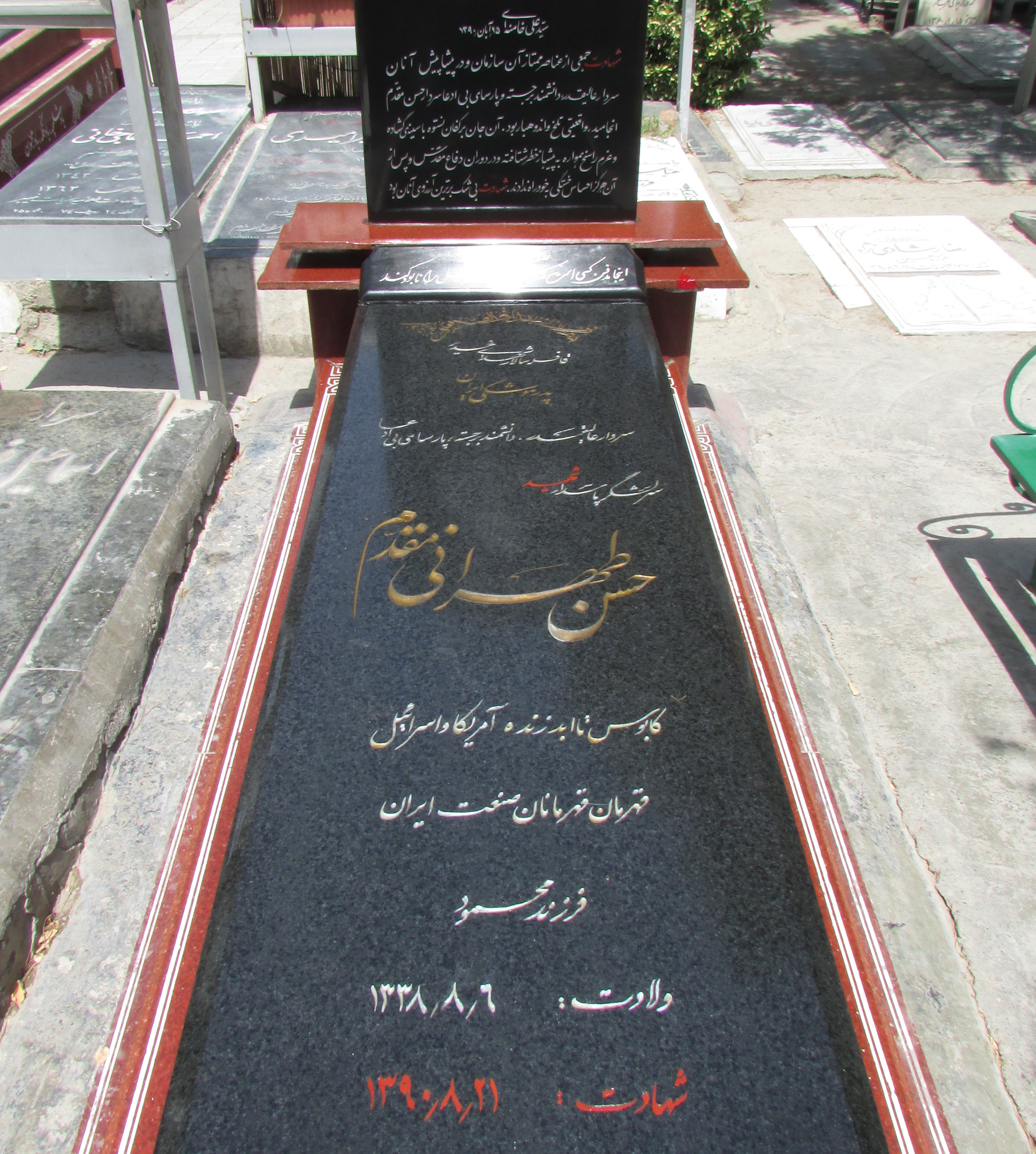
Tehrani Moghaddam's tomb at Behesht Zahra

The Bid Kaneh arsenal explosion was a very large explosion that occurred on 12 November 2011 at the Modarres missile garrison. Seventeen members of the Army of the Guardians of the Islamic Revolution and the Islamic Revolutionary Guard Corps were killed in the incident, including Tehrani Moghaddaam. Those who died are known as the "Shahidan Ghadir".

After the explosion, initial reports indicated that it had happened at a CNG station, but this was later denied. Iranian officials said that the blast at the missile base was an accident, and ruled out any sabotage organized by the United States and its regional allies. The Army of the Guardians of the Islamic Revolution stated that the explosion "had taken place in an missile arms depot when munitions were being moved". On the Iranian parliament's news website, icana.ir, Parviz Soroori, an Iranian MP, was quoted as saying, "No sabotage was involved in this incident. It has nothing to do with politics". However, Time magazine reported claims from a "western intelligence source" that Israeli intelligence agency Mossad had orchestrated the explosion; other reports, which were also attributed to intelligence services in the West, likewise mentioned the involvement of Israel's intelligence services. An "official with close links to the Iranian Government" spoke to The Guardian anonymously and claimed that the blast was "part of the covert war against Iran, led by Israel".

== Legacy ==
The book "The Front Line" provides a documentary-style narration of two years in the life of Hassan Tehrani Moghadam, detailing the formation of the Iranian missile unit and the challenges faced during that period. Written by Faezeh Ghaffar Haddadi, this book has been reprinted sixteen times.

== Gallery ==
The funeral rites of the self-sufficiency unit of AGIR with presence of Ali Khamenei

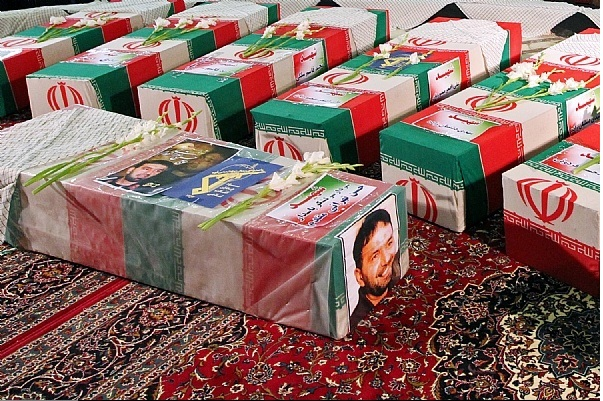

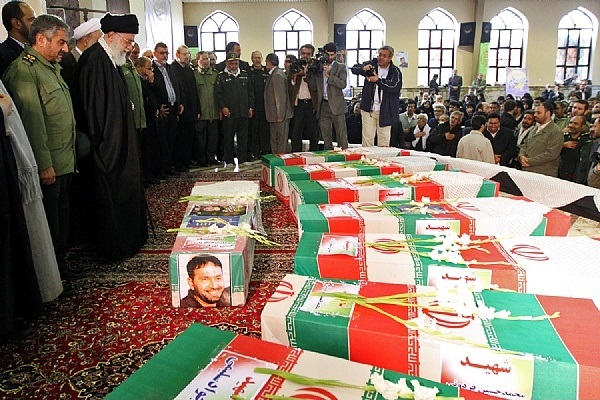

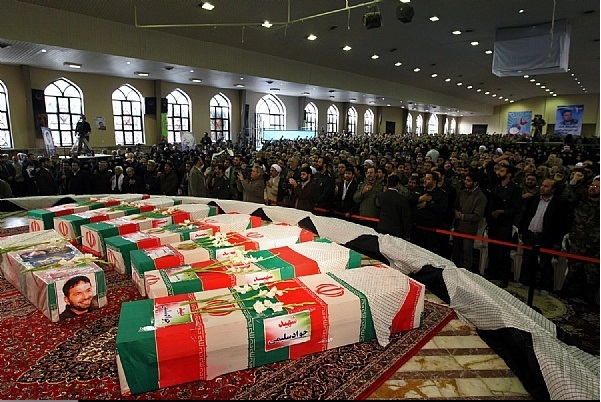

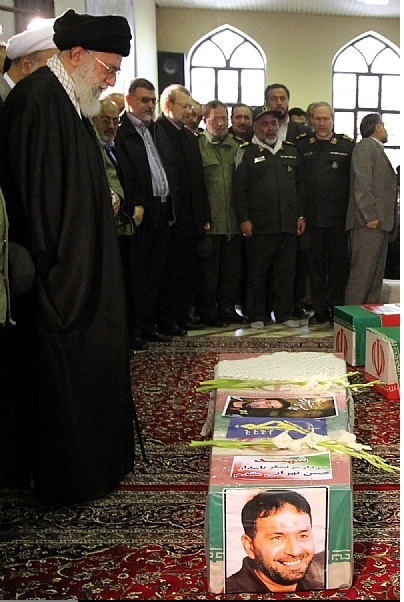
Grave of Hassan Tehrani Moghaddam

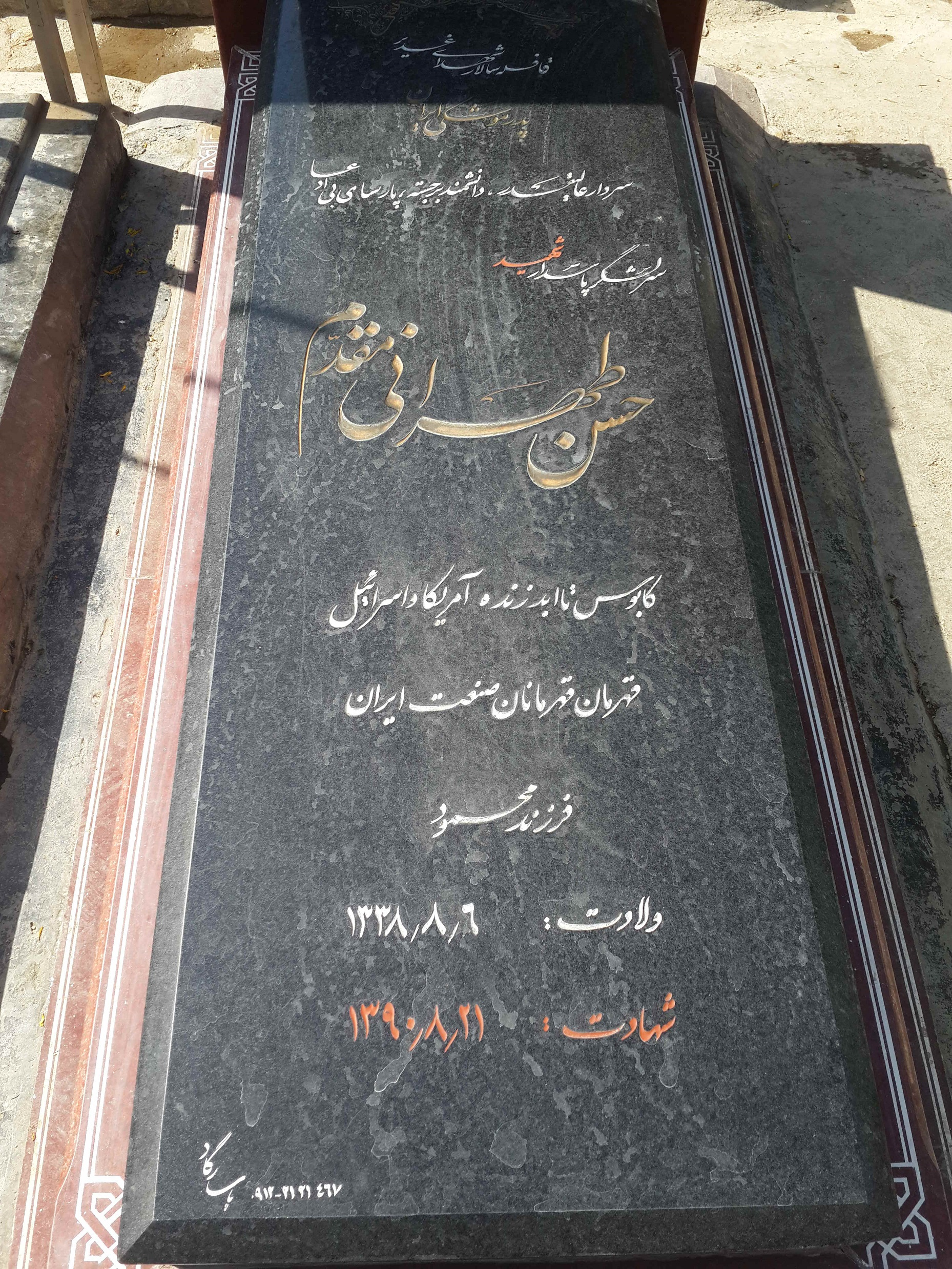

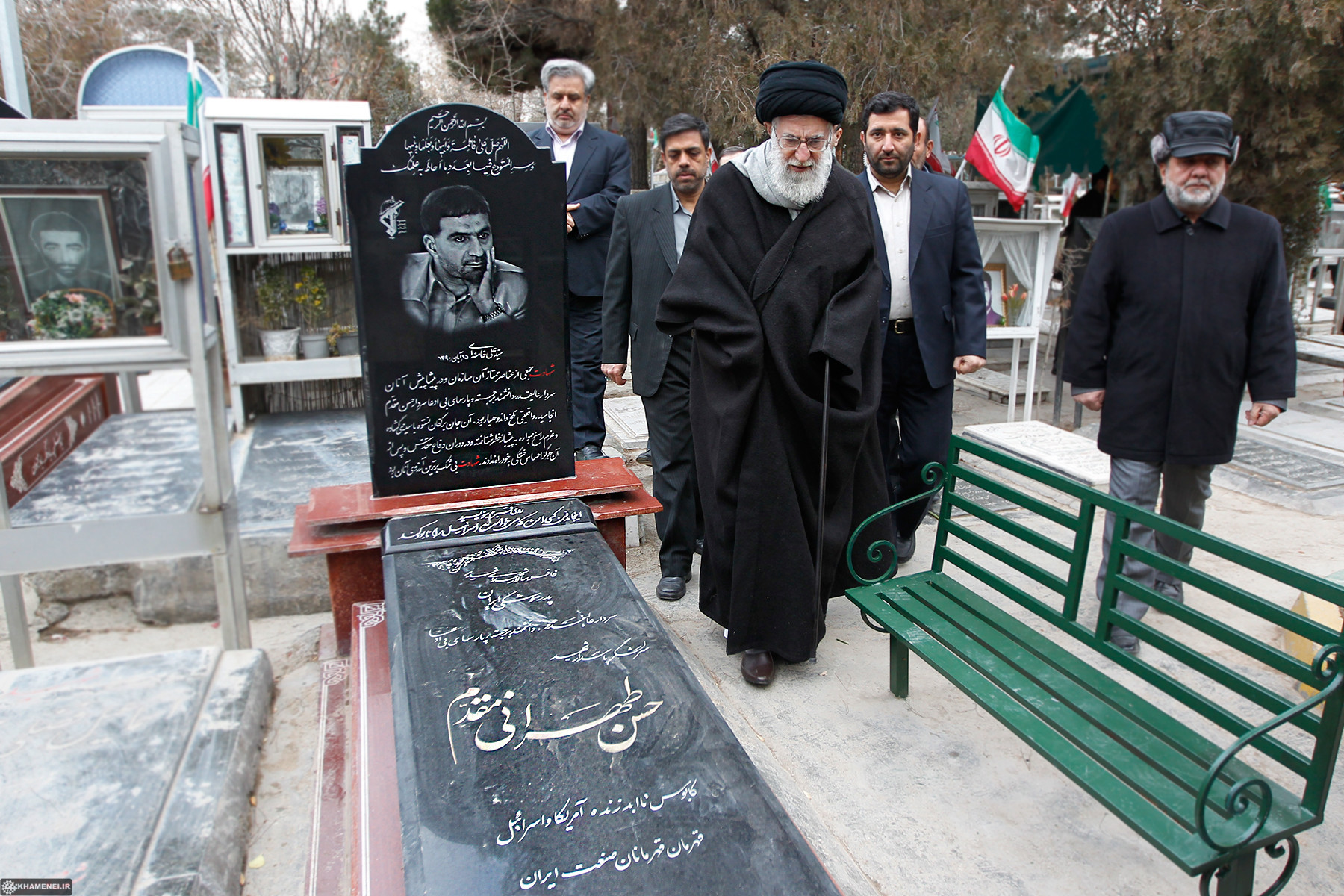

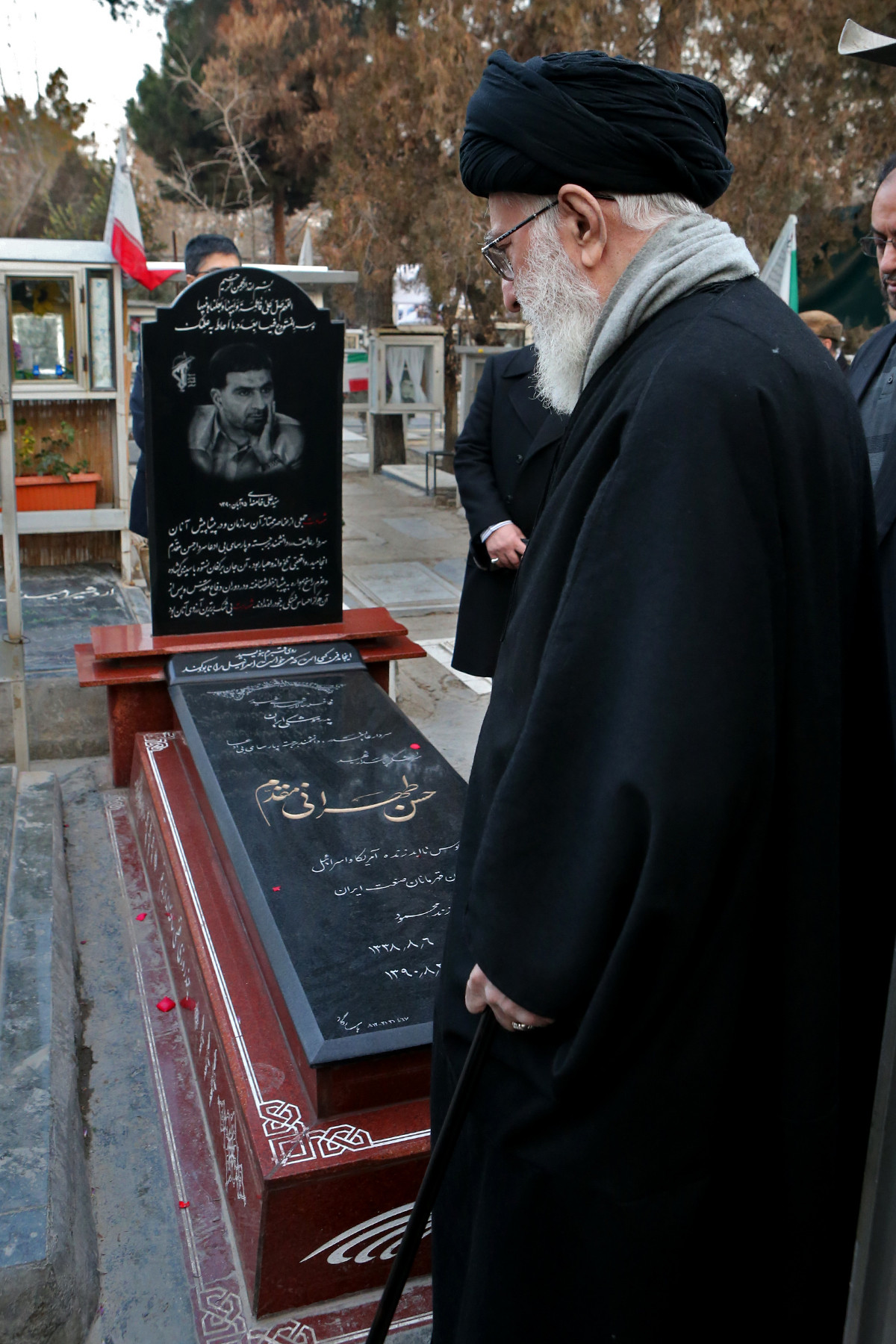

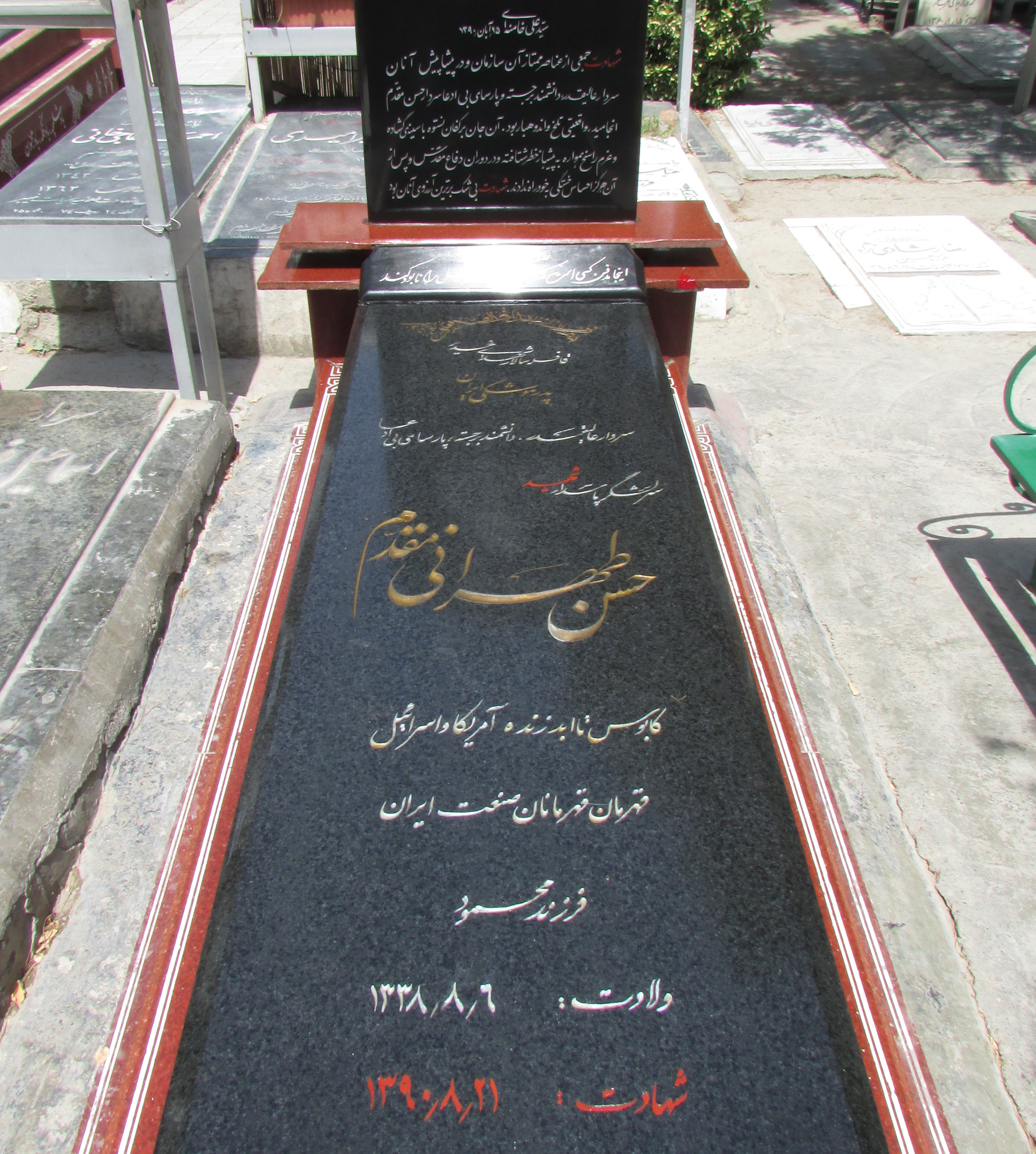

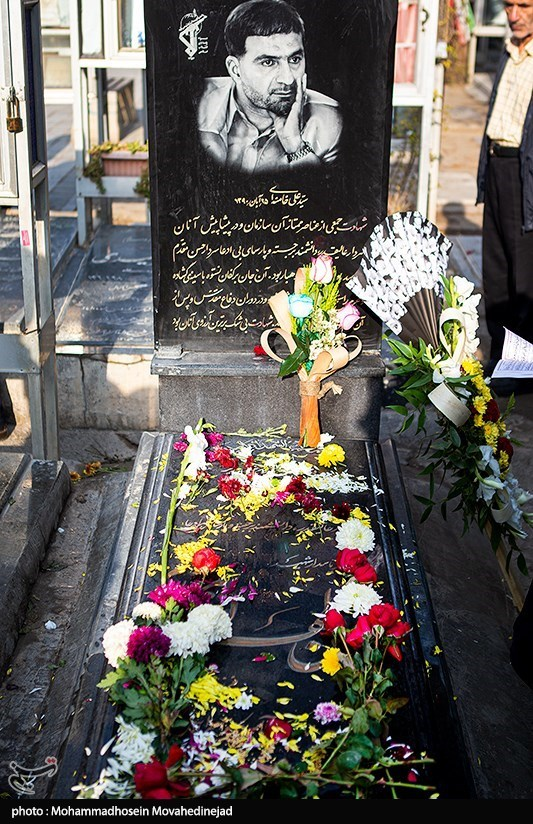

== See also ==
- List of Iranian commanders in the Iran–Iraq War
- Hassan Sayyad Khodaei
