= Zelzal =

Zelzal (Persian: زلزال-۱, meaning "Earthquake") is a series of artillery rockets developed by Iran. The series consists of:

- Zelzal-1, with an estimated range of 150 km (93 mi)
- Zelzal-2, with an estimated range of 210 km (130 mi)
- Zelzal-3, with an estimated range of 200 km (120 mi)

These rockets were developed by Hassan Tehrani Moghaddam following development the Shahab-1 and Shahab-2.

== See also ==
- Aerospace Force of the Islamic Revolutionary Guard Corps
- Armed Forces of the Islamic Republic of Iran
- Defense industry of Iran
- Equipment of the Iranian Army
- Fateh-110
