= K-15 Krajina Missile =

K-15 Krajina
- K-15 Krajina Missile in 1995
- Type: Tactical ballistic missile
- Place of origin: Republic of Serbian Krajina

Service history
- In service: 1995
- Used by: Army of Serb Krajina
- Wars: Yugoslav Wars

Specifications
- Mass: 5,100lb (2,300kg)
- Warhead: HE 1,001lb (454kg)
- Engine: Liquid-propellant
- Operational range: 150km (93mi)
- Guidance system: Inertial navigation
- Transport: ZIL-131

The K-15 Krajina (Serbian Cyrillic: К-15 Крајина) was a tactical ballistic missile displayed in Republic of Serbian Krajina in June 1995. It appeared to be a modified Soviet Navy P-15 Termit Anti-ship missile which was converted for use as a ballistic missile mounted on a S-75 Dvina launcher.

The range was estimated to be 150 km (93 mi). The extremely limited range of the K-15 Krajina, combined with what is presumed to be a small payload, made the threat from such a weapon minimal. Sources suggest that the missile development was continued by Serbia and Montenegro well into 1996.
