= Naze'at =

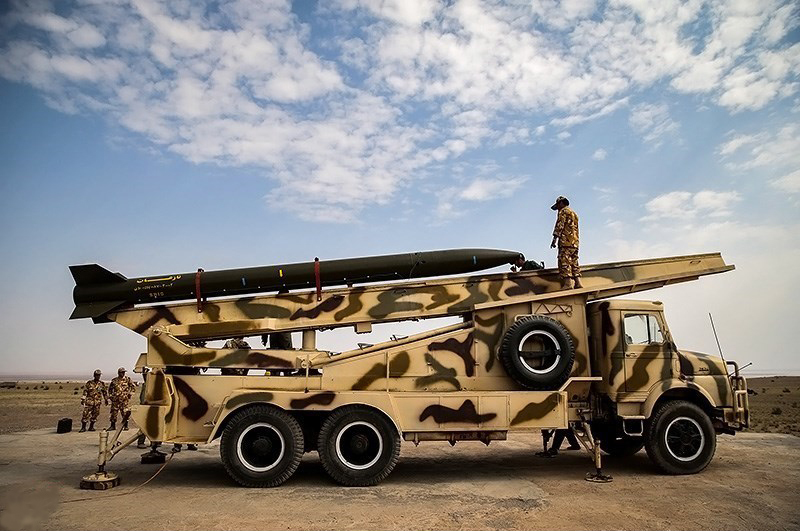
- Type: Artillery rocket

Service history
- Used by: Iran; Syria

Production history
- Manufacturer: Iran
- Variants: Naze'at 4 Naze'at 5 Naze'at 6 Naze'at 10

Specifications
- Engine: Solid fuel rocket
- Operational range: 100–130 km
- Accuracy: CEP less than 5% of its range
- Launch platform: Transporter erector launcher

The Naze'at 6-H and Naze'at 10-H/Mushak-120/Iran-130 (Persian: نازعات lit. Those Who Pull Out, in reference to the angels who tear out the souls of the wicked) are two Iranian long-range artillery rockets with ranges of about 100 km. The Naze'at 10-H is larger, more powerful, and has a longer range than the Nazeat 6-H. Like Iran's similar shaped Zelzal rockets, Naze'at rockets do not have a guidance system. Both systems are also widely known without the -H suffix, as the Naze'at 6 and Naze'at 10. The Iranians also have developed another 500 kg version called the Mushak-160 with 160 km range.

== History ==
The Naze'at family was developed during the 1980s with Chinese assistance in an attempt to build an equivalent of the FROG-7 missile.

== Specifications ==
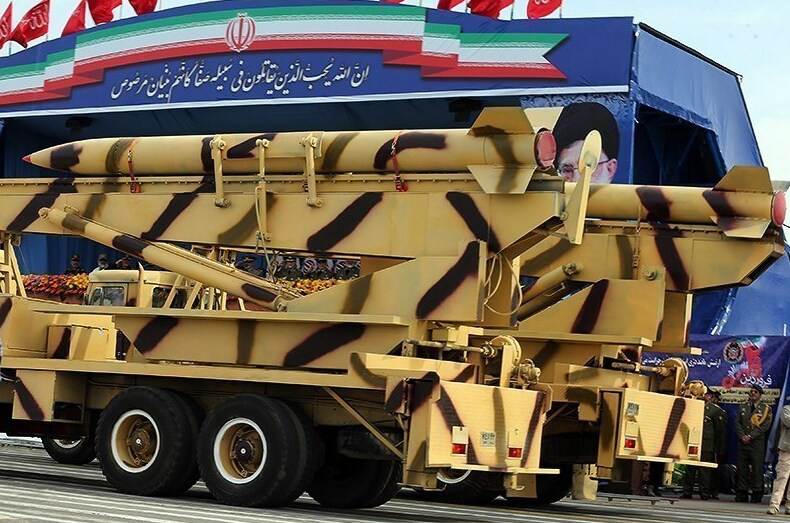
A Naze'at 6-H

Naze'at 6-H rocket

- Max. range (km): 100
- Min. range (km): 80
- Length (mm): 6290
- Diameter (mm): 356
- Initial weight (kg): 960
- Warhead weight (kg): 130
- C.E.P (%): <5% Max. range
- Average Action Time (s): 9
- Specific Impulse (s): 240
- Propellant Weight (kg): 420
- Type of Propellant: Solid (HTPB)
- Service life: 7 years

Naze'at 10-H rocket

- Max. range (km): 130
- Min. range (km): 110
- Length (mm): 8020
- Diameter (mm): 457
- Initial weight (kg): 1830
- Warhead weight (kg): 230
- C.E.P (%): <5% Max. range
- Average Action Time (s): 10
- Specific Impulse (s): 240
- Propellant Weight (kg): 865
- Type of Propellant: Solid (HTPB)
- Service life: 7 years

== Details ==
The Naze'at is launched from a transporter erector launcher (TEL) and carries a conventional warhead, and potentially a chemical or biological one. A complete Naze'at system includes a TEL and communications vans, meteorological vans, and a GPS system for surveying the launch site. Both Naze'at rockets have a closing speed of Mach 4–5. The reliability and accuracy of Naze'at rockets is assessed as poor.

The Naze'at has fins for stabilization in flight and is believed to have a CEP of around 500–1000 m, which is considered poor. There are multiple different TELs used for Naze'at rockets.

== Operators ==
- Iran
- Syria

== See also ==
- Zelzal-1
- Zelzal-2
- Zelzal-3
- Islamic Revolutionary Guard Corps Aerospace Force
- Defense industry of Iran
- List of equipment of the Iranian Army
