= Šumadija (multiple rocket launcher) =

Serbian self-propelled multiple rocket launcher

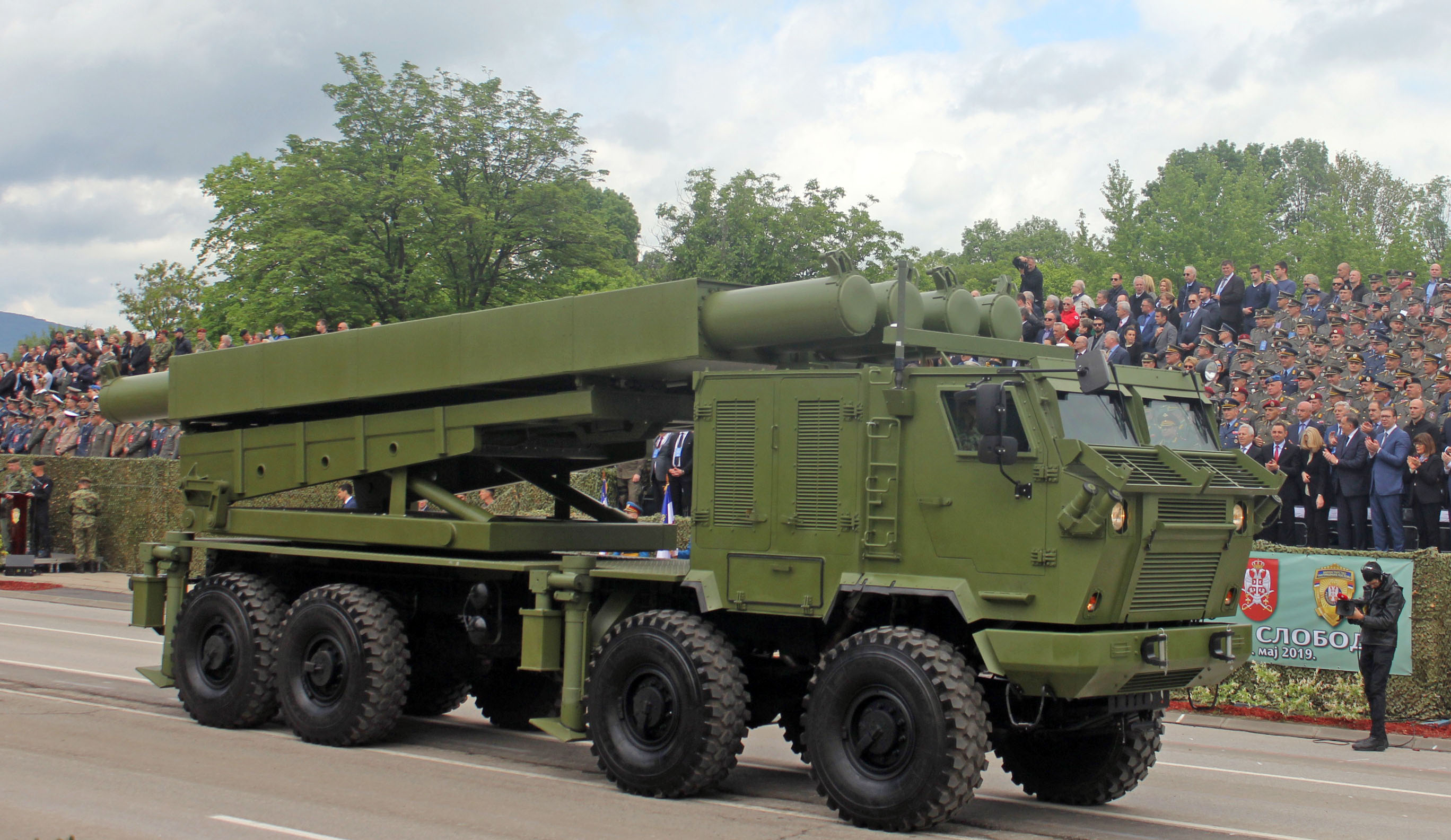
- Šumadija MLRS during 2019 military parade in Niš
- Type: Self-propelled multiple rocket launcher
- Place of origin: Serbia

Production history
- Designer: Military Technical Institute
- Manufacturer: Yugoimport SDPR, EDePro, Krušik
- Produced: 2017–present

Specifications
- Mass: 38t
- Length: 11 m (36 ft 1 in)
- Width: 2.95 m (9 ft 8 in)
- Height: 3.45 m (11 ft 4 in)
- Crew: 4
- Main armament: 2 modules x2 total 4 rockets 400mm - 285km range or 2 modules x6 total 12 rockets 262mm - 75km range
- Maximum speed: 100 km/h (62 mph)

The Šumadija is a Serbian self-propelled multiple rocket launcher in development since 2017. A modular design based on a Kamaz chassis, it can launch four 400mm rockets up to 285 km or twelve 262mm rockets up to 75 km. It is named after the Šumadija region in central Serbia.

== History ==
The development of the system was partially based on the experience gained on M-87 Orkan and KOL 15 - VERA 120 km 400mm rocket launchers developed by the Military Technical Institute in the 1980s and further development of these projects in the 1990s and 2000s.

== Characteristics ==
One battery usually consist of 3–6 launchers per division or 9–8 launchers per battalion or regiment. Included in formations is command, reload, communication, workshop and fuel vehicles together with combat support vehicles type of BOV M16 Miloš that protects unit on march or in battle position against close enemy threats.

Using modern C4I2 battle management software together with UAV for guidance and observation, satellite, radar and other surveillance data and thanks to high missile precision it is very effective weapon for destroying command centers, airports, large enemy army groups and other valuable targets.

Šumadija on display at Partner 2017 military fair

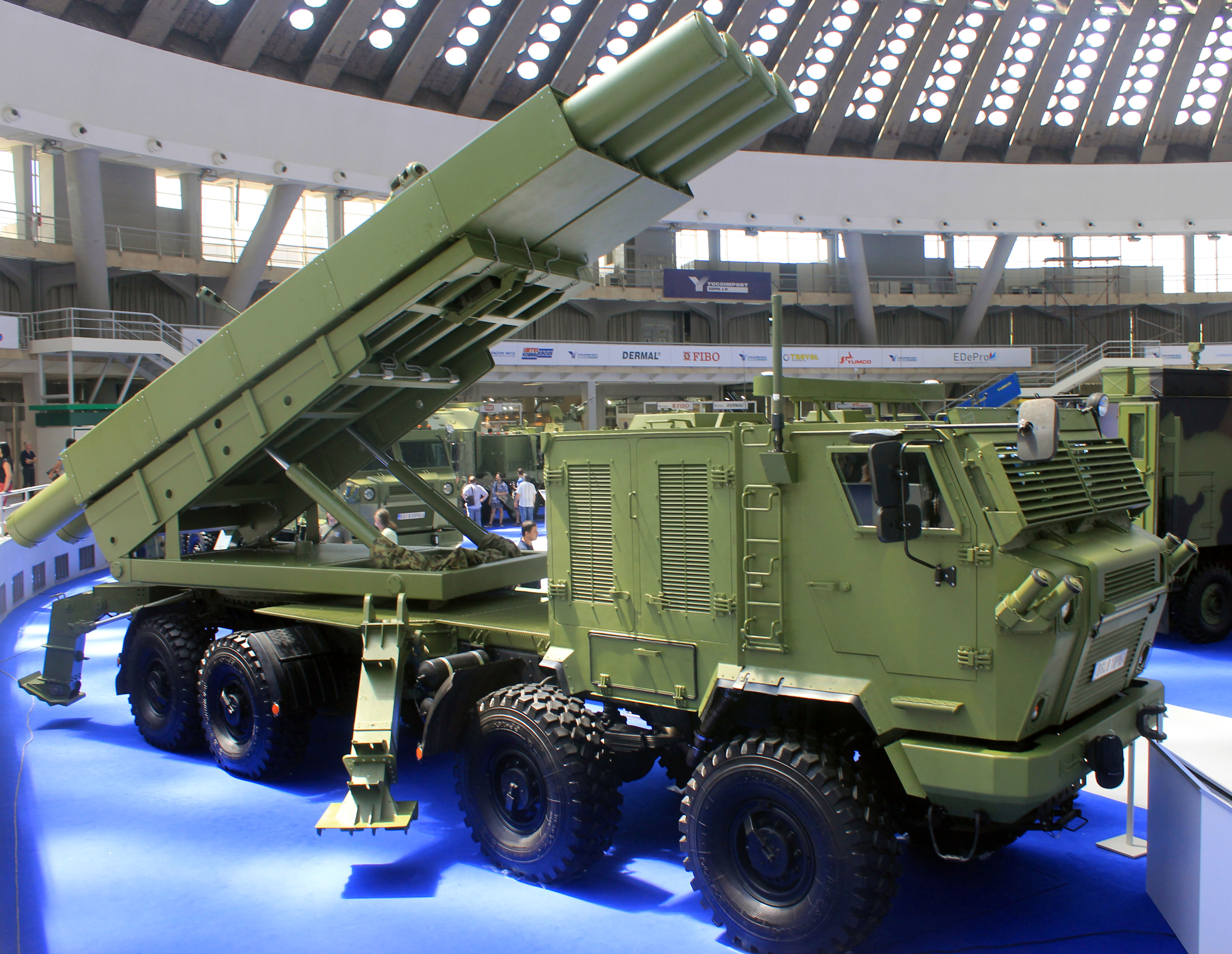

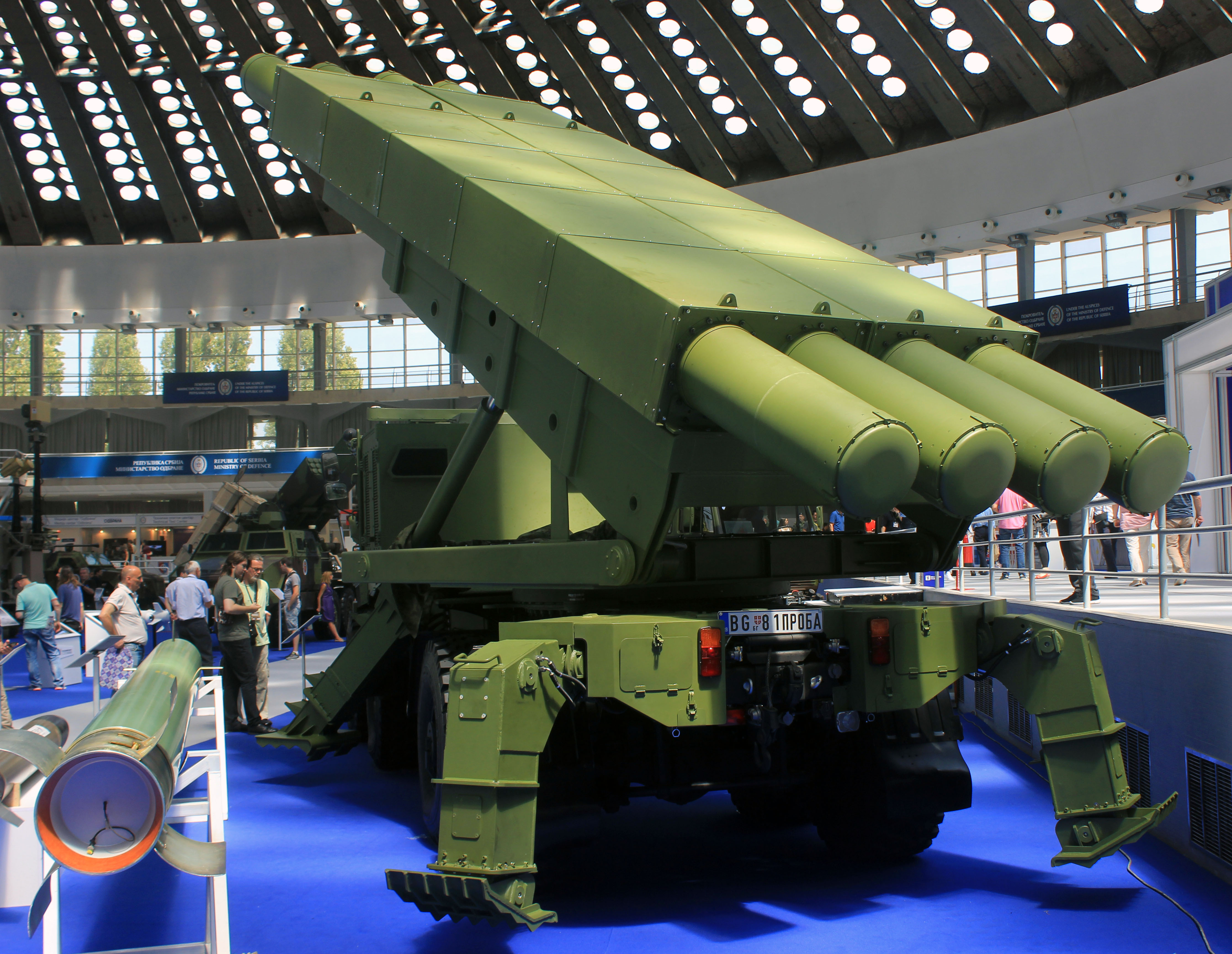

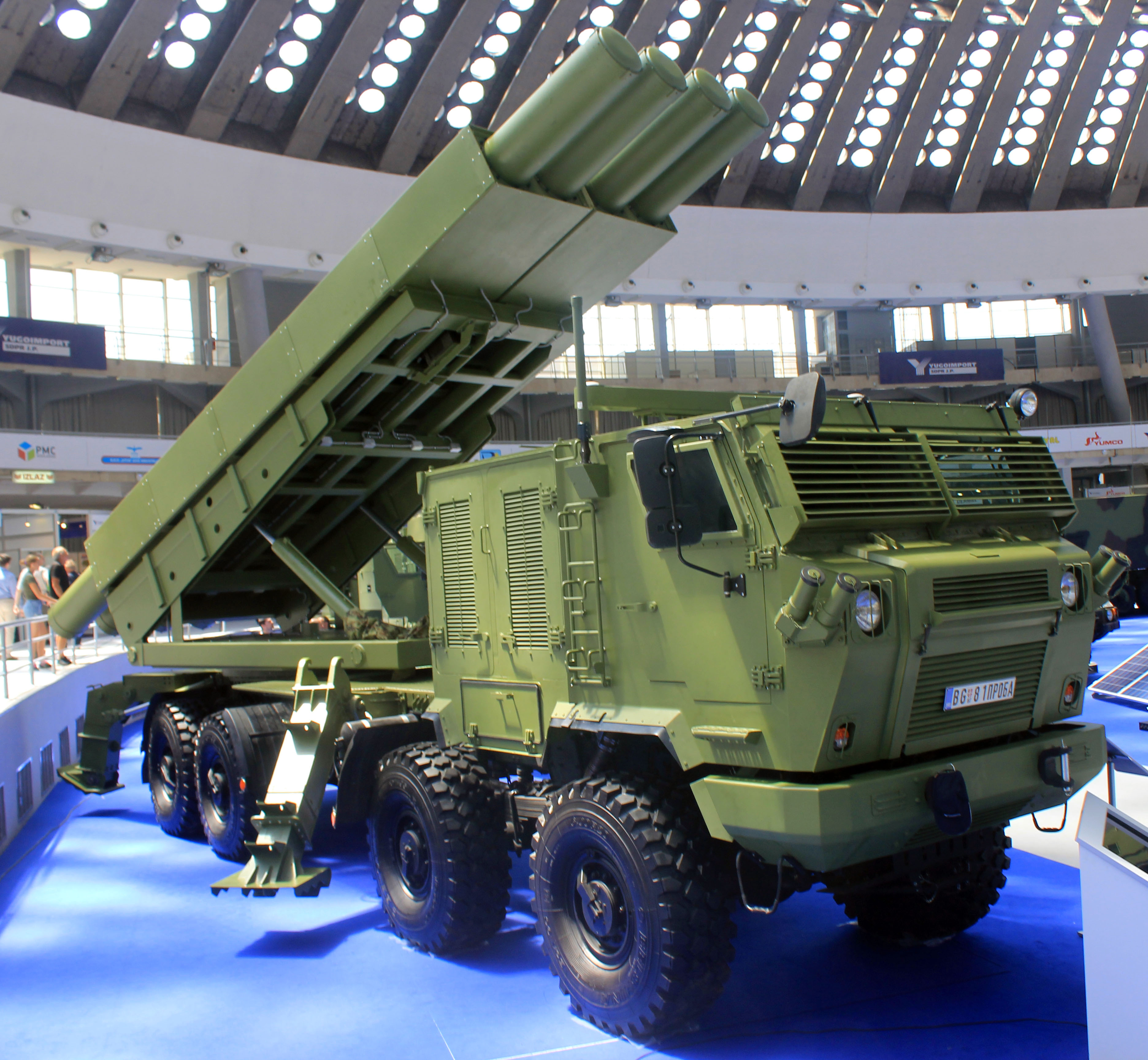

== Rockets ==
The system uses two types of projectiles:

- 400mm tactical ballistic missile originally called "Šumadija" and now "Јерина-1" with range of 285 km and circular error probable less than 150 meters if missile rely only on Inertial navigation system or when using inertial navigation combined with GPS data CEP is less than 50 meters.
- 262mm rocket called "Jerina 2" with range of up to 75 km - this rocket represents direct further development of Orkan MLRS rocket.

Jerina 1 is a 400mm rocket with a correctable trajectory and a 200 kg HE/fragmented warhead, with possible future development of a thermobaric variant. The rocket weighs about 1,550 kg and two rockets in one module weigh 4,200 kg. The rocket uses modern composite fuel and is placed in a steel container module.

Jerina 2 is a 262mm rocket and comes with several types of warheads, including HE/fragmentation and the KB-2 variant with 288 shaped-charge bomblets. It is stored in a steel container module, whose tubes may possibly be used on the LRSVM Morava multiple rocket launcher.

== Comparable systems ==
- LYNX (MRL) – (Israel)
- Astros II MLRS – (Brazil)
- M142 HIMARS – (United States)
- MGM-140B/E ATACMS – (United States)
- OTR-21 Tochka – (Soviet Union)
- T-122 Sakarya – (Turkey)
- Fajr-5 – (Iran)
- TOROS – (Turkey)
- Falaq-2 – (Iran)
