= MGM-18 Lacrosse =

US nuclear-capable tactical missile

MGM-18 (M4) Lacrosse
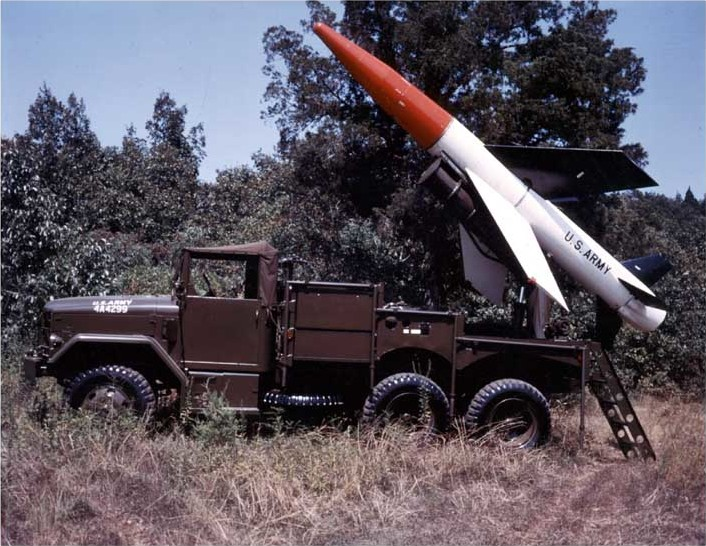
- MGM-18 Lacrosse on an XM-398 Launcher
- Type: Tactical ballistic missile
- Place of origin: United States

Service history
- In service: 1959–1964
- Used by: United States Army
- Wars: Cold War

Production history
- Designer: Johns Hopkins University, Cornell Aeronautical Laboratory
- Designed: 1947–1956
- Manufacturer: The Glenn L. Martin Company
- Produced: 1959–1964
- No. built: Nearly 1200

Specifications
- Mass: 2,300 pounds (1,000 kg)
- Length: 19 feet 2.4 inches (5.852 m)
- Diameter: 20.5 inches (520 mm)
- Wingspan: 9 feet (2.7 m)
- Maximum firing range: 12 miles (19 km)
- Warhead: Explosive or Nuclear
- Warhead weight: 540 pounds (240 kg)
- Blast yield: Explosive or 1.5–10 kt Nuclear using the W40 nuclear warhead
- Propellant: Thiokol XM10 or XM10E1 solid-fuel rocket
- Maximum speed: Mach 0.8
- Guidance system: Radio Command guidance
- Launch platform: XM-398 transporter/launcher truck

The MGM-18 Lacrosse was a short-ranged tactical weapon intended for close support of ground troops. Its first flight test was in 1954 and was deployed by the United States Army beginning in 1959, despite being still in the development stage. The program's many technical hurdles proved too difficult to overcome and the missile was withdrawn from field service by 1964.

== History ==
=== Development ===
The Lacrosse project began with a United States Marine Corps requirement for a short-range highly accurate guided missile to supplement conventional field artillery. The Navy's Bureau of Ordnance issued contracts to both the Johns Hopkins University Applied Physics Laboratory and the Cornell Aeronautical Laboratory in September 1947, for the study of design aspects pertaining to this mission. Initial planning involved a missile which could be fired from a ship or land launcher. Preset guidance would guide the missile until terminal guidance by a forward observer could take over. Then command guidance would be used to provide a circular probable error of not more than 15 feet (4.6 m).

The missile system was named the Lacrosse because it employed a forward observation station which had a direct view of the target. The forward observation station was mounted on a jeep and after the missile was launched control was passed to the forward station for final guidance to the target. Hence the name Lacrosse which is how the game of lacrosse is played with the ball being passed to players closer to the goal.

Project Lacrosse was established by the U.S. Marine Corps in 1947 at the Applied Physics Laboratory, Johns Hopkins University (APL/JHU). Cornell Aeronautical Laboratory, Inc. was selected for the initial study and later became the prime contractor. Initially progress was slow and by 1949 the missile had grown from a derivative of the Lark missile to a much larger weapon carrying a 500 lb (230 kg) warhead. Sight Tracking, Electronic Equipment Ranging (STEER) guidance was selected.

In Late 1949 the Joint Chiefs of Staff established a policy assigning Army Ordnance responsibility for short-ranged surface-to-surface missiles. As a result, in early 1950, the project was transferred from the Navy to the Army's Ordnance Corps and Redstone Arsenal. Cornell and Johns Hopkins continued with the project, with the former having primary responsibility for guidance systems design. The Lacrosse project went from exploratory to development of a weapon in mid-1951.

During the next years the Lacrosse system was plagued by funding restrictions, and unsolved technical problems which caused schedule slippage and costs. These caused user criticism and loss of confidence in Lacrosse as a practical weapon system. A serious deficiency in coordination by the Office, Chief of Ordnance Corps inhibited development during the mid-1950s.

In 1955, the Glenn L. Martin Company was awarded contracts to participate in research and development and production. Martin would take over much responsibility for the project, as Cornell moved to work on expanding the missile's capabilities beyond the original requirements (particularly in the area of airborne control, funding for which was discontinued in 1959).

Early testing began in 1954 and production prototypes were available the next year. The difficulties encountered by the project are illustrated by the protracted design and testing periods, with the missile not entering into service until July 1959. Problems included reliability concerns and difficulties with guidance, particularly susceptibility to Electronic countermeasure jamming of the guidance signals.

In 1956, the Federal Telecommunications Laboratory began work on a different guidance system, known as MOD 1, which would have improved Lacrosse's performance with regards to electronic countermeasures. MOD 1, however, was terminated in 1959, causing the Marines to withdraw their participation in the project.

Lacrosse was briefly stopped in Fiscal Year 1957 and reinstated 1958 though without funding for production engineering. This funding situation was responsible for many of the deficiencies of Lacrosse I which was fielded. The first units received Lacrosse in 1959, though the system would continue to be in need of development and refinement.

The Lacrosse weapons system was composed of a large number of vehicles and systems aside from the missile itself. There were three trucks, and a jeep, in the firing unit. There was also an extensive forward guidance system composed of a radar, four Missile Guidance System units, and several other units including a 45 kW generator. There was also a large Maintenance section composed of four trucks with trailers. An extensive test program of the final system was mounted at White Sands. During the final development phase in 1958 and 1959 Martin fired 59 missiles. The Artillery Board fired from 1958 to 1960. The Systems Test Division fired 55 from 1958 to 1960. Finally the Army user fired 23 missiles in early 1960. Cold weather testing was conducted at Fort Churchill, Canada in 1958–1959. Despite the many problems and deficiencies the system was improved and accepted for service in mid-1959. Ultimately the Lacrosse would achieve an accuracy of between 0.9 and 2.1 meters, which was far better than the original objective.

From mid-1959 production of Lacrosse systems were maintained on or ahead of schedule. Though training had been in planning since the mid-1950s severe deficiencies existed for the first 18 months when the Lacrosse system was deployed. Deployment was to ultimately include one Battalion for training in the United States, seven Battalions were deployed in Europe and one in Korea.

Efforts at improvement of the Lacrosse system continued in 1960 but problems, especially with Electronic Counter Measures continued to plague Lacrosse. On January 4, 1961 the ax fell and the Lacrosse program was established at 3 reduced strength battalions in Europe, 1 in South Korea and 4 in the USA. Inventory was reduced to 95 per battalion from 120 by the end of 1962. Fiscal Year 1962 saw the effective end of the Army's experience with the Lacrosse system. Mary Cagle described the Lacrosse as "technically deficient and unacceptable to the user for which it was developed." In her official Army history of the program she also stated that it was "a victim of financial anemia and acute indecision and inaction.

Nearly 1,200 Lacrosse missiles were produced and deployed at a cost of more than US$2 billion in 1996 dollars (excluding the cost of the nuclear warheads).

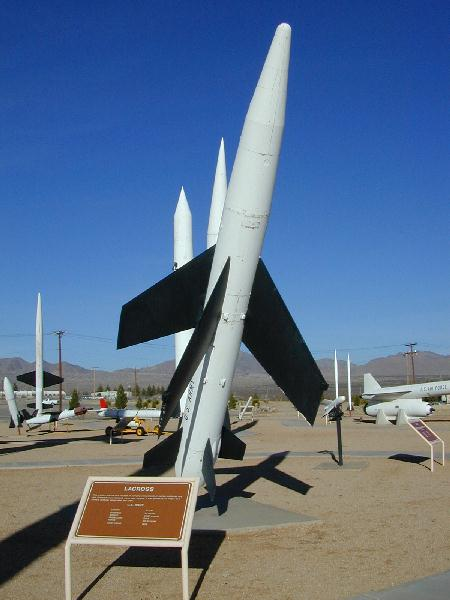
MGM-18 Lacrosse model displayed at the White Sands Missile Range Museum Missile Park

=== Service ===
The first unit to be equipped with Lacrosse was 5th Battalion, 41st Artillery, based at Fort Sill, Oklahoma. In total, eight battalions would be equipped with Lacrosse, with most going to Europe, except one to Korea and one retained by the Strategic Army Corps.

=== Designations ===
The original Navy project was assigned the designator SSM-N-9. When transferred to the Army, the program became SSM-G-12, which changed to SSM-A-12 after minor changes in the Army's designation scheme. When adopted into service, the weapon system was referred to as M-4 and only gained its MGM-18A designation months before being declared obsolete.

== See also ==
Related lists

- List of military aircraft of the United States
- List of missiles
- List of United States M- sequence missiles

== See also ==
Related lists

- List of military aircraft of the United States
- List of missiles
- List of United States M- sequence missiles
