= Oghab =

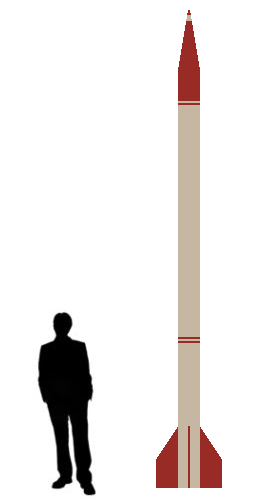
- Type: Rocket artillery

Service history
- In service: 1985–present
- Used by: Iran

Production history
- Manufacturer: Aerospace Industries Organization, Shahid Bagheri Industries

Specifications
- Mass: 360 kg (790 lb)
- Length: 4.82 m (15.8 ft)
- Diameter: 23 cm (9.1 in)
- Warhead: Up to three
- Engine: Solid-fuel rocket
- Operational range: 34–45 km (21–28 mi)
- Maximum speed: 750 m/s (2,500 ft/s)
- Guidance system: None
- Accuracy: In excess of 500 m (550 yd) CEP

The Iranian Oghab (Persian: عقاب, meaning "Eagle") sometimes spelled as Akab and Okab missile is an unguided 230 mm (9.1 in) artillery rocket with a range of 34–45 km (21–28 mi). It is spin-stabilized in flight but has a proven circular error probable in excess of 500 metres (1,600 feet), making it a highly inaccurate weapon. It carries a 70 kg (150 lb) high explosive fragmentation warhead, though it may also be able to carry chemical warheads. According to US sources, a modified version has been developed that could be carried and fired from Iranian Air Force F-14 Tomcat and F-4 Phantom II aircraft. The launcher is an elevatable triple-rail launcher assembly fitted to a Mercedes-Benz LA 911B 4×4 truck chassis.

== History ==
The missile was developed from the Chinese Type-83 artillery rocket during the Iran–Iraq War, with the assistance of the People's Republic of China under an agreement signed in 1985. It entered service in 1986 and was immediately used in combat in an attack on the Iraqi city of Basra in December 1986. Around 260–270 Oghabs were reportedly fired during the war, though their effectiveness was limited. The missile's short range confined its use to attacks on Iraqi border cities and its lack of accuracy meant that Oghab attacks were far less effective than artillery barrages.

The Oghab was used by the Iranian Army and the Revolutionary Guards. It is known to have been exported to Hezbollah.

== Variants ==
The Houthi al-Najm al-Thaqib (missile) also shows similarities to the oghab missile. It has not been seen since the Iran-Iraq War and is believed to be out of service.
