= Al-Najm al-Thaqib =

Missile system used by the Houthis

Al-Najm al-Thaqib/النجم الثاقب
- Type: Rocket artillery
- Place of origin: Yemen

Service history
- Used by: Houthis
- Wars: Yemeni Civil War (2015–present)

Production history
- Variants: al-Najm al-Thaqib-1 al-Najm al-Thaqib-2

Specifications
- Length: 3 metres
- Operational range: al-Najm al-Thaqib 1-45 km al-Najm al-Thaqib 2-75 km

The al-Najm al-Thaqib (Arabic:النجم الثاقب, "piercing star") is a Yemeni missile system developed by the Houthis and revealed on 26 May 2015. The Houthis claimed that these missiles could violate the blockade imposed by UN resolution 2216 imposed by the Arab Coalition. American reports suggest that this missile was designed to attack nearby targets like Jizan without expending their diminishing stock of longer range missiles. It is somewhat similar to Iranian Oghab missiles, however it lacks fins. All civil airports in Jizan, Asir and Najran have been closed due to the risk of missile strikes since July 2015.

== Characteristics ==
=== Al-Najm al-Thaqib 1 ===
Al-Najm al-Thaqib 1 has a range of 45 km and a warhead of 50 kg explosive.

=== Al-Najm al-Thaqib 2 ===
Al-Najm al-Thaqib 2 has a range of 75 km and a warhead of 75 kg explosive.
