= Zelzal-3 =

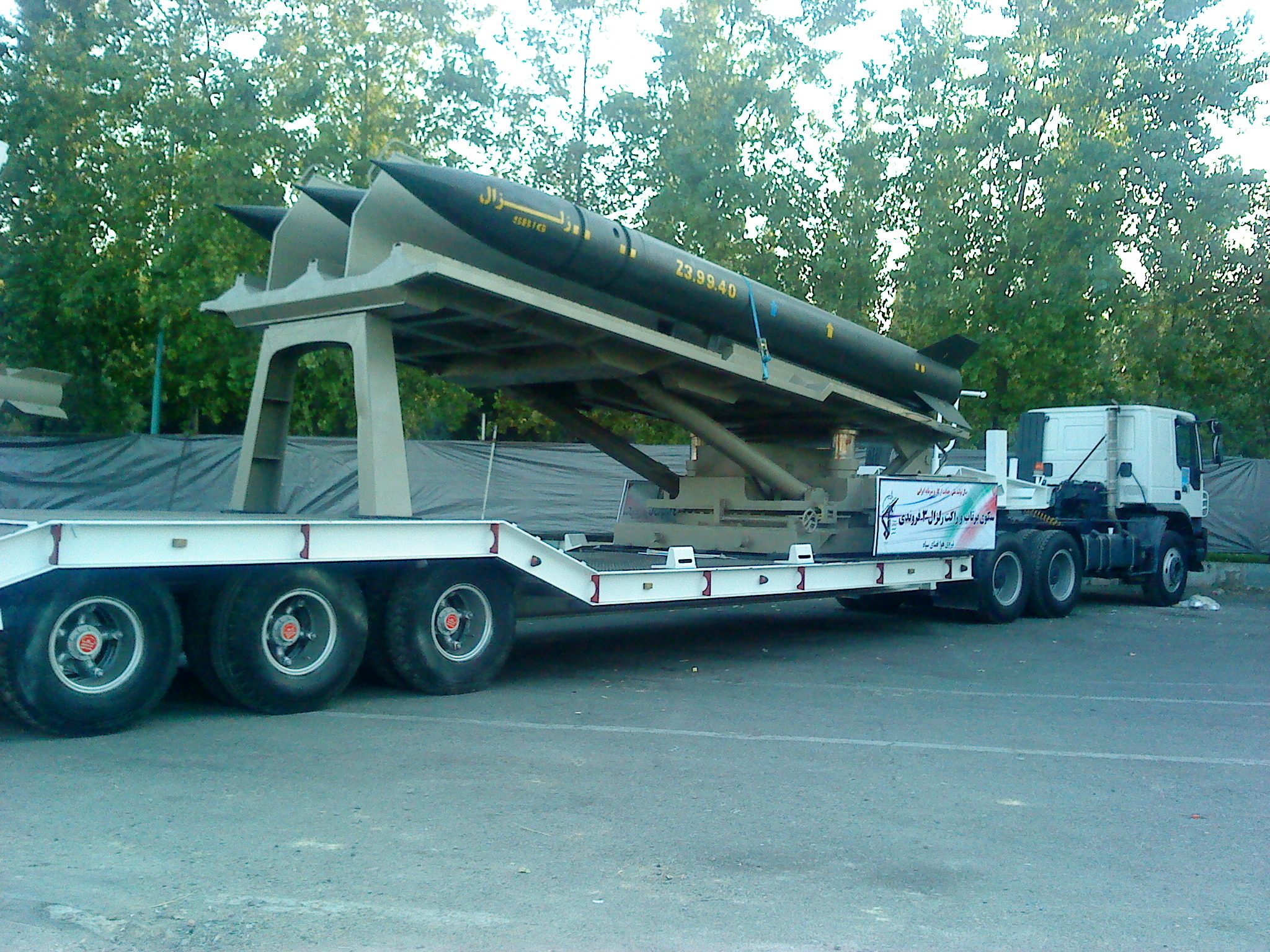
- Zelzal-3 rockets and launcher
- Type: Artillery rocket

Service history
- In service: 2007–present
- Used by: See § Operators
- Wars: Yemeni Civil War (2015–present); Saudi Arabian-led intervention in Yemen

Production history
- Manufacturer: Iran

Specifications
- Mass: 3.6–3.87 tonnes depending on model.
- Length: 9–9.6 m depending on model
- Diameter: 610 mm
- Warhead: One
- Engine: Solid
- Operational range: 250–400 km depending on model
- Guidance system: Inertial plus GPS
- Launch platform: Transporter erector launcher

Zelzal-3 (Persian: زلزال-۳, meaning "earthquake") is an Iranian-made solid propellant guided artillery rocket with a range of 200 km. It is an upgrade of the Zelzal-2 rocket with slightly improved range and was first shown to the public in 2007. A variant, the Zelzal-3B, has a smaller warhead and a range of 250 km. The shape and dimensions of the Zelzal-3 are nearly identical with previous versions except that the nosecone is cone shaped rather than the dome shaped Zelzal-1 and Zelzal-2. The Zelzal-3 has received little use as the much more accurate Fateh-110 missile was also developed from the Zelzal-2.

== Background ==
Zelzal series rockets, along with Naze'at series rockets, are Iranian rockets that were designed and built during the Iran-Iraq war. According to Iranian sources, later on, Fateh-110 generation missiles were designed and built from the Zelzal system. Also, this system has been used to build some space probe rockets in Iran.

In 2005, Zelzal-3 rockets were classified by the Congressional Research Service as "under development." The rocket would later be revealed in 2007.

== Technical specifications ==
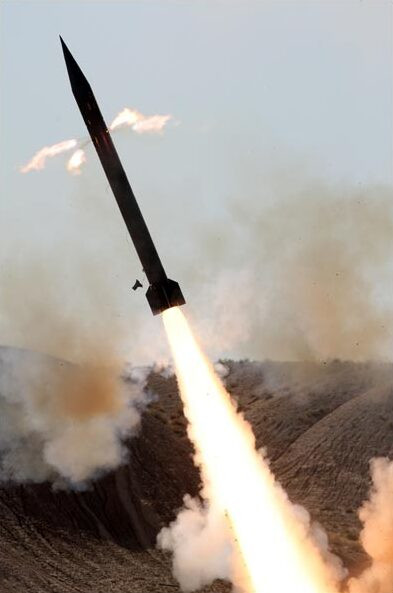
Rocket launch in 2009

Zelzal-3 has a length of 9.6 meters and a diameter of 616 mm. The weight of this missile is 3870 kg, of which 900 kg is the warhead and 1980 kg is the fuel. The error rate of this missile has been reported below 5%. This rocket has the power to have a maximum range of 200 kilometers. These rockets can be launched from mobile and fixed launchers and are installed on triple and single launchers.

The appearance of this rocket includes a cylindrical body, four trapezoidal wings at the end of the body and rotating rocket engines in front of the nose section. The nose of this missile, unlike its two previous generations, is a simple cone. In the third generation, while the length and diameter of the rocket has increased, its mass has also increased. The use of this missile has been considered to attack wide targets such as airport runways.

=== Zelzal-3B variant ===
For the Zelzal 3 rocket, two initial models and an unreleased version have been reported. The two examples introduced in this generation have two different approaches, one with a 50% increase in warhead mass to achieve greater destructive power (with a slight reduction in range) and the other with an increase in range. In version B, the length of the missile is 9 meters and its width is 616 mm. The range of this missile has increased to 250 km and its weight is 3,600 kg.

== Operators ==
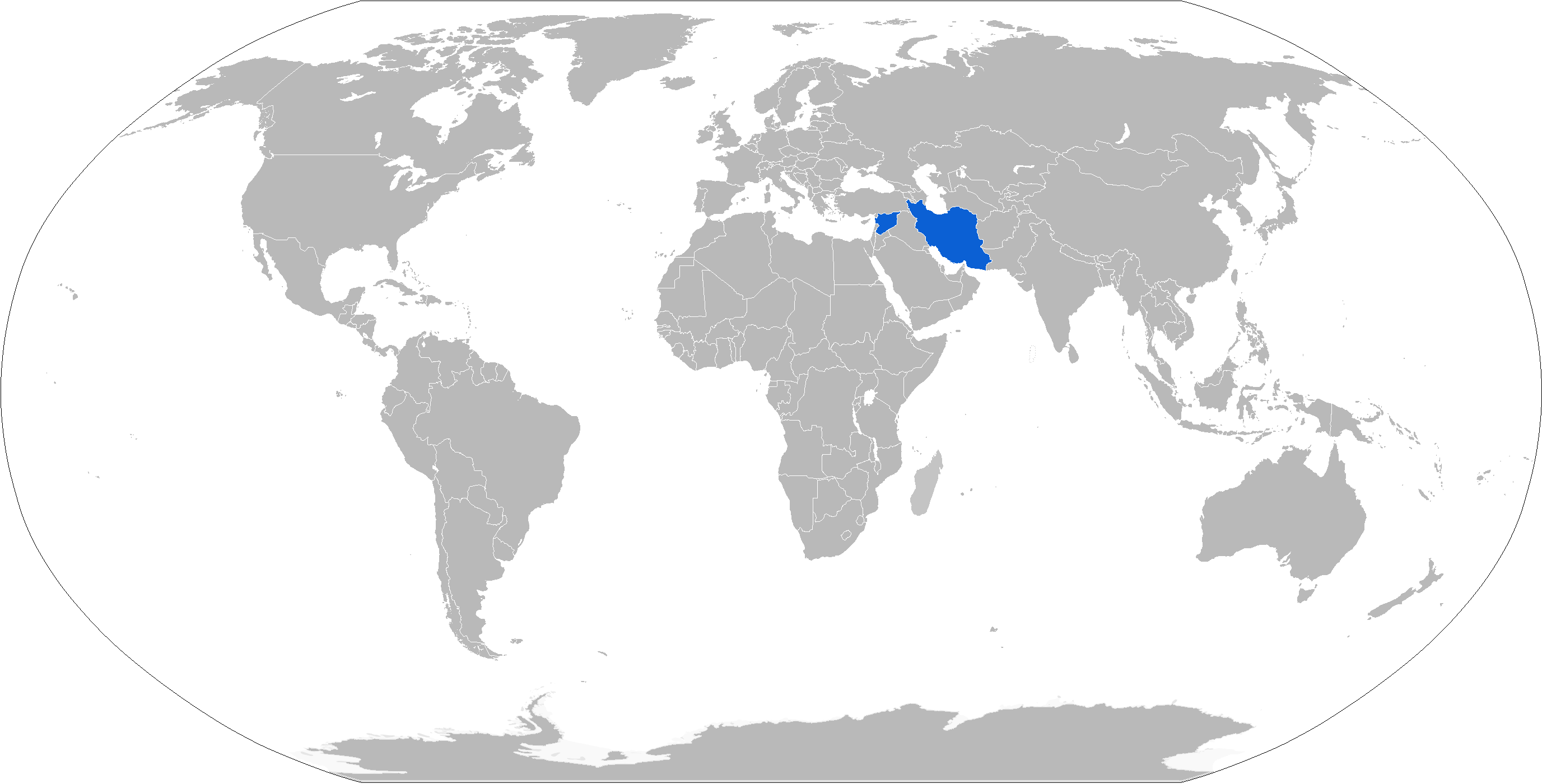
Map with Zelzal-3 operators in blue

- Iran
- Syria

Houthis have a rocket they call the Zelzal-3, which they claim it is locally-made and not imported from Iran.

== See also ==
- Zelzal-1
- Zelzal-2
- Fateh-110
- Military of Iran
- Iran's missile forces
- Iranian military industry
- Current Equipment of the Iranian Army
