= Zelzal-1 =

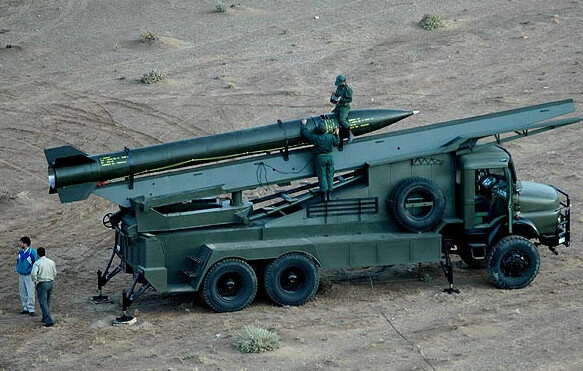
- Zelzal-1 rocket being prepared for launch during IRGC Great Prophet II military exercise
- Type: Artillery rocket
- Place of origin: Iran

Service history
- In service: 1990–present
- Used by: Iran, Syria, Hezbollah

Production history
- Manufacturer: Iran

Specifications
- Warhead: One
- Engine: Solid
- Operational range: 160 km
- Launch platform: Transporter erector launcher

Zelzal-1 (Persian: زلزال-۱, meaning "Earthquake-1") is an Iranian-made heavy artillery rocket with an estimated range of 160 km. It is believed to be owned by the Iranian Armed Forces and Hezbollah. The rocket received relatively little use but was the basis for the more successful Zelzal-2 artillery rocket.

== Users ==
- Iran
- Syria
- Hezbollah

== See also ==
- Aerospace Force of the Islamic Revolutionary Guard Corps
- Armed Forces of the Islamic Republic of Iran
- Defense industry of Iran
- Equipment of the Iranian Army
- Fateh-110
- Zelzal-2
- Zelzal-3
