= Zelzal-2 =

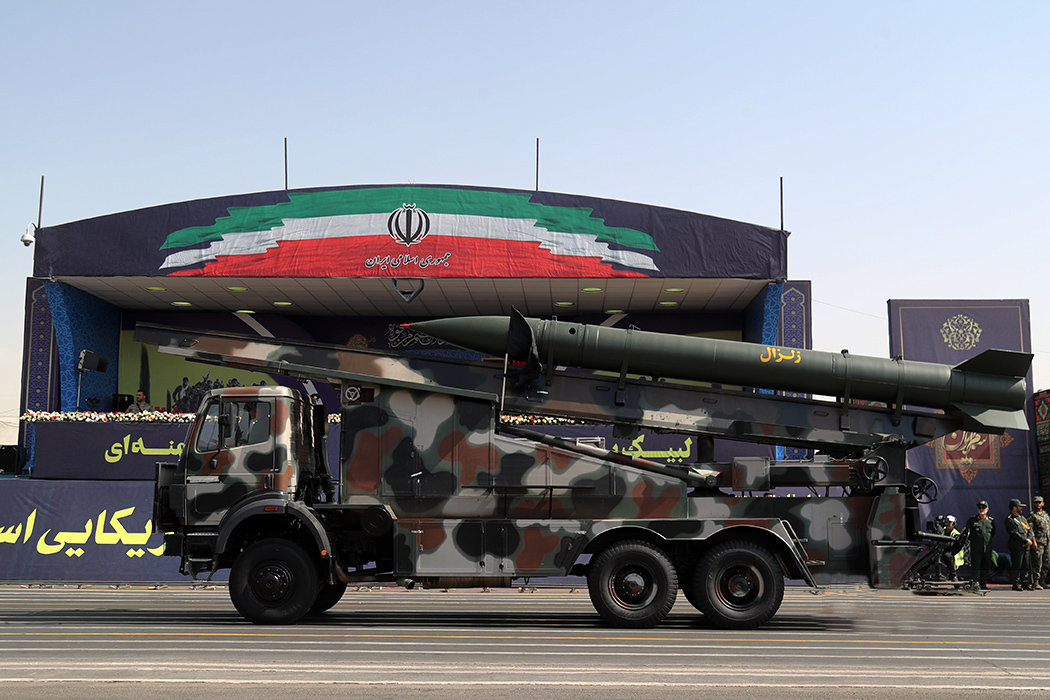
- Missile and TEL display in 2019
- Type: Artillery rocket
- Place of origin: Iran

Service history
- In service: 1998–present
- Used by: See § Operators
- Wars: Syrian Civil War; Yemeni Civil War (2015–present); Saudi Arabian-led intervention in Yemen

Production history
- Variants: See § Variants

Specifications
- Diameter: 610 mm (24 in)
- Maximum firing range: 200 km (120 mi)
- Warhead weight: 600 kg (1,300 lb)
- Propellant: Solid
- Accuracy: 300 m (330 yd)
- Launch platform: Transporter erector launcher

Zelzal-2/Mushak-200 (Persian: زلزال-۲, meaning "Earthquake") is an Iranian unguided long-range artillery rocket. The Zelzal-2 is a 610 mm truck-launched rocket that has a payload of 600 kg and a range of about 200 km. Development of the Zelzal series began in 1990 and the Zelzal-2 was first shown in 1998. It is developed from the Zelzal-1 and was developed into the improved Zelzal-3 artillery rocket and the highly successful Fateh-110 guided missile family. It has been exported to Syria, Hezbollah, and the Houthis, and has seen combat use in the Syrian Civil War and Yemeni Civil War.

The rocket is thought to be based on the Soviet 9K52 Luna-M rocket.

== Variants ==
=== Maysaloun missile ===
A Syrian version of the system, called Maysaloun missile, was named after the Battle of Maysalun. Basic technology of the Syrian version is based on the Iranian Zelzal-2 and was first revealed in 2012.

Basic variant of the missile has the power to have a maximum range of 130 or 210 km and 600 kg warhead weight. The missile has CEP of 300 m, and destruction radius of 600 m in the basic variant. It uses solid-propellant engine and therefore does not require more than 15 minutes to launch. This Syrian missile is a downgraded M-600 missile without the high accuracy targeting system used for less important targets. Improved variants of the missile are tactical short-range ballistic missiles and have a range of 400 km and 600 km.

Manufactured in Syria by the Syrian Scientific Studies and Research Center and Syrian Defense Industries.

== Combat Use ==
Zelzal-2 rockets were fired against Syrian rebels in the Syrian Civil War; the amount used is believed to be small. A small number of Zelzal-2 rockets captured or purchased by Syrian rebel group Jaysh al-Islam were fired against Syrian regime targets on 31 August 2014 and 6 March 2017. They also fired one in September 2015. A Zelzal rocket (unidentified variant) retrofitted with a precision guidance system was reported fired by Lebanese Hezbollah against Tel Aviv on April 2 or April 3 2026.

== Operators ==
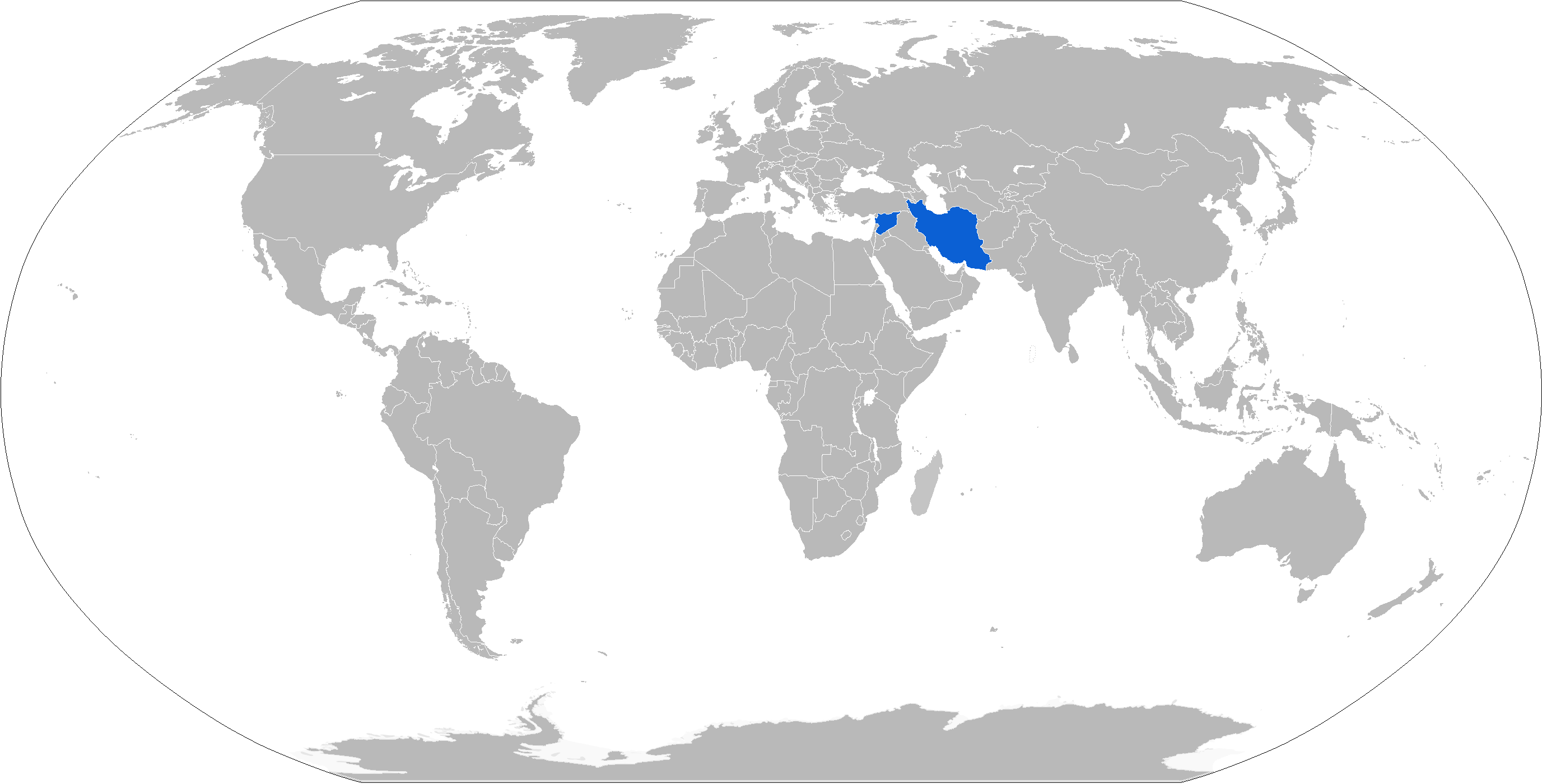
Map with Zelzal-2 operators in blue

=== Current ===
- Iran
- Syria

=== Non-state actors ===
- Hezbollah
- Houthis

== See also ==
- Aerospace Force of the Islamic Revolutionary Guard Corps
- Armed Forces of the Islamic Republic of Iran
- Defense industry of Iran
- Equipment of the Iranian Army
- Fateh-110
- Zelzal-1
- Zelzal-3
