= MIM-104 Patriot =

American surface-to-air missile system since 1981

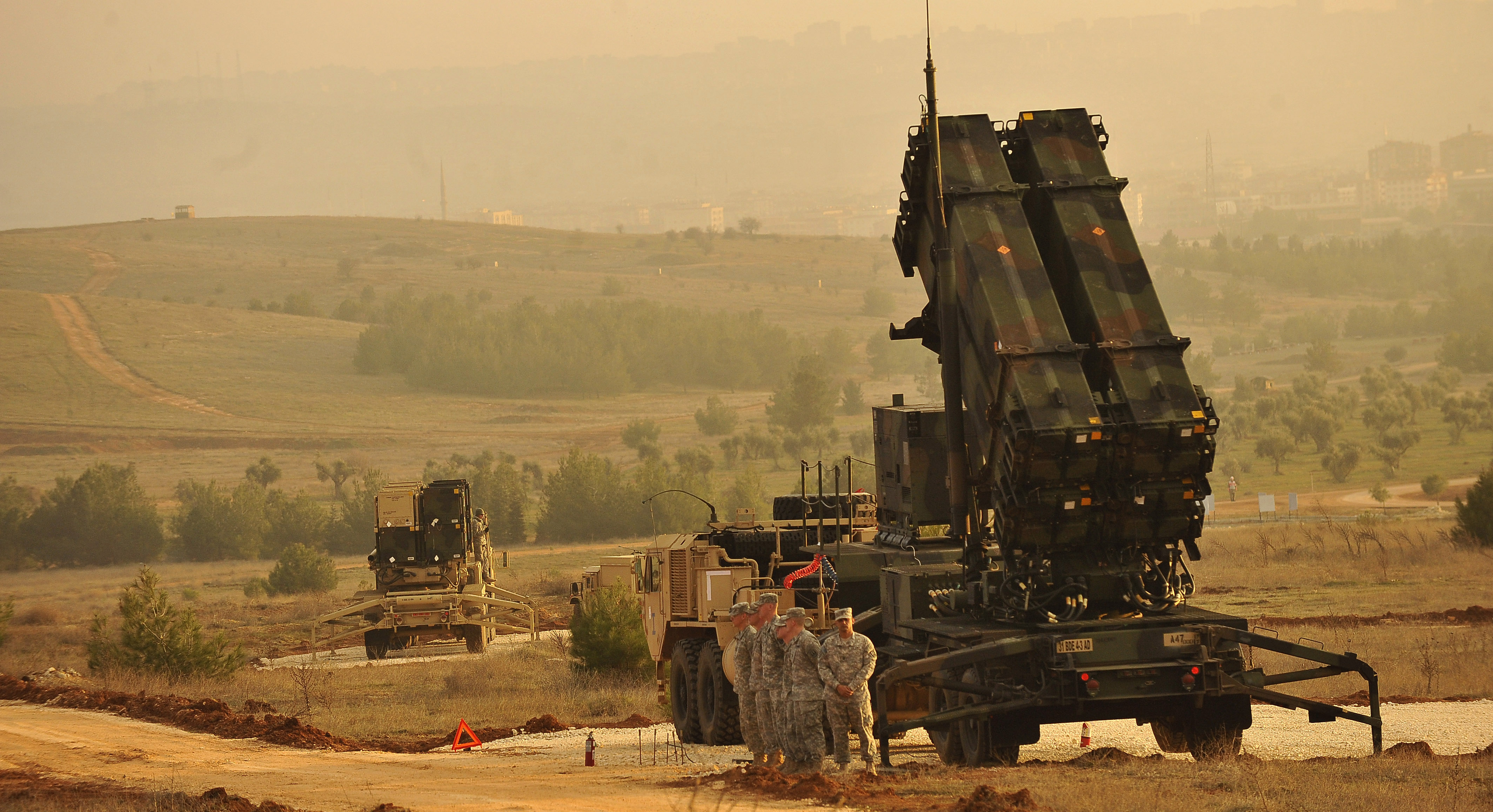
- A Patriot system in Turkey
- Type: Mobile surface-to-air missile/anti-ballistic missile system
- Place of origin: United States

Service history
- In service: Since 1981; initial operational capacity 1984
- Used by: See operators
- Wars: Gulf War; Iraq War; 2006 Lebanon War; 2014 Gaza War; Syrian Civil War; Yemeni Civil War (2014–present); Saudi Arabian-led intervention in Yemen; Houthi–Saudi Arabian conflict Russo-Ukrainian War; Gaza War; Twelve-Day War; 2026 Iran War

Production history
- Designer: Raytheon, Hughes, and RCA
- Designed: 1969
- Manufacturer: Raytheon, Lockheed Martin, and Boeing
- Unit cost: Domestic cost: About US$1.09 billion (FY 2022) for a battery; US$4 million for a single PAC-3 MSE missile Export cost: About US$2.37–2.5 billion for a battery; US$6–10 million (FY 2018) for a single missile
- Produced: 1976–present
- No. built: 1,106 launchers in U.S. (483 were in service in 2010); Over 250 launchers exported to 18 countries; Over 10,000 missiles manufactured
- Variants: See § Variants

Specifications
- Operational range: 160 km (99 mi) (max)
- Maximum speed: PAC-2 GEM+: 5,630 km/h (3,500 mph); PAC-3: 6,170 km/h (3,830 mph)

The MIM-104 Patriot is a mobile interceptor missile surface-to-air missile (SAM) system, the primary such system used by the United States Army and several allied states. It is manufactured by the U.S. defense contractor Raytheon and derives its name from the radar component of the weapon system. The AN/MPQ-53 at the heart of the system is known as the "Phased Array Tracking Radar to Intercept on Target", which is a backronym for "Patriot". In 1984, the Patriot system began to replace the Nike Hercules system as the U.S. Army's primary high to medium air defense (HIMAD) system and the MIM-23 Hawk system as the U.S. Army's medium tactical air defense system. In addition to defending against aircraft, Patriot is the U.S. Army's primary terminal-phase anti-ballistic missile (ABM) system. As of 2016, the system is expected to stay fielded until at least 2040.

Patriot uses an advanced aerial interceptor missile and high-performance radar systems. Patriot was developed at Redstone Arsenal in Huntsville, Alabama, which had previously developed the Safeguard ABM system and its component Spartan and hypersonic Sprint missiles. The symbol for Patriot is a drawing of a Revolutionary War–era minuteman.

The MIM-104 Patriot has been widely exported. Patriot was one of the first tactical systems in the U.S. Department of Defense (DoD) to employ lethal autonomy in combat. The system was deployed in the 1991 Gulf War, and made successful intercepts in the 2003 Iraq War. In August 2014 batteries first downed UAVs when Israeli Air Defense Command engaged two Hamas drones during the 2014 Gaza War. Patriot systems have been used since 2015 by the Saudi and Emirati air forces in the Yemeni Civil War, against Houthi missiles. Since 2023, Ukraine has operated Patriot systems in the Russo-Ukrainian War, downing Russian Su-34 and Su-35 fighters, Mi-8 helicopters, and Kinzhal ballistic missiles.

== Introduction ==
Prior to the Patriot, Raytheon was involved in a number of surface to air missile programs, including FABMDS (Field Army Ballistic Missile Defense System), AADS-70 (Army Air-Defense System – 1970) and SAM-D (Surface-to-Air Missile – Development). In 1975, the SAM-D missile successfully engaged a drone at the White Sands Missile Range. In 1976, it was renamed the PATRIOT Air Defense Missile System. The MIM-104 (Mobile Interceptor Missile 104) Patriot combined several new technologies, including the MPQ-53 passive electronically scanned array radar and track-via-missile guidance.

Full-scale development of the system began in 1976 and it was deployed in 1984. Patriot was used initially as an anti-aircraft system. In 1988, it received an upgrade providing limited capability against tactical ballistic missiles (TBM), designated PAC-1 (Patriot Advanced Capability 1). The most recent upgrade by manufacturer Lockheed Martin, designated PAC-3, is a nearly total system redesign of the interceptor missiles, this time designed from the outset with the capability to engage and destroy tactical ballistic missiles. The Army plans to upgrade the Patriot system as part of the Integrated Air and Missile Defense system designed to tie into a broader air defense architecture using an Integrated Battle Command System (IBCS).

=== Patriot equipment ===
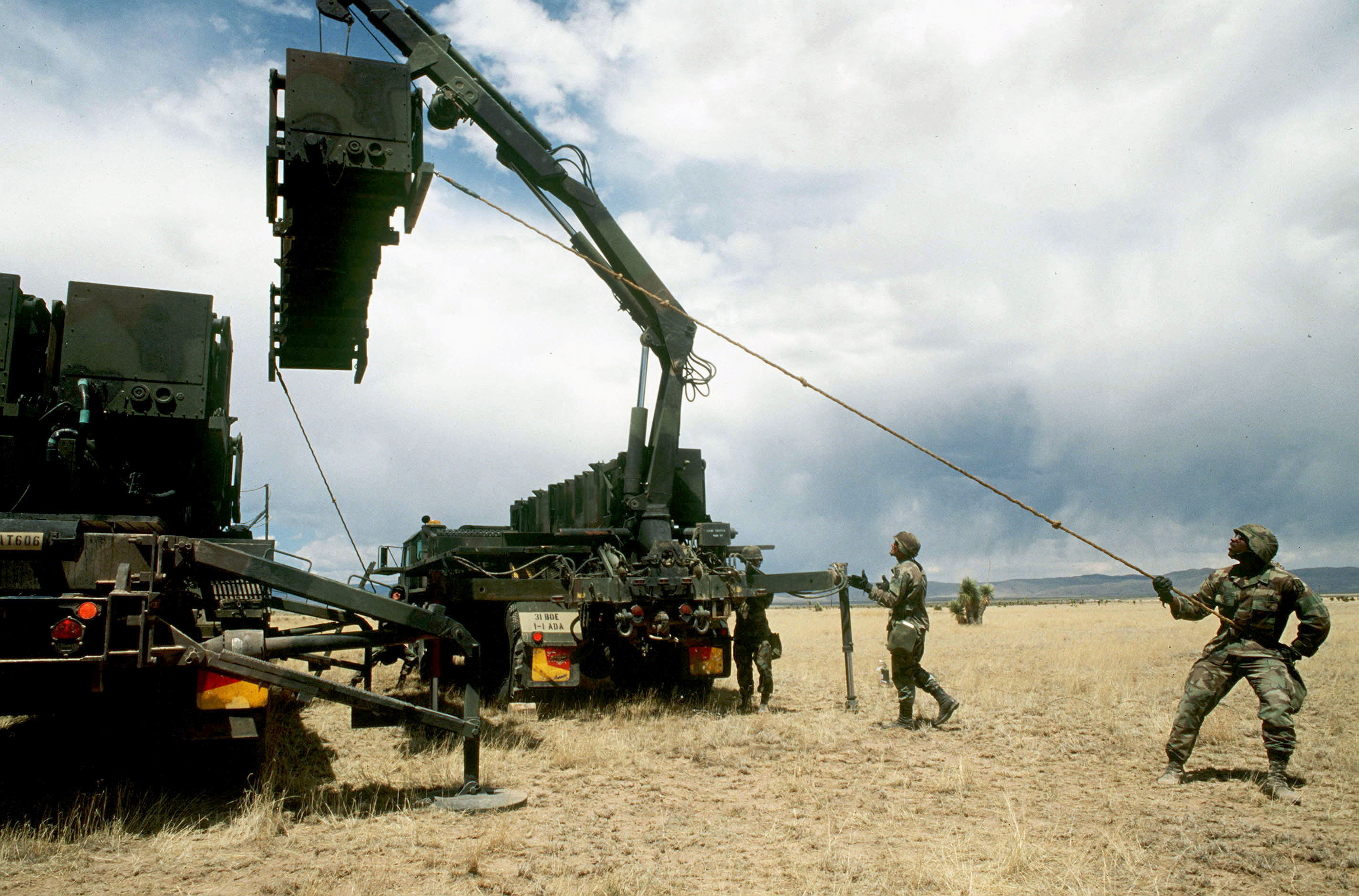
Soldiers conducting reload from a Guided Missile Transporter (GMT)

The Patriot system has four major operational functions: communications, command and control, radar surveillance, and missile guidance. The four functions combine to provide a coordinated, secure, integrated, mobile air defense system.

The Patriot system is modular and highly mobile. A battery-sized element can be installed in less than an hour. All components, consisting of the fire control section (radar set, engagement control station, antenna mast group, electric power plant) and launchers, are truck- or trailer-mounted. The radar set and launchers with missiles are mounted on M860 semi-trailers, which are towed by Oshkosh M983 HEMTTs.

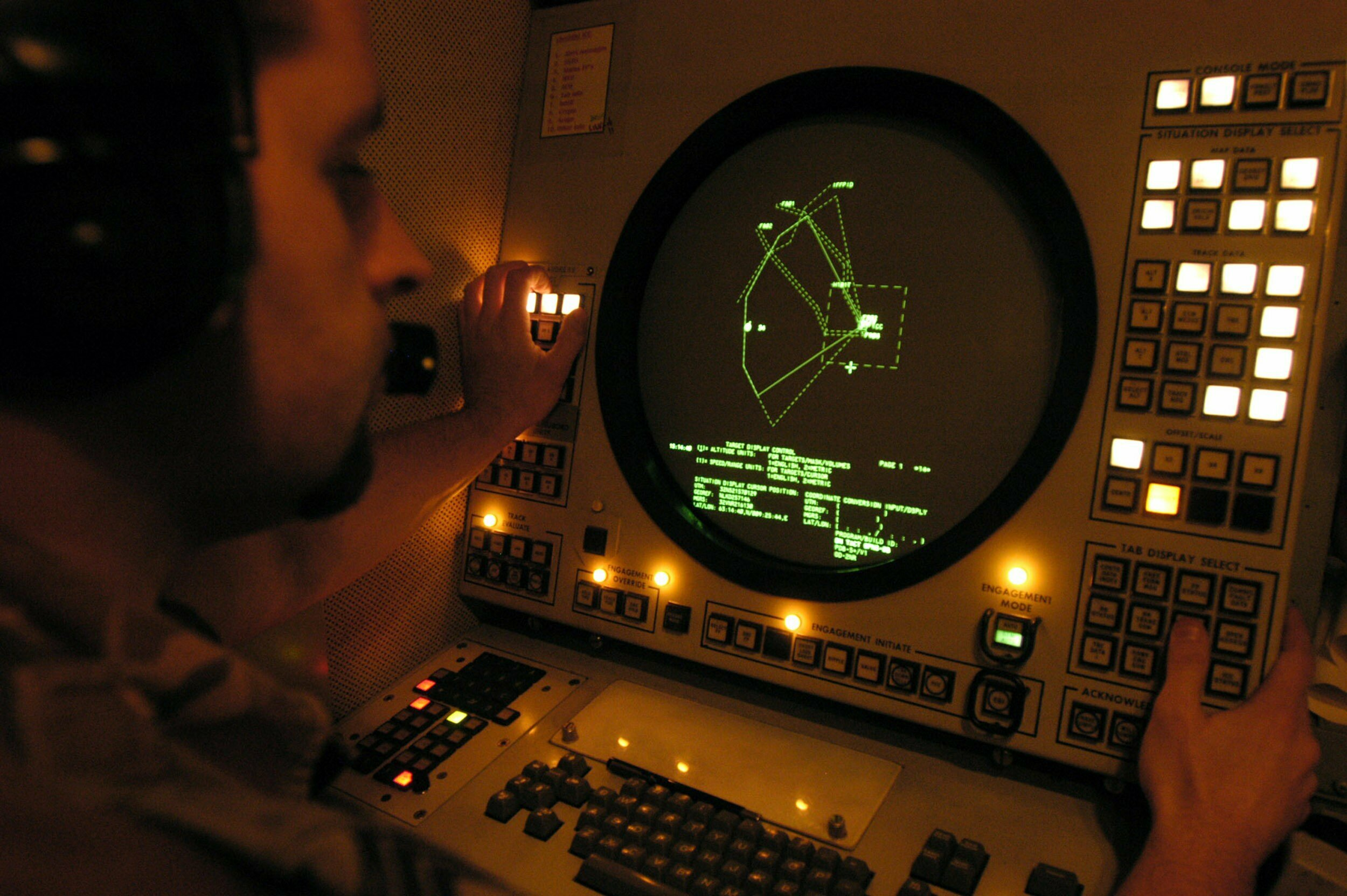
An operator in the Information Coordination Central (ICC) monitors the actions of the battery via his display

Missile reloading is accomplished using a M985 HEMTT truck with a Hiab crane on the back. This crane is larger than the standard Grove cranes found on regular M977 HEMTT and M985 HEMTT cargo body trucks. The crane truck, known as a Guided Missile Transporter (GMT), removes spent missile canisters from the launcher and replaces them with fresh missiles. Because the crane nearly doubles the height of the HEMTT when not stowed, crews informally refer to it as the "scorpion tail". A standard M977 HEMTT with a regular-sized crane is sometimes referred to as the Large Repair Parts Transporter (LRPT).

The heart of the Patriot battery is the fire control section, consisting of the AN/MPQ-53 or −65/65A Radar Set (RS), the AN/MSQ-104 or −132 Engagement Control Station (ECS), the OE-349 Antenna Mast Group (AMG), and the EPP-III Electric Power Plant (EPP). The system's missiles are transported on and launched from either the M901 Launching Station (LS), which can carry up to four PAC-2 missiles; the M902 LS, with sixteen PAC-3 missiles; or the M903 LS, which can be configured to carry PAC-2, PAC-3, and MSE/SkyCeptor missiles in various combinations. A Patriot battalion is also equipped with the Information Coordination Central (ICC), a command station designed to coordinate the launches of a battalion and uplink Patriot to the JTIDS or MIDS network.

==== AN/MPQ-53, -65 and -65A Radar Set ====
The AN/MPQ-53/65 Radar Set is a passive electronically scanned array radar equipped with IFF, electronic counter-countermeasure (ECCM), and track-via-missile (TVM) guidance subsystems. The AN/MPQ-53 Radar Set supports PAC-2 units, while the AN/MPQ-65 Radar Set supports PAC-2 and PAC-3 units. The main difference between these two radars is the addition of a second travelling-wave tube (TWT), which gives the −65 radar increased search, detection, and tracking capability. The radar antenna array consists of over 5,000 elements that "deflect" the radar beam many times per second.

The radar antenna array contains an IFF interrogator subsystem, a TVM array, and at least one "sidelobe canceller" (SLC), which is a small array designed to decrease interference that might affect the radar. Patriot's radar is somewhat unusual in that it is a "detection-to-kill" system, meaning that a single unit performs all search, identification, track, and engagement functions. Most other SAM systems, by contrast, require several different radars to perform all functions necessary to detect and engage targets.

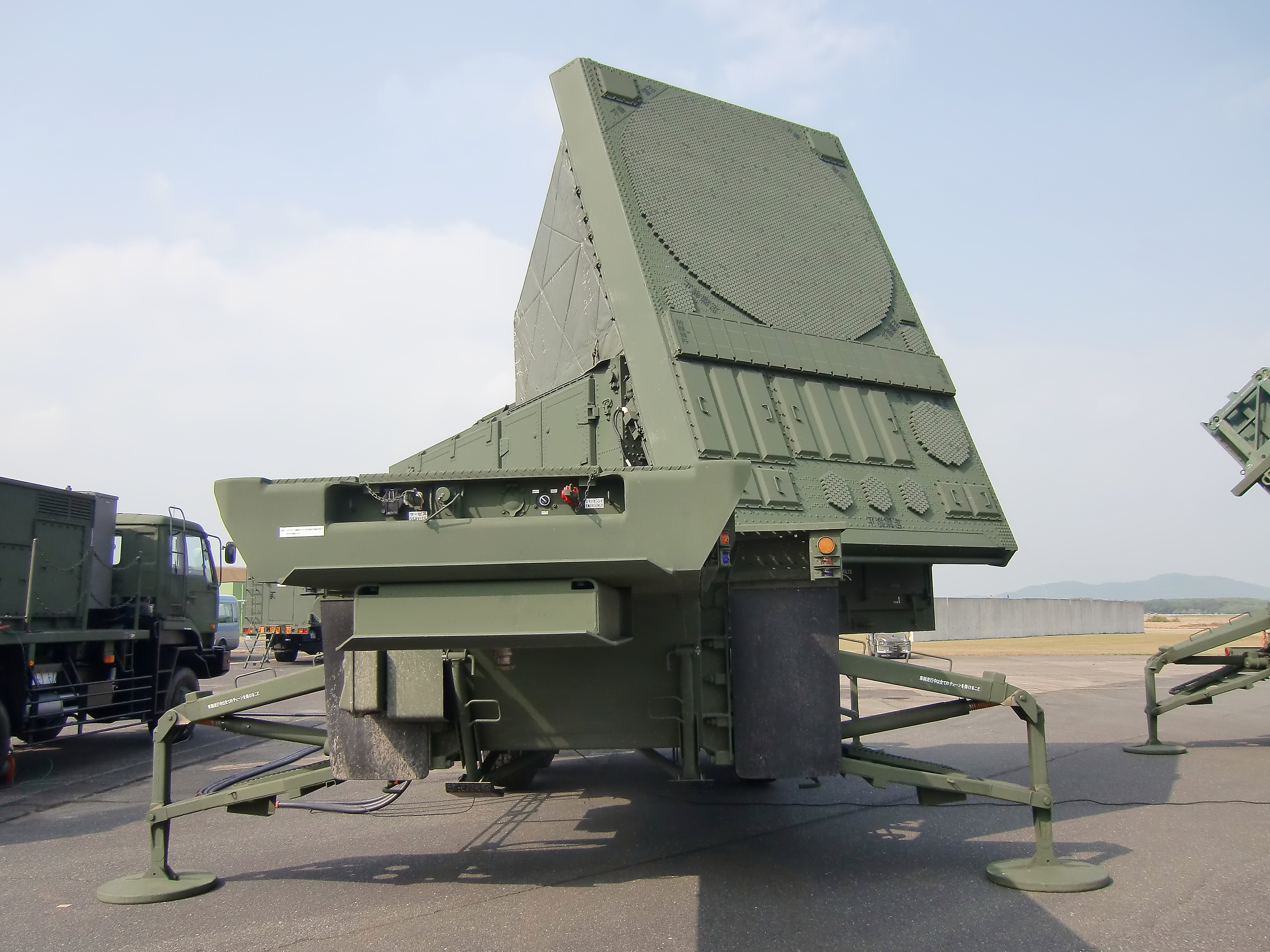
An AN/MPQ-53 Radar Set

The beam created by the Patriot's flat phased array radar is comparatively narrow and highly agile compared to that of a moving dish. This characteristic gives the radar the ability to detect small, fast targets like ballistic missiles, or low radar cross-section targets such as stealth aircraft or cruise missiles. The power and agility of Patriot's radar is also highly resistant to countermeasures, including ECM, radar jamming, and use of RWR equipment. Patriot is capable of quickly changing frequencies to resist jamming. However, the radar can suffer from "blind spots".

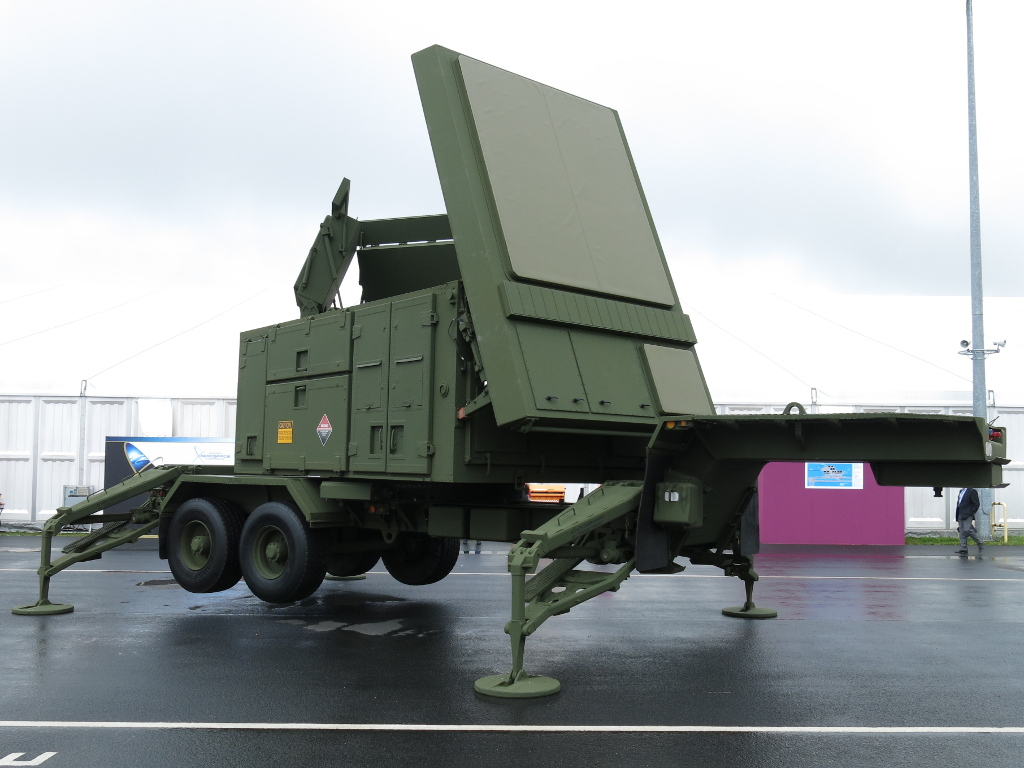
An AN/MPQ-65A AESA radar set

The Army is planning upgrades to the Patriot system's radar components, including a new digital processor that replaces the one used since the system's introduction. In 2017, the Patriot got a new AN/MPQ-65A active electronically scanned array (AESA) radar that has greater range and sharper discrimination. The main gallium nitride (GaN)-based AESA array measures 9 ft × 13 ft (2.7 m × 4.0 m), is a bolt-on replacement for the current antenna, and is oriented toward the primary threat; two new rear panel arrays are a quarter the size of the main array and let the system look behind and to the sides, providing 360-degree coverage. The GaN AESA radar also has up to 50 percent less maintenance costs. Instead of shining a single transmitter through many lenses, the GaN array uses many smaller transmitters, each with its own control, increasing flexibility and allowing it to work even if some transmitters do not.

In October 2017, the Army announced Raytheon's Lower-Tier Air and Missile Defense System (LTAMDS) radar had been selected as the Patriot system's new radar. Unlike the previous radar which could only watch one part of the sky at a time primarily to detect ballistic missiles, the LTAMDS has 360-degree coverage to detect low flying and maneuvering drones and cruise missiles. The design has one large main array flanked by two smaller arrays, with the main panel still focused on high-altitude threats and the side panels, which are half the size with twice the power of the previous radar set, able to detect slower threats from considerable distance. Raytheon was awarded a US$383 million contract to build the first six radars to enter service in 2022.

==== AN/MSQ-104 and -132 Engagement Control Station ====
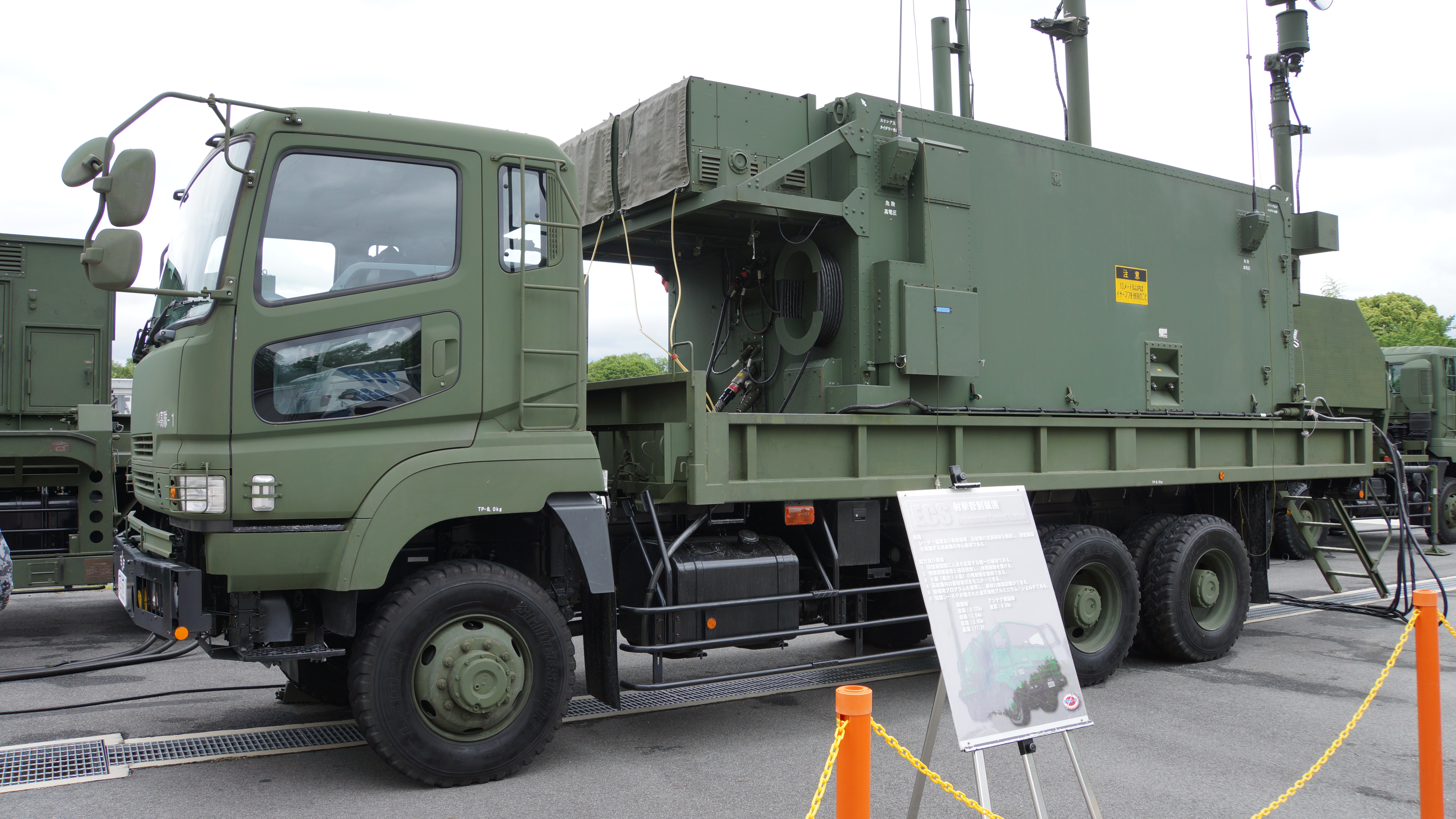
An AN/MSQ-132 ECS vehicle of a Japanese Patriot unit

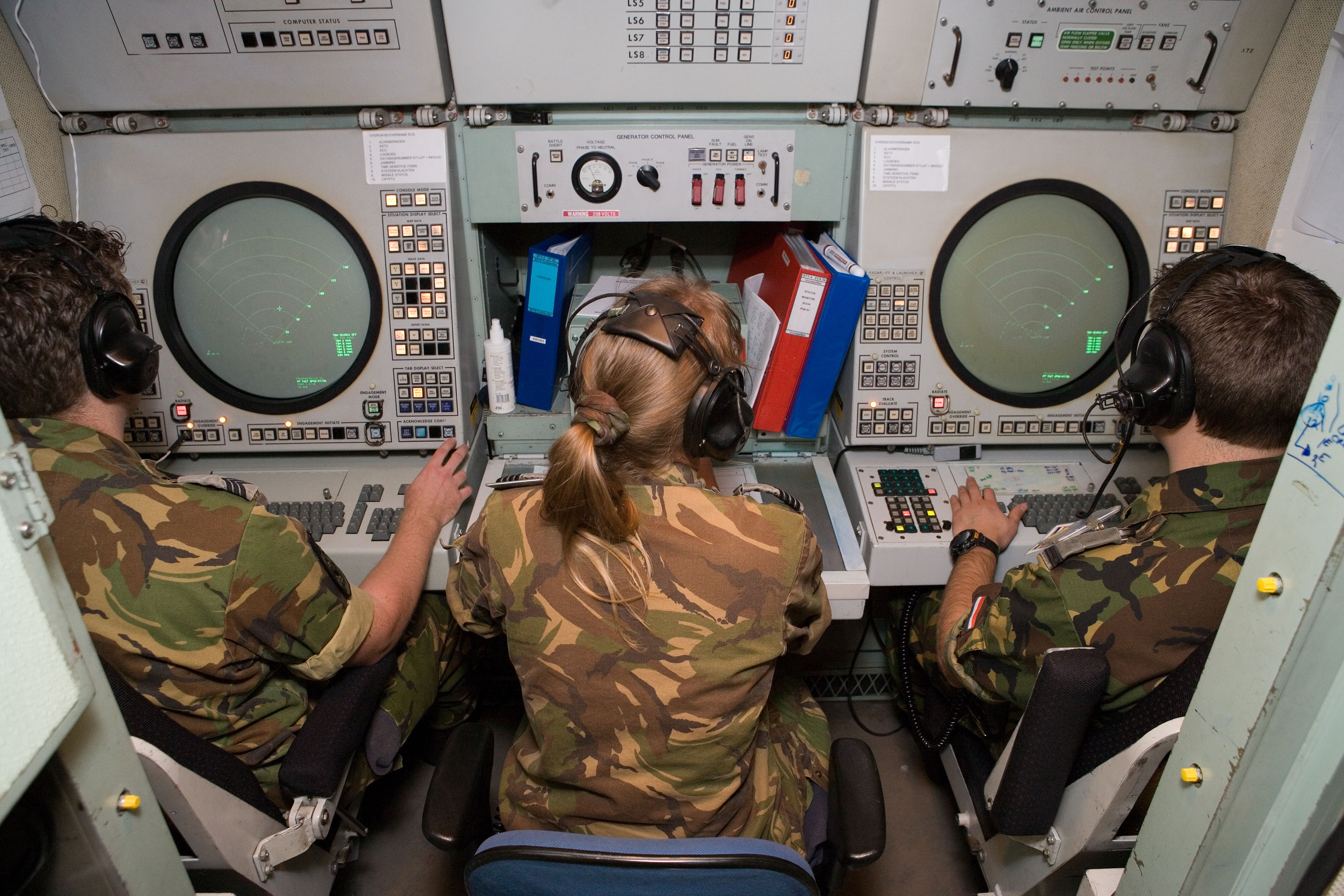
Operator stations (pre-PDB 7)

The AN/MSQ-104 or AN/MSQ-132 Engagement Control Station (ECS) is the nerve center of the Patriot firing battery, costing approximately US$6 million per unit. The ECS consists of a shelter mounted on the bed of an M927 5-Ton Cargo Truck or on the bed of a Light Medium Tactical Vehicle (LMTV) cargo truck. The main subcomponents of the ECS are the Weapons Control Computer (WCC), the Data Link Terminal (DLT), the UHF communications array, the Routing Logic Radio Interface Unit (RLRIU), and the two-person stations that serve as the system's human machine interface. The ECS is air conditioned, pressurized (to resist chemical/biological attack), and shielded against electromagnetic pulse (EMP) or other such electromagnetic interference. The ECS also contains several SINCGARS radios to facilitate voice communications.

The WCC is the main computer within the Patriot system. This computer controls the operator interface, calculates missile intercept algorithms, and provides limited fault diagnostics. It was designed as a 24-bit parallel militarized computer with fixed- and floating-point capability, organized in a multiprocessor configuration that operates at a maximum clock rate of 6 MHz. Compared to modern personal computers, this represents very limited processing power, so the computer has been upgraded several times during Patriot's service life. The latest variant fielded in 2013 has performance improved by several orders of magnitude.

The DLT connects the ECS to Patriot's Launching Stations. It uses either a SINCGARS radio or fiber optic cables to transmit encrypted data between the ECS and the launchers. Through the DLT, the system operators can remotely emplace, slew or stow launchers, perform diagnostics on launchers or missiles, and fire missiles.

The UHF communications array consists of three UHF radio "stacks" and their associated patching and encrypting equipment. These radios are connected to the antennas of the OE-349 Antenna Mast Group, which are used to create UHF "shots" between sister Patriot batteries and their associated ICC. This creates a secure, real-time data network (known as PADIL, Patriot Data Information Link) that allows the ICC to centralize control of its subordinate firing batteries.

The RLRIU functions as the primary router for all data coming into the ECS. The RLRIU gives a firing battery an address on the battalion data network, and sends/receives data from across the battalion. It also "translates" data coming from the WCC to the DLT, facilitating communication with the launchers.

Patriot's crew stations are referred to as Manstation 1 and 3 (MS1 and MS3). These are the stations where Patriot operators interface with the system. The manstations consist of a monochrome (green and black) screen surrounded by various Switch Indicators. Each manstation also has a traditional QWERTY keyboard and isometric stick, a tiny joystick that functions much like a PC mouse. It is through these switch indicators and the Patriot user interface software that the system is operated. With newer upgrades, the operator's monochrome screen and physical switches have been replaced with two 30 in (760 mm) touchscreen LCDs and a standard keyboard/mouse at both stations.

==== OE-349 Antenna Mast Group ====
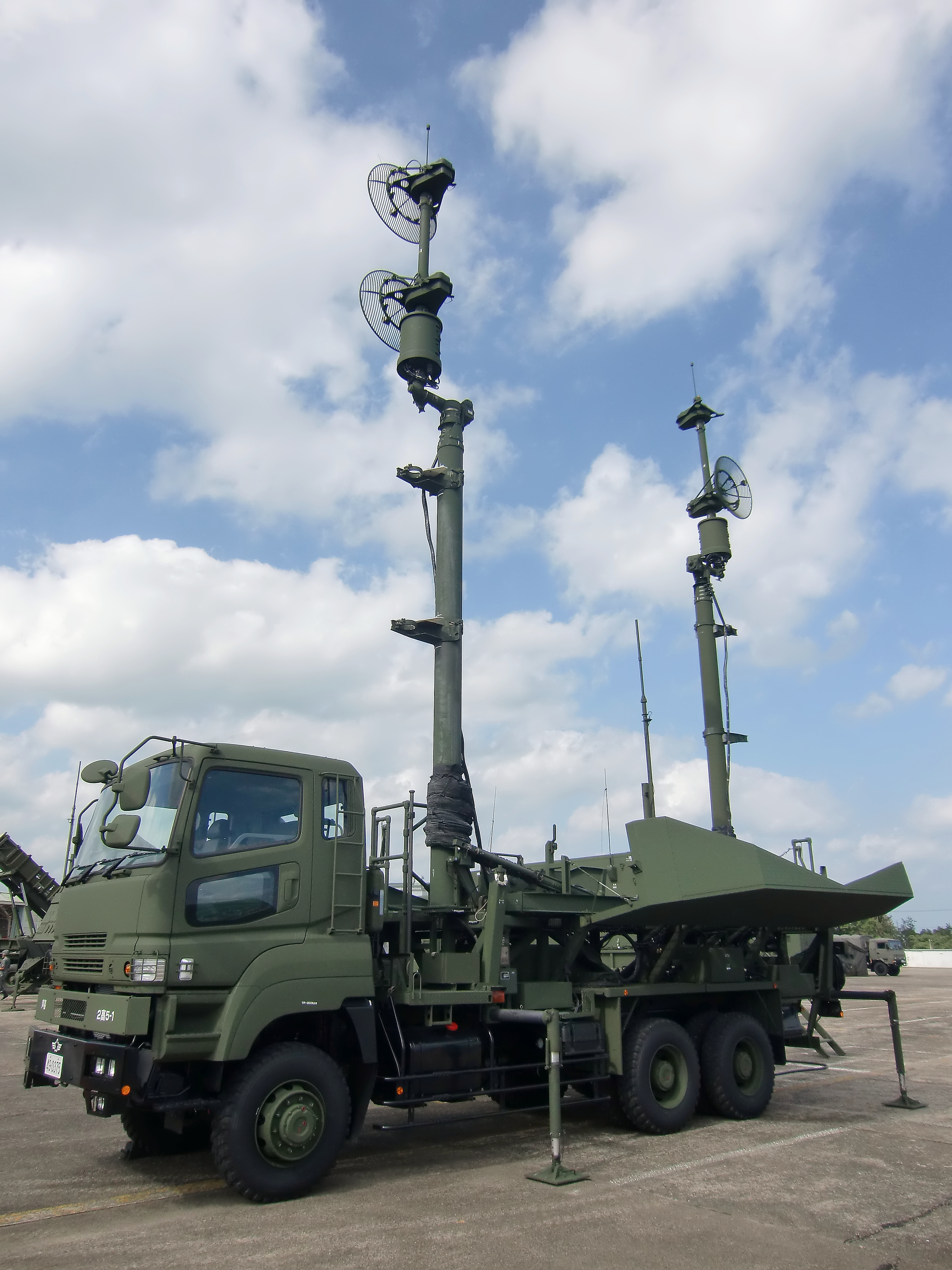
OE-349/MRC Antenna Mast Group

The OE-349 Antenna Mast Group (AMG) is mounted on an M927 5-Ton Cargo Truck. It includes four 4 kW antennas in two pairs on remotely controlled masts. Emplacement of the AMG can have no greater than a 0.5-degree roll and a 10-degree crossroll. The antennas can be controlled in azimuth, and the masts can be elevated up to 100 feet 11 inches (30.76 m) above ground level. Mounted at the base of each pair of antennas are two high-power amplifiers associated with the antennas and the radios in the co-located shelter.

It is through these antennas that the ECS and ICC send their respective UHF "shots" to create the PADIL network. The polarity of each shot can be changed by adjusting the "feedhorn" to a vertical or horizontal position. This enables a greater chance of communication shots reaching their intended target when terrain obstacles may otherwise obscure the signal.

==== EPP-III Electric Power Plant ====
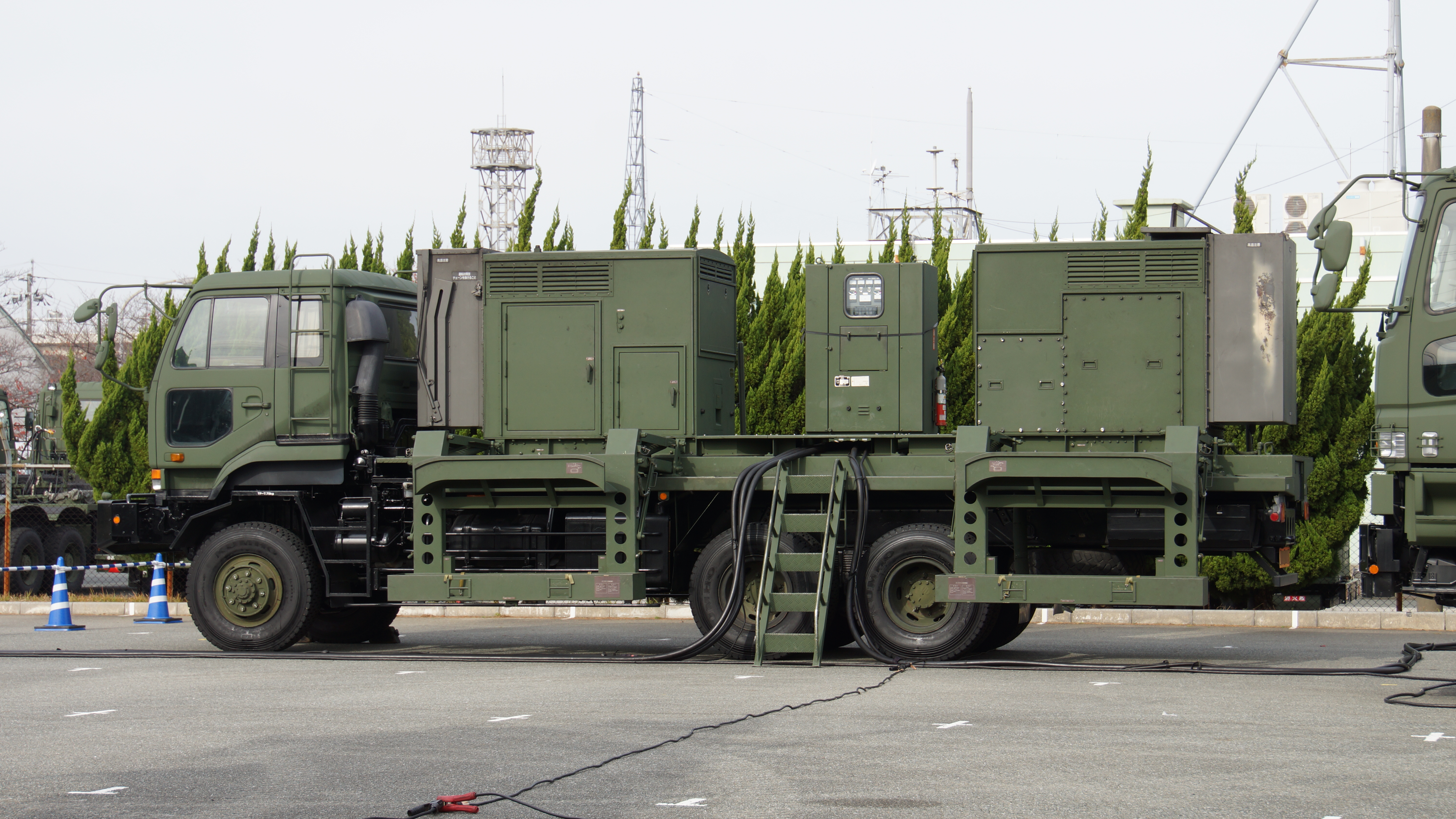
EPP-III Electric Power Plant vehicle of JSDF

The EPP-III Diesel-Electric Power Plant (EPP) is the power source for the ECS and Radar. The EPP consists of two 150 kilowatt diesel engines with 400 hertz, 3-phase generators that are interconnected through the power distribution unit. The generators are mounted on a trailer or modified M977 HEMTT.

Each EPP has two 100-US-gallon (380 L) fuel tanks and a fuel distribution assembly with grounding equipment. Each diesel engine can operate for more than eight hours with a full fuel tank. The EPP delivers its power to the Radar and ECS through cables stored in reels alongside the generators. It powers the AMG via a cable routed through the ECS.

==== M901/902/903 Launching Station ====
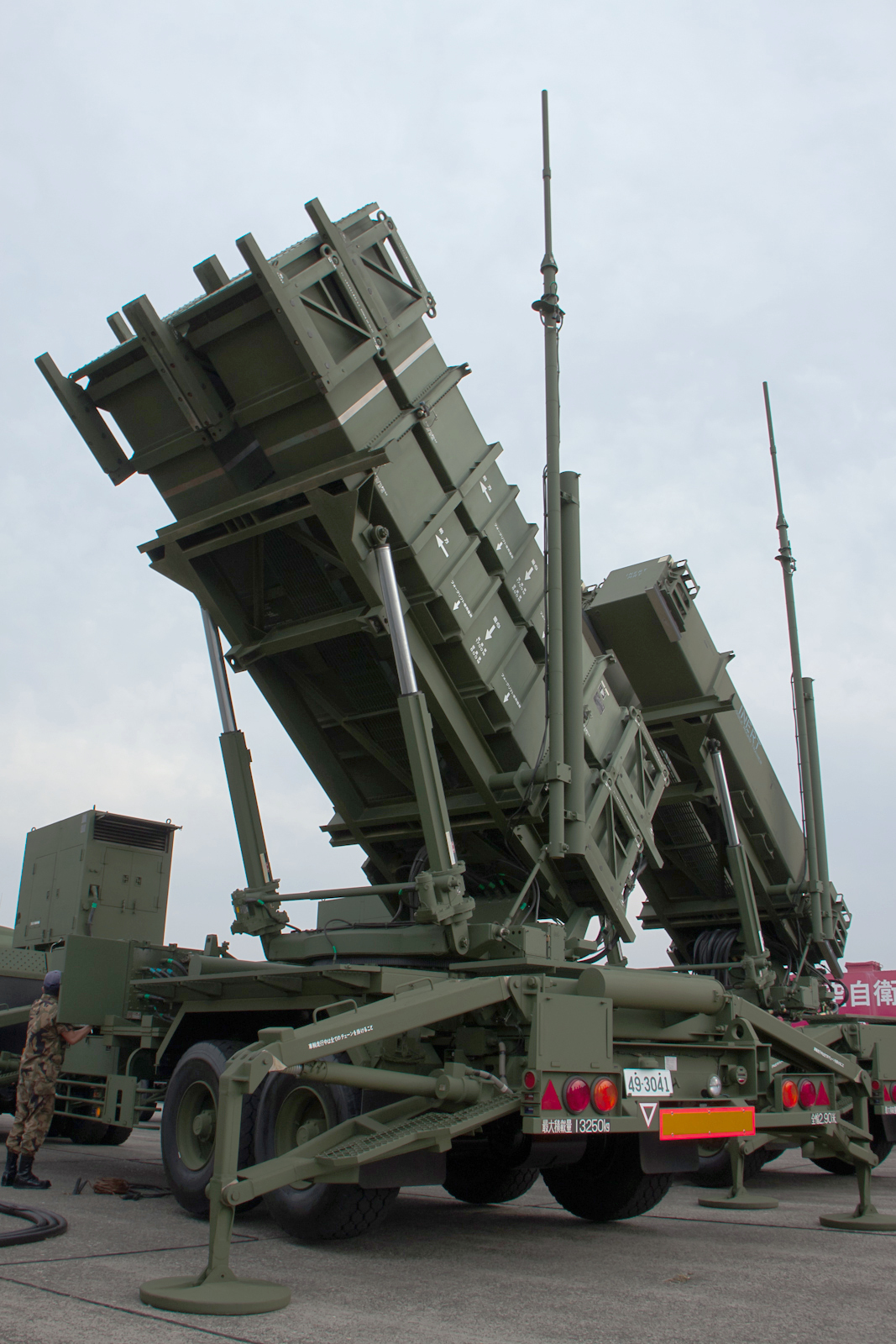
M901 (PAC-2) and M902 (PAC-3) Launching Stations

The M90x Launching Stations are remotely operated, self-contained units. The ECS controls operation of the launchers through each launcher's DLT, via fiber optic or VHF (SINCGARS) data link.

Integral levelling equipment permits emplacement on slopes of up to 10 degrees. Each launcher is trainable in azimuth and elevates to a fixed, elevated launch position. Precise aiming of the launcher before launch is not necessary; thus, no extra lags are introduced into system reaction time. Each launcher is capable of providing detailed diagnostics to the ECS via the data link.

The launching station contains four major equipment subsystems: the launcher generator set, the launcher electronics module (LEM), the launcher mechanics assembly (LMA), and the launcher interconnection group (LIG). The generator set consists of a 15 kW, 400 Hz generator that powers the launcher. The LEM is used for the real-time implementation of launcher operations requested via data link from the ECS. The LMA physically erects and rotates the launcher's platform and its missiles. The LIG connects the missiles themselves to the launcher via the Launcher Missile Round Distributor (LMRD).

==== Patriot guided missile ====
Patriot missile
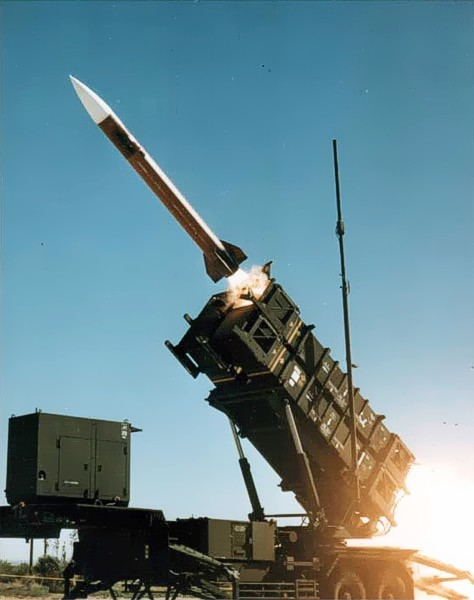
- Four Patriot PAC-2 or sixteen Patriot PAC-3 missiles can be fired from the highly mobile TEL
- Type: Surface-to-air missile
- Place of origin: United States

Production history
- Designer: Raytheon
- Unit cost: US$1 to 6 million
- No. built: over 10,000
- Variants: Standard, ASOJ/SOJC, PAC-2, PAC-2 GEM, GEM/C, GEM/T (or GEM+), PAC-3, PAC-3 MSE, PAAC-4 (SkyCeptor)

Specifications (See § Variants)
- Launch platform: Mobile trainable round semi-trailer

The first fielded variant was the MIM-104A "Standard". It was optimized solely for engagements against aircraft and had very limited capability against ballistic missiles. It had a range of 70 km (43 mi), and a speed in excess of Mach 2. The MIM-104B "anti-standoff jammer" (ASOJ) is a missile designed to seek out and destroy ECM emitters.

The MIM-104C PAC-2 missile was the first Patriot missile that was optimized for ballistic missile engagements. The GEM series of missiles (MIM-104D/E) are further refinements of the PAC-2 missile. The PAC-3 missile is a new interceptor, featuring a Ka band active radar seeker, employing "hit-to-kill" interception, in contrast to previous interceptors' method of exploding in the vicinity of the target, destroying it with shrapnel, and several other enhancements which dramatically increase its lethality against ballistic missiles. The specific information for these different kinds of missiles are discussed in the "Variants" section.

The first seven of these are in the larger PAC-2 configuration of a single missile per canister, of which four can be placed on a launcher. PAC-3 missile canisters contain four missiles, so that sixteen rounds can be placed on a launcher. The missile canister serves as both the shipping and storage container and the launch tube. Patriot missiles are referred to as "certified rounds" as they leave the factory, and additional maintenance is not necessary on the missile prior to it being launched.

The PAC-2 missile is 5.8 metres (19 ft 0 in) long, weighs about 900 kilograms (2,000 lb), and is propelled by a solid-fueled rocket motor.

==== Patriot missile design ====
The PAC-2 family of missiles all have a fairly standard design, the only differences between the variants being certain internal components. They consist of (from front to rear) the radome, guidance section, warhead section, propulsion section, and control actuator section.

The radome is made of slip cast fused silica approximately 16.5 millimetres (0.65 in) thick, with a nickel alloy tip, and a composite base attachment ring bonded to the slip cast fused silica and protected by a molded silicone rubber ring. The radome provides an aerodynamic shape for the missile and microwave window and thermal protection for the RF seeker and electronic components.

The Patriot guidance section consists primarily of the modular digital airborne guidance system (MDAGS). The MDAGS consists of a modular midcourse package that performs all of the required guidance functions from launch through midcourse and a terminal guidance section. The TVM seeker is mounted on the guidance section, extending into the radome. The seeker consists of an antenna mounted on an inertial platform, antenna control electronics, a receiver, and a transmitter.

The Modular Midcourse Package (MMP), which is located in the forward portion of the warhead section, consists of the navigational electronics and a missile-borne computer that computes the guidance and autopilot algorithms and provides steering commands according to a resident computer program.

The warhead section, just aft of the guidance section, contains the proximity fuzed warhead, safety-and-arming device, fuzing circuits and antennas, link antenna switching circuits, auxiliary electronics, inertial sensor assembly, and signal data converter.

The propulsion section consists of the rocket motor, external heat shield, and two external conduits. The rocket motor includes the case, nozzle assembly, propellant, liner and insulation, pyrogen igniter, and propulsion arming and firing unit. The casing of the motor is an integral structural element of the missile airframe. It contains a conventional, casebonded solid rocket propellant.

The Control Actuator Section (CAS) is at the aft end of the missile. It receives commands from the missile autopilot and positions the fins. The missile fins steer and stabilize the missile in flight. A fin servo system positions the fins. The fin servo system consists of hydraulic actuators and valves and an electrohydraulic power supply. The electrohydraulic power consists of a battery, motor pump, oil reservoir, gas pressure bottle, and accumulator.

== Variants ==
Missile specifications
	MIM-104A	MIM-104D/E PAC-2	MIM-104F PAC-3	MIM-104F PAC-3 MSE	SkyCeptor
Mass	907.2 kg (2,000 lb)	900 kg (2,000 lb) (est.)	315 kg (694 lb)	Unknown	Unknown
Length	5.3 m (17 ft 5 in)	5.3 m (17 ft 5 in) (est.)	5.2 m (17 ft 1 in)	5.3 m (17 ft 5 in) (est.)	3.38 m (11 ft 1 in) without booster (est.); 4.95 m (16 ft 3 in) with booster (est.)
Diameter	410 mm (16 in)	410 mm (16 in) (est.)	255 mm (10 in)	290 mm (11 in) (est.)	230 mm (9.1 in) missile (est.); 305 mm (12 in) booster (est.)
Wingspan	870 mm (34 in)	863 mm (34 in) (est.)	Unknown	Unknown	460 mm (18 in) missile (est.); 490 mm (19 in) booster (est.)
Guidance type	Track-via-missile		Active radar homing		Dual mode (IR homing and active radar homing)
Guidance seeker	Semi-active radar		Active radar seeker		IR seeker; active radar seeker
Warhead	Fragmentation Warhead		Hit-to-kill		
Warhead weight	91 kg (201 lb)	84 kg (185 lb)	8.2 kg (18 lb)	Unknown	Unknown
Detonation mechanism	RF proximity		Impact		N/A
Motor	Solid propellant, single-stage rocket motor				Two-stage, dual-pulse rocket motors (est.)
Max altitude	18,300 m (60,000 ft) (est.)	32,000 m (105,000 ft) (est.)	Aerial target: 24,000 m (79,000 ft) (est); Ballistic missile target: 20,000 m (66,000 ft) (est.)	36,000 m (118,000 ft)	50,000 m (160,000 ft) (est.)
Max speed	1,190 m/s (3,900 ft/s; Mach 3.5)	1,190 m/s (3,900 ft/s; Mach 3.5)	Unknown	Unknown	1,887 m/s (6,190 ft/s; Mach 5.5) (est.)
Max range	105 km (57 nmi; 65 mi) (est.)	160 km (86 nmi; 99 mi) (est.)	Aerial target: 80 km (43 nmi; 50 mi) (est.); Ballistic missile target: 40 km (22 nmi; 25 mi) (est.)	Aerial target: 120 km (65 nmi; 75 mi) (est.); Ballistic missile target: 60 km (32 nmi; 37 mi) (est.)	Aerial target: 180 km (97 nmi; 110 mi) (est.); Ballistic missile target: 75 km (40 nmi; 47 mi) (est.)

=== MIM-104A ===
Patriot was first introduced with a single missile type: the MIM-104A. This was the initial "Standard" missile, still known as "Standard" today. In Patriot's early days, the system was used exclusively as an anti-aircraft weapon, with no capability against ballistic missiles. This was remedied during the late 1980s when Patriot received its first major system overhaul with the introduction of the Patriot Advanced Capability missile and concurrent system upgrades.

=== MIM-104B (PAC-1) ===
Patriot Advanced Capability (PAC-1), known today as the PAC-1 upgrade, was a software-only upgrade. The most significant aspects of this upgrade were changing the way the radar searched and the way the system defended its assets. Instead of searching low to the horizon, the top of the radar's search angle was lifted to near vertical (89 degrees) from the previous angle of 25 degrees. This was done as a counter to the steep parabolic trajectory of inbound ballistic missiles. The search beams of the radar were tightened, and while in "TBM search mode" the "flash", or the speed at which these beams were shot out, was increased significantly.

While this increased the radar's detection capability against the ballistic missile threat set, it decreased the system's effectiveness against traditional atmospheric targets, as it reduced the detection range of the radar as well as the number of "flashes" at the horizon. Because of this, it was necessary to retain the search functions for traditional atmospheric threats in a separate search program, which could be easily toggled by the operator based on the expected threat.

The ballistic missile defense capability changed the way Patriot defended targets. Instead of being used as a system to defend a significant area against enemy air attack, it was now used to defend much smaller "point" targets, which needed to lie within the system's TBM "footprint". The footprint is the area on the ground that Patriot can defend against inbound ballistic missiles.

In the 1980s, Patriot was upgraded in relatively minor ways, mostly via its software. The most significant of these was a special upgrade to discriminate and intercept artillery rockets in the vein of the multiple rocket launcher, which was seen as a significant threat from North Korea. This feature has not been used in combat and has since been deleted from U.S. Army Patriot systems, though it remains in South Korean systems. Another upgrade was the introduction of another missile type, designated MIM-104B and called "anti stand-off jammer" (ASOJ) by the Army. This variant is designed to help Patriot engage and destroy ECM aircraft at standoff ranges. It works similar to an anti-radiation missile in that it flies a highly lofted trajectory and then locates, homes in on, and destroys the most significant emitter in an area designated by the operator.

=== MIM-104C (PAC-2) ===
In the late 1980s, tests began to indicate that, although Patriot was certainly capable of intercepting inbound ballistic missiles, it was questionable whether the MIM-104A/B missile was capable of destroying them reliably. This necessitated the introduction of the PAC-2 missile and system upgrade.

For the system, the PAC-2 upgrade was similar to the PAC-1 upgrade. Radar search algorithms were further optimized, and the beam protocol while in "TBM search" was further modified. PAC-2 saw Patriot's first major missile upgrade, with the introduction of the MIM-104C, or PAC-2 missile. This missile was optimized for ballistic missile engagements. Major changes to the PAC-2 missile were the size of the projectiles in its blast-fragmentation warhead, changed from around 2 grams to around 45 grams, and the timing of the pulse-Doppler radar fuze, which was optimized for high-speed engagements, though it retained its old algorithm for aircraft engagements if necessary.

Engagement procedures were optimized, changing the method of fire the system used to engage ballistic missiles. Instead of launching two missiles in an almost simultaneous salvo, a brief delay between 3 and 4 seconds was added, in order to allow the second missile launched to discriminate a ballistic missile warhead in the aftermath of the explosion of the first.

PAC-2 was first tested in 1987 and reached Army units in 1990, just in time for deployment to the Middle East for the Persian Gulf War. It was there that Patriot was first regarded as a successful ABM system and proof that ballistic missile defense was indeed possible. The complete study on its effectiveness remains classified.

In April 2013, Raytheon received U.S. Army approval for a second recertification, extending the operational life of the worldwide inventory of Patriot missiles from 30 to 45 years.

=== MIM-104D (PAC-2/GEM) ===
There were more upgrades to PAC-2 systems throughout the 1990s and into the 21st century, mostly centering on software. The PAC-2 missiles were modified significantly—four separate variants became known collectively as guidance enhanced missiles (GEM).

The main upgrade to the original GEM missile was a new, faster proximity fuzed warhead. Tests had indicated that the fuze on the original PAC-2 missiles were detonating their warheads too late when engaging ballistic missiles with an extremely steep ingress, and as such it was necessary to shorten this fuze delay. The GEM missile was given a new "low noise" seeker head designed to reduce interference in front of the missile's radar seeker, and a higher performance seeker designed to better detect low radar cross-section targets. The GEM was used extensively in Operation Iraqi Freedom (OIF), during which air defense was highly successful.

=== MIM-104E (PAC-2/GEM+) ===
Just prior to OIF, it was decided to further upgrade the GEM and PAC-2 missiles. This upgrade program produced missiles known as the GEM-T and the GEM-C, the "T" designator referring to tactical ballistic missiles, and the "C" designator referring to cruise missiles. These missiles were both given a totally new nose section, which was designed specifically to be more effective against low altitude, low RCS targets like cruise missiles. The GEM-T was given a new fuze which was further optimized against ballistic missiles and a new low noise oscillator which increases the seeker's sensitivity to low radar cross-section targets. The GEM-C is the upgraded version of the GEM, and the GEM-T is the upgraded version of the PAC-2. The GEM+ entered service in November 2002.

In 2018, Raytheon upgraded the GEM-T guidance system with solid-state gallium nitride (GaN) transmitters. Domestic U.S. production of PAC-2 GEM-T missiles remains ongoing, with a contracted backlog of approximately 1,500 missiles and a near-term demand of an additional 1,000 missiles, while the company is producing roughly 20 missiles a month with plans to expand to 35 missiles a month by the end of 2027.

As of April 2024 a consortium of Patriot operators consisting of Germany, Romania, Spain, and the Netherlands had placed an order for 1,000 PAC-2 GEM-T missiles, with the bulk of production to take place in Germany in a purpose-built MBDA plant. On November 18, 2024 Boris Pistorius participated in a ground-breaking ceremony at the plant site in Schrobenhausen. "The new facility will cover an area of approximately 6,000 square meters and create more than 300 new jobs. Construction is scheduled for completion in September 2026." General Christian Freuding maintained in July 2025 that the output of the plant would be "under European control".

=== MIM-104F (PAC-3 CRI) ===
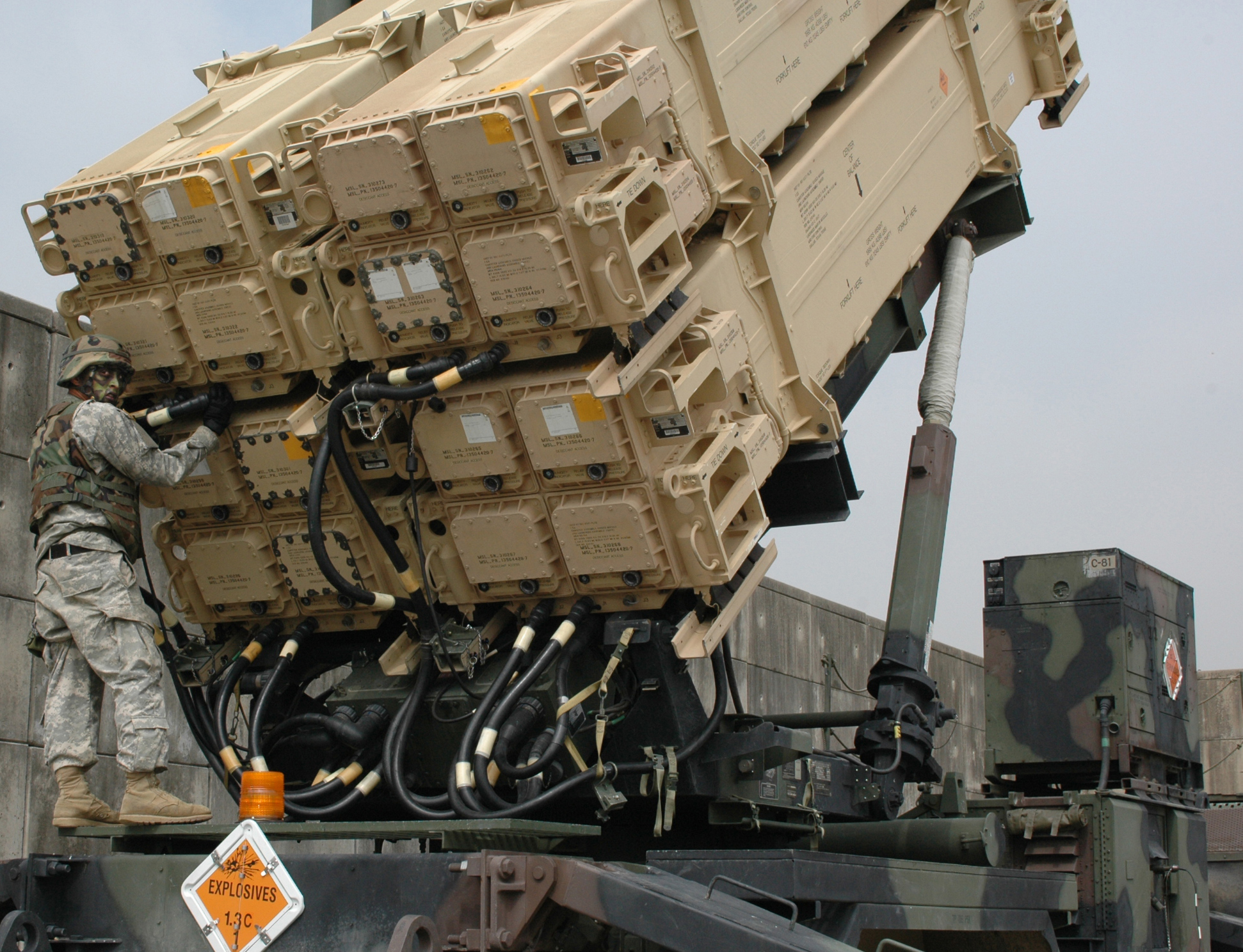
A PAC-3 missile launcher, note the four missiles in each canister

The PAC-3 upgrade is a significant upgrade to nearly every aspect of the system. It took place in three stages deployed in 1995, 1996 and 2000, and units were designated Configuration 1, 2, or 3.

New software update known as PDB 5 (PDB standing for "post deployment build") was released in 1999 with initial support for Configuration-3 ground units and PAC-3 missiles. The system itself saw another upgrade of its WCC, and the communication setup was given a complete overhaul. Due to this upgrade, PAC-3 operators can now see, transmit, and receive tracks on the Link 16 Command and Control (C2) network using a Class 2M Terminal or MIDS LVT Radio. This capability greatly increases the situational awareness of Patriot crews and other participants on the Link 16 network that are able to receive the Patriot local air picture.

The software can now conduct a tailored TBM search, optimizing radar resources for search in a particular sector known to have ballistic missile activity, and can support a "keepout altitude" to ensure ballistic missiles with chemical warheads or early release submunitions (ERS) are destroyed at a certain altitude. For Configuration 3 units, the Patriot radar was completely redesigned, adding another traveling wave tube (TWT) that increased the radar's search, detection, tracking, and discrimination abilities. The new radar is designated AN/MPQ-65. It is capable, among other things, of discriminating whether an aircraft is crewed and which of multiple reentering ballistic objects are carrying ordnance.

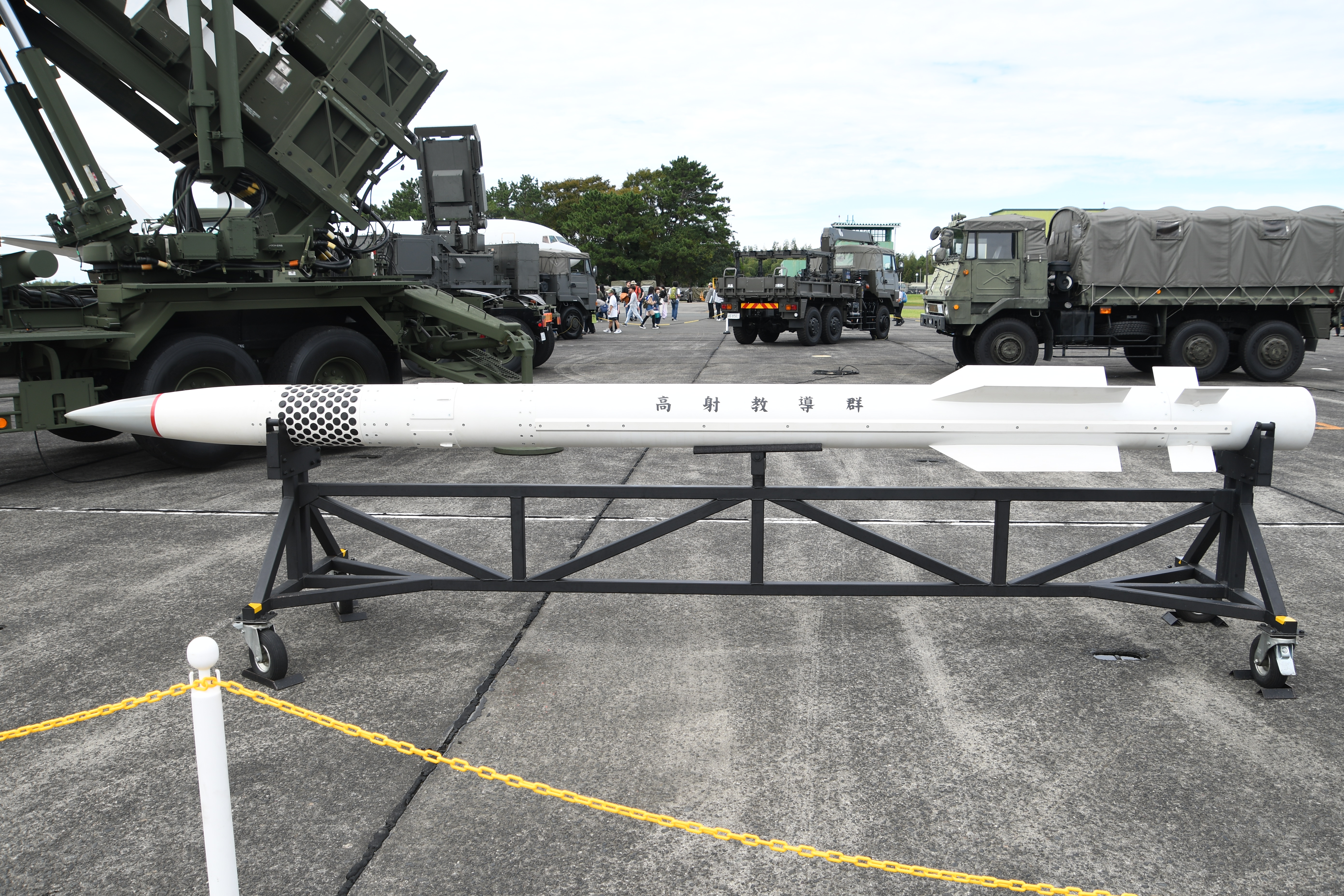
PAC-3 dummy missile on display at the Hamamatsu Air Base

The PAC-3 upgrade carried with it a new missile design, nominally known as MIM-104F and called PAC-3 by the Army. First deployed in 1997, the PAC-3 missile evolved from the Strategic Defense Initiative's ERINT missile, and so it is dedicated almost entirely to the anti-ballistic missile mission. Due to miniaturization, a single canister can hold four PAC-3 missiles, as opposed to one PAC-2 missile per canister. The PAC-3 missile is more maneuverable than previous variants, due to 180 tiny pulse solid propellant rocket motors mounted in the forebody of the missile, called Attitude Control Motors, or ACMs, which serve to fine align the missile trajectory with its target to achieve hit-to-kill capability.

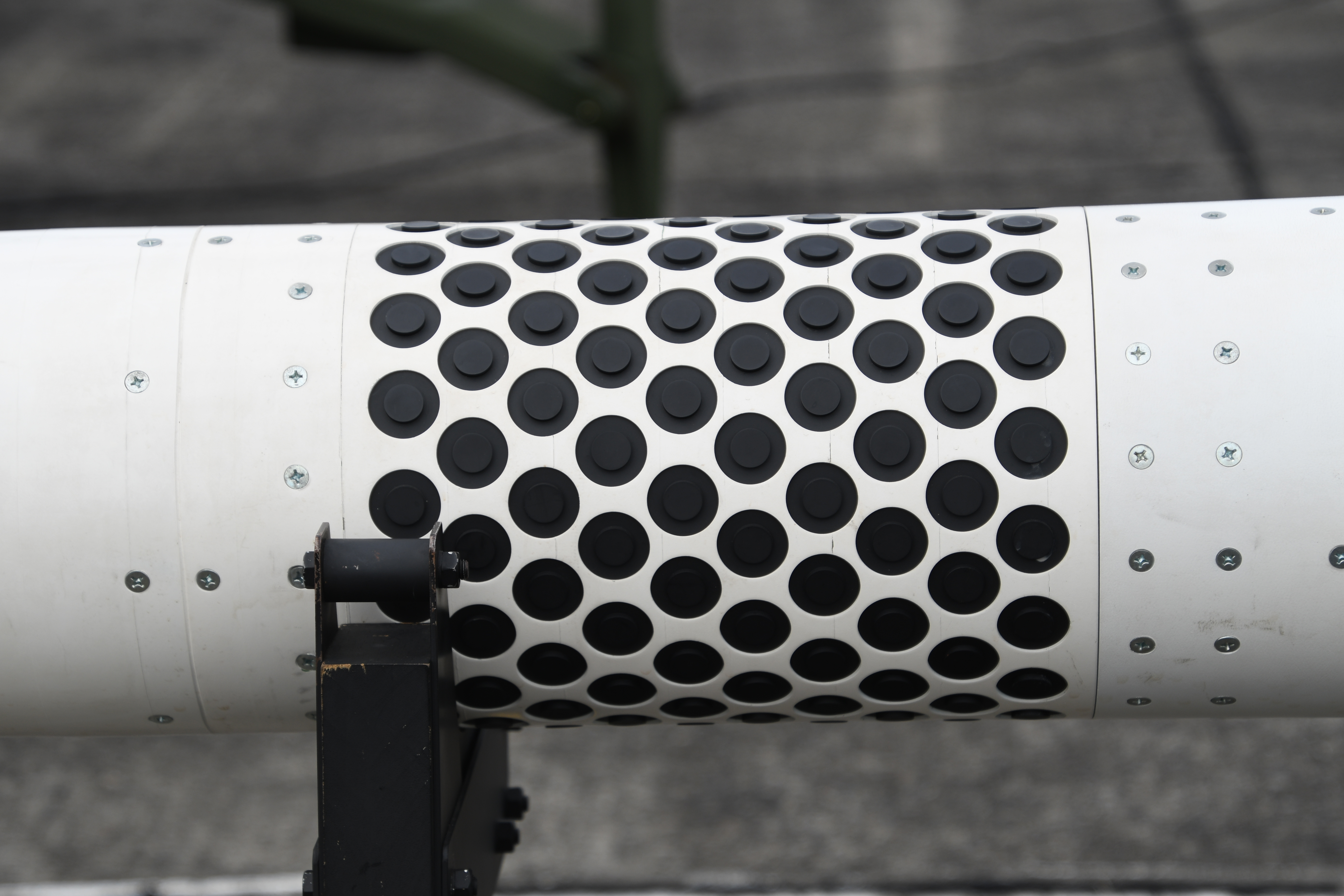
Attitude control motors

The most significant upgrade to the PAC-3 missile is the addition of a K_{a} band active radar seeker. This allows the missile to drop its uplink to the system and acquire its target itself in the terminal phase of its intercept, which improves the reaction time of the missile against a fast-moving ballistic missile target. The PAC-3 missile is accurate enough to select, target, and home in on the warhead portion of an inbound ballistic missile. The active radar gives the warhead a "hit-to-kill" (kinetic kill vehicle) capability that eliminates the need for a traditional proximity-fused warhead. The missile still has a small explosive warhead, called a lethality enhancer, a warhead which launches 24 low-speed tungsten fragments in a radial direction to make the missile cross-section greater and enhance the kill probability. This greatly increases the lethality against ballistic missiles of all types.

The PAC-3 upgrade has effectively quintupled the "footprint" that a Patriot unit can defend against ballistic missiles of all types, and has considerably increased the system's lethality and effectiveness against ballistic missiles. It has increased the scope of ballistic missiles that Patriot can engage, which now includes several intermediate ranges. However, despite its increases in ballistic missile defense capabilities, the PAC-3 missile has a shorter range and a smaller explosive warhead compared to older Patriot missiles, making it a less capable interceptor of atmospheric aircraft and air-to-surface missiles. During initial production run, range was increased and other cost-reducing enhancements were incorporated to the PAC-3 missile, with the final variant renamed PAC-3 Cost Reduction Initiative (CRI).

Since the PAC-3 ground units can control both M901 PAC-2 launchers and M902/M903 PAC-2/PAC-3 launchers, Patriot batteries employ a mix of PAC-3 hit-to-kill active missiles and PAC-2 GEM-T blast fragmentation warhead semi-active missiles to counter both ballistic missile and aircraft threats. While the PAC-2 is able to intercept targets up to an altitude of 20 km (66,000 ft), the PAC-3 can destroy incoming missiles at an altitude of 40 km (130,000 ft).

Lockheed Martin proposed an air-launched variant of the PAC-3 missile for use on the F-15C Eagle, the F-22 Raptor and the P-8A Poseidon.

According to Lockheed Martin, PAC-3 CRI can be quad-packed into a VLS cell; though the Navy is considering the single-packed PAC-3 MSE version as its replacement for the SM-2 missile system, PAC-3 CRI is considered a potential follow-on project offering greater magazine depth as a tradeoff for decreased performance compared to PAC-3 MSE.

=== PAC-3 MSE ===
Lockheed Martin Missiles and Fire Control is the prime contractor on the PAC-3 Missile Segment Enhancement upgrade (MSE) to the Patriot air defense system which will make the missile more agile and extend its range by up to 50%.

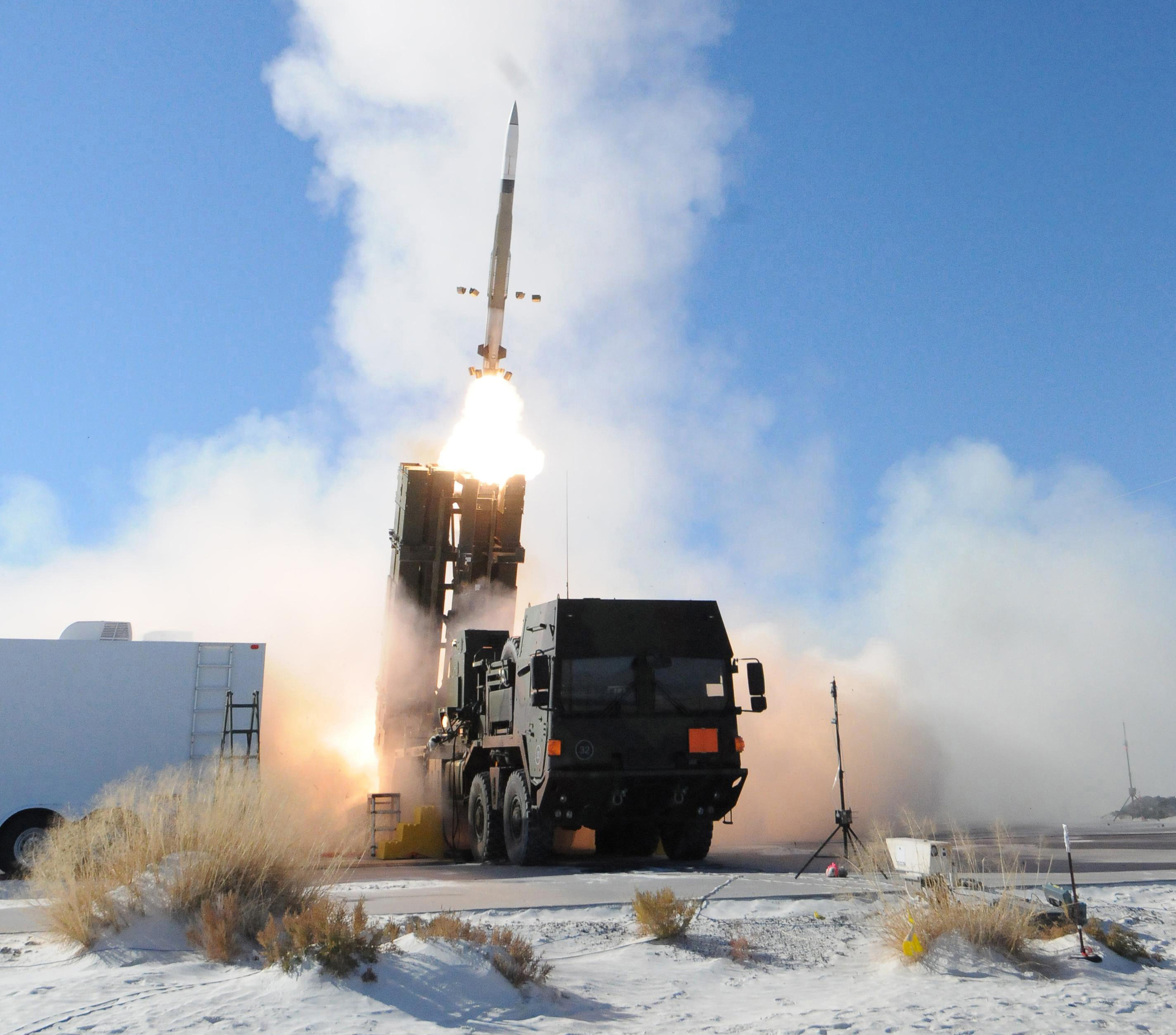
A Patriot PAC-3 MSE missile starts from a MEADS launcher

Patriot's PAC-3 MSE interceptor was selected as the primary interceptor for the new MEADS system when its design and development program began in 2004. MEADS is designed with plug-and-fight capabilities to support data exchange with external sensors and launchers through standardized open protocols for integrated air and missile defense (IAMD), so that MEADS elements can interoperate with allied forces on the move, attaching to and detaching from the battle management network as necessary. MEADS was scheduled to enter service alongside Patriot by 2014, with expectations that existing Patriot batteries will be gradually upgraded with MEADS technology in the long run. Because of economic conditions, in 2013 the U.S. chose to upgrade its Patriot systems instead of buying the MEADS system.

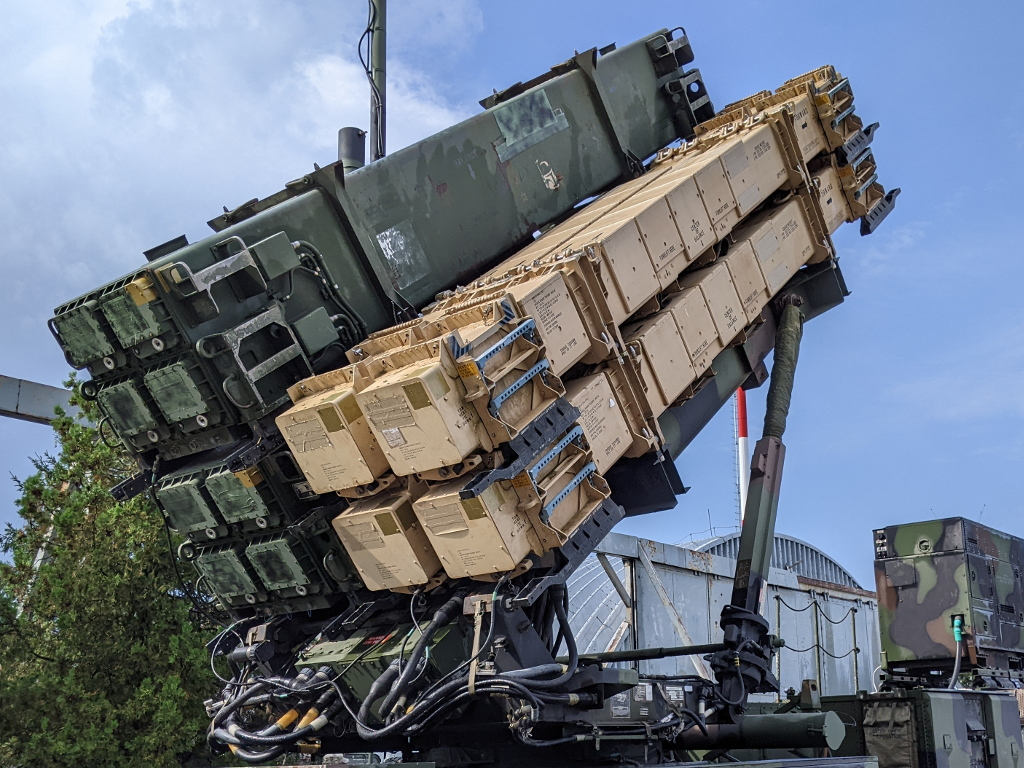
M903 LS with two PAC-3 (green) and four PAC-3 MSE missile containers

The PAC-3 Missile Segment upgrade consists of the PAC-3 MSE missile, a very agile hit-to-kill interceptor, the M903 Launching Station, a fire solution computer, and an Enhanced Launcher Electronics System (ELES). The PAC-3 Missile Segment Enhancement (MSE) interceptor increases altitude and range through a more powerful dual-pulse motor for added thrust, larger fins that collapse inside current launchers, and other structural modifications for more agility. The PAC-3 MSE is capable of intercepting longer-range theater ballistic missiles. The U.S. Army accepted the first PAC-3 MSE interceptors in October 2015, and Initial Operational Capability (IOC) was declared in August 2016.

The new M903 Launching System has a modular design capable of holding a total of 4 PAC-3 launching canisters (16 missiles), 12 PAC-3 MSE canisters (in 3 rows of 4), or 4 PAC-2 GEM canisters. It can mix different missiles, such as 6 PAC-3 MSE canisters (in 3 rows of 2) and either two PAC-3 canisters (8 missiles) or two PAC-2 canisters on the same launcher, down to combinations of a single PAC-2 canister, a single PAC-3 canister (4 missiles), 4 PAC-3 MSE canisters (in 2 rows of 2) or 2 PAC-3 MSE canisters in a single row. In December 2023 it was stated that production of Patriot interceptors was 550 a year and would be increased to 650 a year in 2024.

In February 2023, Lockheed Martin showcased integration of PAC-3 MSE missile with Mk 41 VLS used by Aegis BMD and Aegis Ashore. Lockheed announced it is spending $100 million to integrate the missile with the Aegis combat system and plans to test whether it can fire the missiles from a vertical launch system tied into Aegis's command-and-control technology and the SPY-1 radar in early 2024. In 2024, it was integrated with Aegis and launched from a Mark 70 Payload Delivery System VLS launcher at White Sands Missile Range. The PAC-3 MSE interceptor is viewed as a potential long-term replacement for the SM-2 interceptor due to its "high agility" and proven capabilities for "counter-hypersonic, ballistic missile, and cruise missile defense in various tight envelopes". According to Chris Mang, of Lockheed Martin's Missiles and Fire Control division, "the missile's capabilities are only enhanced when it's put in a maritime context and paired with the Aegis system, which has a lot more power than the Army's radar systems." The PAC-3 MSE would fill the gap in engagement envelope at low altitudes and shorter ranges against maneuvering threats, where the SM-6 missile (which must first be boosted to high altitudes before diving down on it target) cannot easily engage; According to Mang, the PAC-3 MSE's miniaturized attitude control motors allow it to engage these targets at ranges under a kilometer. Though PAC-3 MSE is the primary contender for this replacement, PAC-3 CRI missiles are also capable of being fired from the same platforms and are considered a follow-on option if the US Navy shows interest; compared to PAC-3 MSE they provide greater magazine depth (due to quad-pack capability in a VLS cell vs. the MSE's single missile per cell) but are less performant.

=== PAC-3 ACE ===
In July 2026, Lockheed Martin announced the lower-cost PAC-3 Adapted Capability Effector (ACE) missile, with initial production planned for 2028. It will be compatible with PAC-3 MSE launchers but should cost under half the cost of MSE missiles, roughly $2 million per missile. Reports suggest that, compared to the MSE, it will use a single-pulse solid motor, omit divert and attitude control thrusters and use a conventional explosive warhead rather than a hit-to-kill approach. It will have a shorter range and lower engagement altitude than the MSE and be intended for aircraft, cruise missile and short-range ballistic missile targets.

=== SkyCeptor (PAAC-4) ===
In August 2013, Raytheon and Rafael Advanced Defense Systems announced plans for Patriot Advanced Affordable Capability-4 (PAAC-4), which would integrate the Stunner interceptor from the jointly-funded David's Sling program with Patriot PAC-3 radars, launchers, and engagement control stations. The two-stage, multimode seeking Stunner would replace single-stage, radar-guided PAC-3 missiles produced by Lockheed Martin, providing improved operational performance at 20 percent of the $2 million unit cost of PAC-3 missiles. Israeli program officials have said that a previous teaming agreement between Raytheon and Rafael would allow the U.S. company to assume prime contractor status, and produce at least 60 percent of the Stunner missile in the United States.

In 2016 Raytheon announced that it had been authorized to bid SkyCeptor, a Stunner derivative, as part of its Polish Patriot bid. In March 2017 it was announced that Poland will acquire 8 Patriot batteries, with the majority of missiles deployed being SkyCeptors and only a small number of Patriot PAC-3 MSE missiles. Ultimately, Poland did not procure SkyCeptor missiles, ordering a new short-range air defence system based on CAMM and CAMM-ER missiles, integrated with Patriot batteries through the IBCS battle command system.

Electromecanica Ploiești, Romania, will start local production of SkyCeptor missile interceptors by 2026.

=== Upgrades ===
PAC-3 system upgrades continue under the International Engineering Services Program (IESP) which includes all countries that rely on the Patriot for integrated air and missile defense – as of 2022, the United States of America, The Netherlands, Germany, Japan, Israel, Saudi Arabia, Kuwait, Taiwan, Greece, Spain, South Korea, United Arab Emirates, Qatar, Romania, Sweden, Poland, Bahrain, and Switzerland.

The PDB 6 software update was released in 2004. This update allowed Configuration-3 to discriminate targets of all types, including anti-radiation missile carriers, helicopters, unmanned aerial vehicles, and cruise missiles.

The PDB 7 system upgrade was released in 2013. It improves radar search capabilities with a transition to digital signal processing, resulting in much better reliability and 30% longer range comparing to analog circuits. Processing power of the new command and control computer is higher by several orders of magnitude. Operator's monochrome CRT displays with hard-wired buttons were replaced by two 30-inch (760 mm) color touchscreen LCD monitors.

The PAC-3 Missile Segment Enhancement (MSE) upgrade was fielded in 2015. It includes a new fin design and a more powerful rocket engine.

In 2017, the AN/MPQ-65 radar was upgraded with active electronically scanned array (AESA) solid-state gallium nitride (GaN) transmitters in place of conventional traveling-wave tubes with a passive array of transmitters. The new radar has been redesignated AN/MPQ-65A. It includes a bolt-on replacement antenna array and two smaller rear panel arrays which provide 360-degree coverage.

During 2018–2023, Raytheon Company will further enhance the system under a modernization task order from the U.S. Army, resulting in Configuration-3+. The order includes five annual, indefinite delivery/indefinite quantity task order awards with a total contract ceiling of more than $2.3 billion, funded by Patriot partner states. The initial $235 million award was allocated in January 2018.

The PDB 8 upgrade released in 2018 includes redesigned fire control computers which support MSE capabilities, new weapons control computers with increased processing power, and software enhancements to radar search and target detection and identification which help reduce friendly fire incidents. The latest PDB 8.1 software started testing in 2019 and will reach operational status by 2023. It adds a revamped game-style GUI named Warfighter to Machine Interface (WMI) which employs 3D graphics to render the terrain and the airspace.

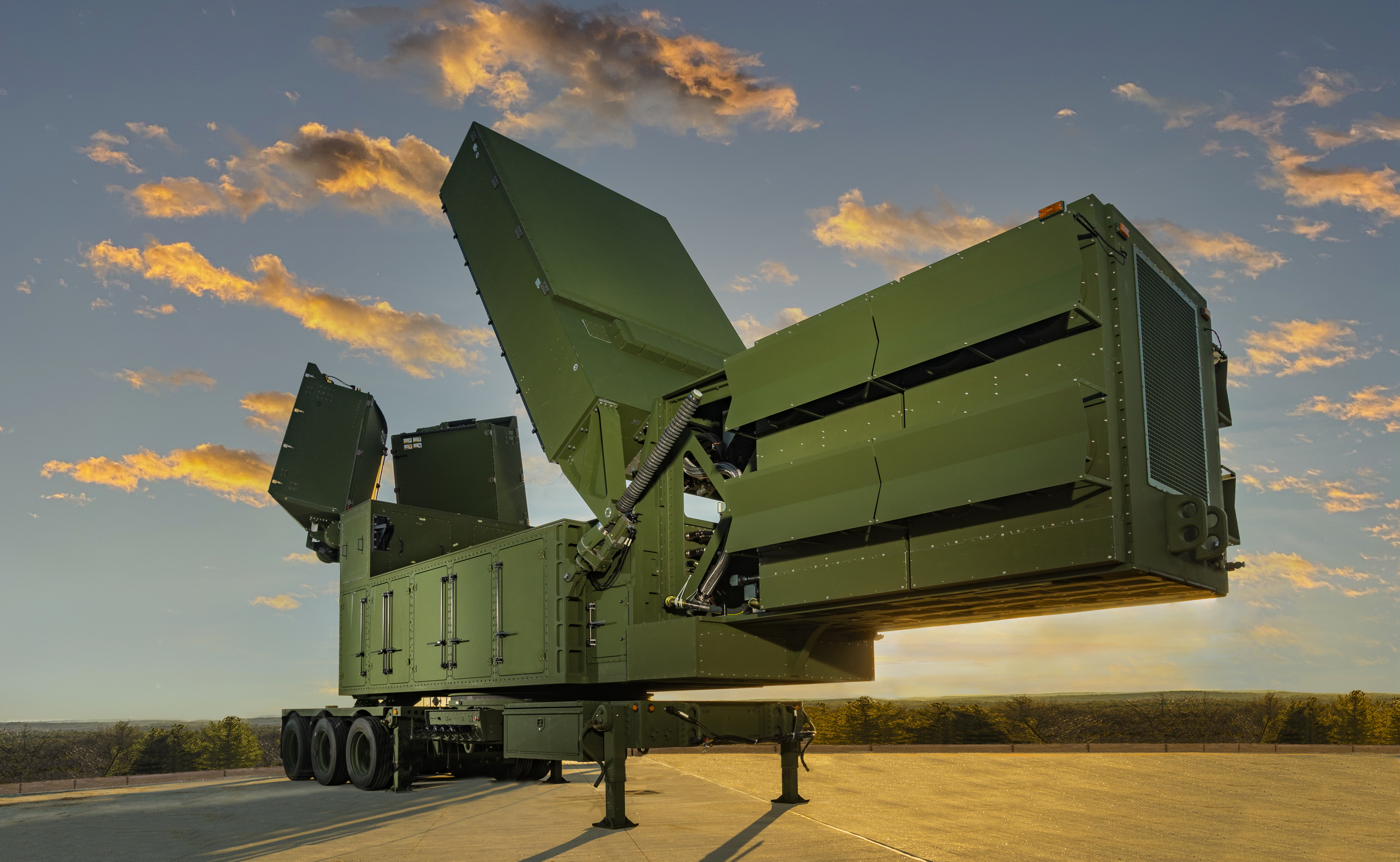
Lower Tier Air and Missile Defense Sensor

Future upgrades to the Patriot system will include the new Lower Tier Air and Missile Defense Sensor or LTAMDS with support for a Integrated Air and Missile Defense Battle Command System (IBCS) - which will integrate Patriot's LTAMDS, AN/MPQ-53 and AN/MPQ-65/65A radars with AN/MPQ-64 Sentinel and AN/TPS-80 G/ATOR, GhostEye MR (NASAMS), MFCR and SR from MEADS, AN/SPY-1 and AN/SPY-6 (Aegis BMD), AN/TPY-2 (THAAD and GMD) and AN/APG-81 (F-35 Lightning II) radars - and Mode 5 transponder interrogation in the identification friend or foe system.

In February 2025, Raytheon's LTAMDS radar successfully completed a live-fire test, detecting and tracking a high-speed cruise missile and guiding a PAC-2 GEM-T interceptor to neutralize the threat. As part of an ongoing U.S. Army test program, LTAMDS continues advancing toward full deployment, with strong international interest and a $2 billion contract to supply radars to the U.S. and Poland.

In May 2025, Lockheed Martin received a $114.6 million contract from the United States Army for Engineering and Manufacturing Development (EMD) work related to the Remote Interceptor Guidance-360 (RIG-360) system for the Patriot PAC-3 missile family. According to Lockheed Martin, the RIG-360 architecture is intended to provide 360-degree in-flight communication and engagement capability through integration with the Integrated Battle Command System (IBCS), addressing limitations associated with the Patriot system's traditional sector-focused radar coverage. The contract also included work on containerized launcher concepts and prototype production, with completion scheduled for 2027.

== Patriot battalion ==
In the U.S. Army, the Patriot System is designed around the battalion echelon. A Patriot battalion consists of a headquarters battery, which includes the Patriot ICC and its operators, a maintenance company, and between four and six "line batteries", which are the actual launching batteries that employ the Patriot systems. Each line battery consists of (nominally) six launchers and three or four platoons: Fire Control platoon, Launcher platoon, and a Headquarters/Maintenance platoon - either a single platoon or separated into two separate units, at the battery commander's discretion.

The Fire Control platoon is responsible for operating and maintaining the "big 4", radar, the engagement control station, the antenna mast group, and the electric power plant. The launcher platoon operates and maintains the launchers. The Headquarters/Maintenance platoon(s) provide the battery with maintenance support and a headquarters section. The Patriot line battery is commanded by a captain and usually consists of between 70 and 90 soldiers. The Patriot battalion is commanded by a lieutenant colonel and can include as many as 600 soldiers.

Once deployed, the system requires a crew of only three individuals to operate. The Tactical Control Officer (TCO), usually a lieutenant, is responsible for the operation of the system. The TCO is assisted by the Tactical Control Assistant (TCA). Communications are handled by the third crewmember, the communications system specialist. A "hot-crew" composed of an NCOIC (usually a Sergeant) and one or more additional launcher crew members is on-hand to repair or refuel launching stations. A reload crew is on standby to replace spent canisters after missiles are launched. The ICC crew is similar to the ECS crew at the battery level, except its operators are designated as the Tactical Director (TD) and the Tactical Director Assistant (TDA).

Patriot battalions prefer to operate in a centralized fashion, with the ICC controlling the launches of all of its subordinate launching batteries through the secure UHF PADIL communications network.

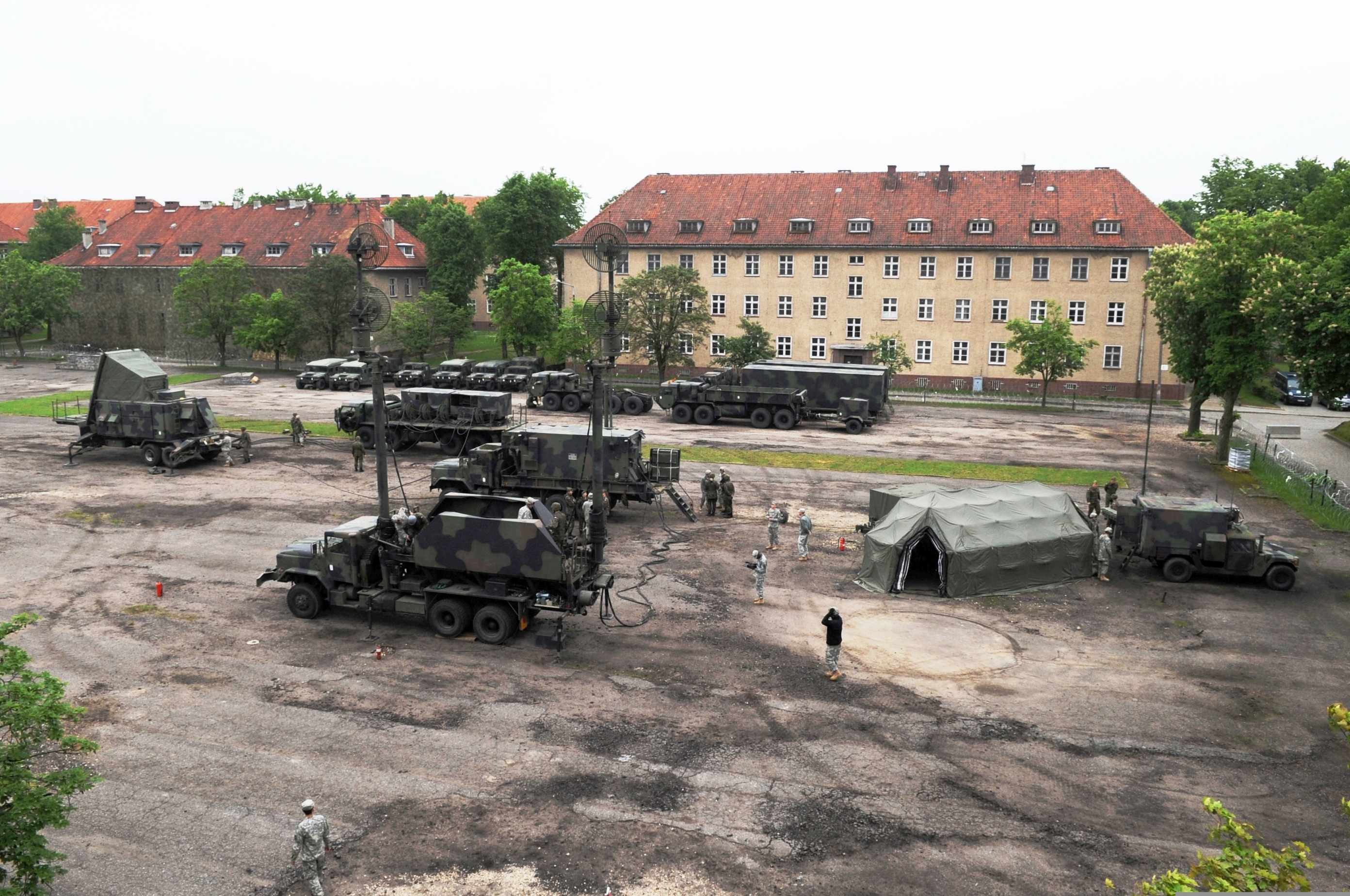
U.S. soldiers familiarize members of the Polish military with preventive maintenance for Patriot missile systems in Morąg, Poland, June 2010

The dismounted Patriot ICC (D-PICC) is a set of equipment which is composed of the same hardware as that at battalion level, but which distributes command and control over the launching batteries, which allows the batteries to disperse over a wider geographic area, with no loss of command and control. D-PICC is deploying to Pacific Command first.

U.S. Army Patriot battalions have been heavily deployed, and for years maintained the highest operational tempo across any units in the service with the longest deployments.

=== Operation ===
==== Engaging a single aircraft ====
Following is the process a PAC-2 firing battery uses to engage a single target (an aircraft) with a single missile:

1. A hostile aircraft is detected by the AN/MPQ-65 Radar. The radar examines the track's size, speed, altitude, and heading, and decides whether or not it is a legitimate track or "clutter" created by RF interference.
2. If the track is classified by the radar as an aircraft, in the AN/MSQ-104 Engagement Control Station, an unidentified track appears on the screen of the Patriot operators. The operators examine the speed, altitude and heading of the track. Additionally, the IFF subsystem "pings" the track to determine if it has any IFF response.
3. Based on many factors, including the track's speed, altitude, heading, IFF response, or its presence in "safe passage corridors" or "missile engagement zones", the ECS operator, the TCO (tactical control officer), makes an ID recommendation to the ICC operator, the TD (tactical director).
4. The TD examines the track and decides to certify that it is hostile. Typically, the engagement authority for Patriot units rests with the Regional or Sector Air Defense Commander (RADC/SADC), who will be located either on a U.S. Navy guided missile cruiser or on a USAF AWACS aircraft. A Patriot operator (called the "ADAFCO" or Air Defense Artillery Fire Control Officer) is colocated with the RADC/SADC to facilitate communication to the Patriot battalions.
5. The TD contacts the ADAFCO and correlates the track, ensuring that it is not a friendly aircraft.
6. The ADAFCO obtains the engagement command from RADC/SADC, and delegates the engagement back down to the Patriot battalion.
7. Once the engagement command is received, the TD selects a firing battery to take the shot and orders them to engage.
8. The TCO instructs the TCA to engage the track. The TCA brings the system's launchers from "standby" into "operate".
9. The TCA presses the "engage" switch indicator. This sends a signal to the selected launcher and fires a missile selected automatically by the system.
10. The AN/MPQ-65 Radar, which has been continuously tracking the hostile aircraft, "acquires" the just-fired missile and begins feeding it interception data. The Radar also "illuminates" the target for the missile's semi-active radar seeker.
11. The monopulse receiver in the missile's nose receives the reflection of illumination energy from the target. The track-via-missile uplink sends this data through an antenna in the missile's tail back to the AN/MPQ-65 set. In the ECS, computers calculate the maneuvers that the missile should perform in order to maintain a trajectory to the target and the TVM uplink sends these to the missile.
12. Once in the vicinity of the target, the missile detonates its proximity fused warhead.

==== Engaging a ballistic missile ====
Following is the process a PAC-3 firing battery uses to engage a single tactical ballistic missile with two PAC-3 missiles:

1. A missile is detected by the AN/MPQ-65 radar. The radar reviews the speed, altitude, behavior, and radar cross-section of the target. If this data lines up with the discrimination parameters set into the system, the missile is presented on the screen of the operator as a ballistic missile target.
2. In the AN/MSQ-104 Engagement Control Station, the TCO reviews the speed, altitude, and trajectory of the track and then authorizes engagement. Upon authorizing engagement, the TCO instructs his TCA to bring the system's launchers into "operate" mode from "standby" mode. The engagement will take place automatically at the moment the computer defines the parameters that ensure the highest probability of kill.
3. The system computer determines which of the battery's launchers have the highest probability of kill and selects them to fire. Two missiles are launched 4.2 seconds apart in a "ripple".
4. The AN/MPQ-65 radar continues tracking the target and uploads intercept information to the PAC-3 missiles which are now outbound to intercept.
5. Upon reaching its terminal homing phase, the Ka band active radar seeker in the nose of the PAC-3 missile acquires the inbound ballistic missile. This radar selects the radar return most likely to be the warhead of the incoming missile and directs the interceptor towards it.
6. The ACMs (attitude control motors) of the PAC-3 missile fire to precisely align the missile on the interception trajectory.
7. The interceptor flies straight through the warhead of the inbound ballistic missile, detonating it and destroying the missile.
8. The second missile locates any debris which may be a warhead and attacks in a similar manner.

== Operational history ==
=== Persian Gulf War (1991) ===
==== Trial by fire ====
Prior to the First Gulf War, ballistic missile defense was an unproven concept in war. During Operation Desert Storm, in addition to its anti-aircraft mission, the Patriot was assigned to shoot down incoming Iraqi Scud or Al Hussein short range ballistic missiles launched at Israel and Saudi Arabia. The first combat use of Patriot occurred January 18, 1991, when it engaged what was later found to be a computer glitch. There were actually no Scuds fired at Saudi Arabia on January 18. This incident was widely misreported as the first successful interception of an enemy ballistic missile in history.

Throughout the war, Patriot missiles attempted engagement of over 40 hostile ballistic missiles. The success of these engagements, and in particular how many of them were real targets, is still controversial. Postwar video analysis of presumed interceptions by Massachusetts Institute of Technology (MIT) professor Theodore Postol suggests that no Scud was actually hit. This analysis is contested by Peter D. Zimmerman, who claimed that photographs of the fuselage of downed Scud missiles in Saudi Arabia demonstrated that the Scud missiles were fired into Saudi Arabia and were riddled with fragments from the lethality enhancer of Patriot Missiles.

==== Failure at Dhahran ====
On February 25, 1991, an Iraqi Al Hussein Scud missile hit the barracks in Dhahran, Saudi Arabia, killing 28 soldiers from the U.S. Army's 14th Quartermaster Detachment.

A government investigation revealed that the failed intercept at Dhahran had been caused by a software error in the system's handling of timestamps. The Patriot missile battery at Dhahran had been in operation for 100 hours, by which time the system's internal clock had drifted by one-third of a second. Due to the missile's speed this was equivalent to a miss distance of 600 meters.

The radar system had successfully detected the Scud and predicted where to look for it next. However, the timestamps of the two radar pulses being compared were converted to floating point differently: one correctly, the other introducing an error proportionate to the operation time so far (100 hours) caused by the truncation in a 24-bit fixed-point register. As a result, the difference between the pulses was wrong, so the system looked in the wrong part of the sky and found no target. With no target, the initial detection was assumed to be a spurious track and the missile was removed from the system. No interception was attempted, and the Scud impacted on a makeshift barracks in an Al Khobar warehouse, killing 28 soldiers, the first Americans to be killed from the Scuds that Iraq had launched against Saudi Arabia and Israel.

Two weeks earlier, on February 11, 1991, the Israelis had identified the problem and informed the U.S. Army and the PATRIOT Project Office, the software manufacturer. As a stopgap measure, the Israelis had recommended rebooting the system's computers regularly. The manufacturer supplied updated software to the Army on February 26.

There had previously been failures in the MIM-104 system at the Joint Defense Facility Nurrungar in Australia, which was charged with processing signals from satellite-based early launch detection systems.

==== Success rate vs. accuracy ====
On February 15, 1991, President George H. W. Bush traveled to Raytheon's Patriot manufacturing plant in Andover, Massachusetts, during the Gulf War. He declared, the "Patriot is 41 for 42: 42 Scuds engaged, 41 intercepted!" The President's claimed success rate was over 97% at that point in the war.

On April 7, 1992, Theodore Postol of MIT, and Reuven Pedatzur of Tel Aviv University testified before a House Committee claiming that, according to their independent analysis of video tapes, the Patriot system had a success rate of below 10%, and perhaps even a zero success rate.

On April 7, 1992, Charles A. Zraket of Harvard Kennedy School and Peter Zimmerman of the Center for Strategic and International Studies, a think tank funded by the United States government and Raytheon, testified about the calculation of success rates and accuracy in Israel and Saudi Arabia and discounted many of the statements and methodologies in Postol's report. According to Zimmerman, the difference in terms in important in analyzing the performance of the system during the war:

- Success rate – the percentage of Scuds destroyed or deflected to unpopulated areas
- Accuracy – the percentage of hits out of all the Patriots fired

In accordance with the standard firing doctrine, on average four Patriots were launched at each incoming Scud – in Saudi Arabia an average of three Patriots were fired. The large number of missiles fired suggests low confidence in individual missiles and that a higher rate of successful interceptions was achieved through brute force. For example, if a Patriot has a 50% individual success rate, two missiles will intercept 75% of the time, and three will intercept 87.5% of the time. Only one has to hit for a successful interception, but this does not mean that the other missiles would not also have hit.

The Iraqi redesign of the Scuds also played a role. Iraq had redesigned its Scuds by removing weight from the warhead to increase speed and range, but the changes weakened the missile and made it unstable during flight, creating a tendency for the Scud to break up during its descent from near space. This presented a larger number of targets as it was unclear which piece contained the warhead.

According to the Zraket testimony, there was a lack of high quality photographic equipment necessary to record the interceptions of targets. Therefore, Patriot crews recorded each launch on standard-definition videotape, which was insufficient for detailed analysis. Damage assessment teams videotaped the Scud debris that was found on the ground. Crater analysis was then used to determine if the warhead was destroyed before the debris crashed or not. Part of the reason for the 30% improvement in success rate in Saudi Arabia compared to Israel is that the Patriot merely had to push the incoming Scud missiles away from military targets in the desert or disable the Scud's warhead in order to avoid casualties, while in Israel the Scuds were aimed directly at cities and civilian populations.

The Saudi Government also censored any reporting of Scud damage by the Saudi press. The Israeli Government did not institute the same type of censorship. Patriot's success rate in Israel was examined by the Israel Defense Forces (IDF) who did not have a political reason to play up Patriot's success rate. The IDF counted any Scud that exploded on the ground, regardless of whether or not it was diverted, as a failure for the Patriot. Meanwhile, the U.S. Army, which had many reasons to support a high success rate for Patriot, examined the performance of Patriot in Saudi Arabia.

Both testimonies state that part of the problems stem from its original design as an anti-aircraft system. Patriot was designed with proximity fused warheads, which are designed to explode immediately prior to hitting a target spraying shrapnel out in a fan in front of the missile, either destroying or disabling the target. These missiles were fired at the target's center of mass. With aircraft this was fine, but considering the much higher speeds of tactical ballistic missiles, as well as the location of the warhead, usually in the nose, Patriot most often hit closer to the tail of the Scud due to the delay present in the proximity fused warhead, thus not destroying the missile's warhead and allowing it to fall to earth.

In response to the testimonies and other evidence, the staff of the House Government Operations Subcommittee on Legislation and National Security reported, "The Patriot missile system was not the spectacular success in the Persian Gulf War that the American public was led to believe. There is little evidence to prove that the Patriot hit more than a few Scud missiles launched by Iraq during the Gulf War, and there are some doubts about even these engagements. The public and the United States Congress were misled by definitive statements of success issued by administration and Raytheon representatives during and after the war."

=== US-led invasion of Iraq (2003) ===
Patriot was deployed to Iraq a second time in 2003, this time to provide air and missile defense for the forces conducting Operation Iraqi Freedom (OIF). Patriot PAC-3, GEM, and GEM+ missiles both had a very high success rate, intercepting Al-Samoud 2 and Ababil-100 tactical ballistic missiles. No longer-range ballistic missiles were fired during that conflict. The systems were stationed in Kuwait and Iraq, and successfully destroyed a number of hostile surface-to-surface missiles using the new PAC-3 and guidance enhanced missiles.

Patriot missile batteries were involved in three friendly fire incidents. On March 23, 2003, a Panavia Tornado of the Royal Air Force was shot down, killing both crew members, Flight Lieutenant Kevin Barry Main (pilot) and Flight Lieutenant David Rhys Williams (navigator/WSO). On March 24, 2003, a USAF F-16CJ Fighting Falcon fired a HARM anti-radiation missile at a Patriot missile battery after the Patriot's radar had locked onto and prepared to fire at the aircraft, causing the pilot to mistake it for an Iraqi surface-to-air missile system because the aircraft was in air combat operations and was on its way to a mission near Baghdad. The HARM destroyed the Patriot's radar system with no casualties. Afterwards the Patriot Radar was examined and continued to operate, but was replaced due to a chance that a fragment might have penetrated it and gone undetected.

On April 2, 2003, two PAC-3 missiles shot down a USN F/A-18 Hornet, killing U.S. Navy Lieutenant Nathan D. White of VFA-195, Carrier Air Wing Five.

=== Post-2003 service in Iraq ===
A US Army Patriot battery in Erbil, Iraq shot down at least one Iranian ballistic missile during the 2024 Iranian strikes in Israel.

=== 2026 Iran War ===
An explosion near Manama sparked a fire near a petroleum refinery and resulted in injuries to at least 32 Bahraini citizens, four of them "serious cases" during the 2026 Iran War. An analysis by academic researchers examined by Reuters found that an American-operated Patriot missile was likely involved in the blast after it downed an Iranian drone mid-air.

=== Service with Israel ===
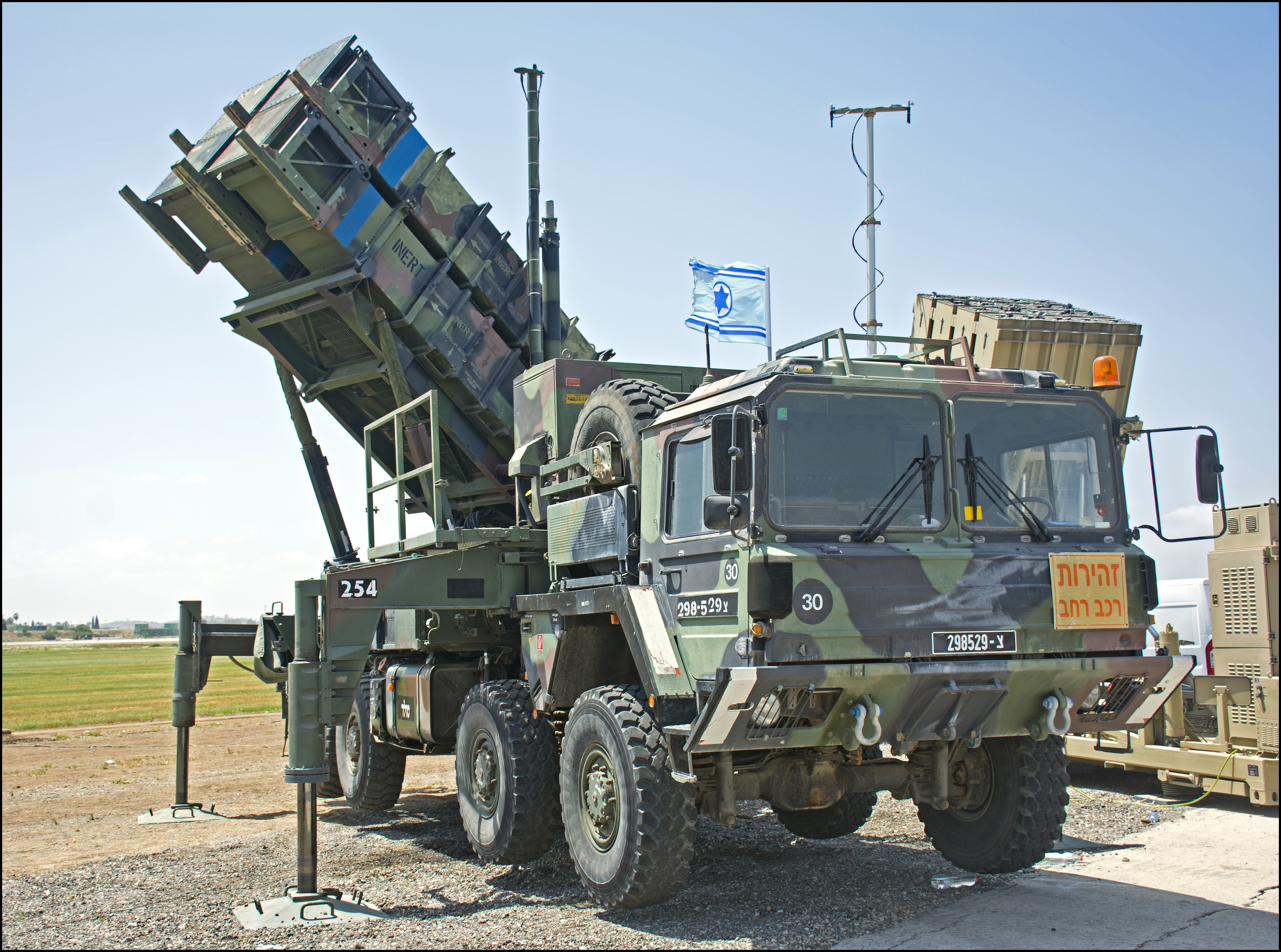
An Israeli Patriot launcher on display for Yom Ha'atzmaut 2017

The Israeli Air Defense Command operated MIM-104D Patriot (PAC-2/GEM+) batteries with Israeli upgrades. The Israel Defense Forces' designation for the Patriot weapon system was "Yahalom" (Hebrew: יהלום, diamond).

==== Operation Protective Edge (2014) ====
During Operation Protective Edge, Patriot batteries of the Israeli Air Defense Command intercepted and destroyed two unmanned aerial vehicles launched by Hamas. The interception of a Hamas drone in July 2014, was the first time in the history of the Patriot system's use that it successfully intercepted an enemy aircraft.

==== Syrian civil war (2014–2024) ====
In Israeli service in the Syrian civil war, Patriot has primarily been active in drone and air defense, rather than a missile defense capacity. In August 2014, a Syrian unmanned aerial vehicle was shot down by an Israeli Air Defense Command MIM-104D Patriot missile near Quneitra, after it had penetrated the airspace over the Israeli-controlled Golan Heights. In September 2014, a Syrian Air Force Sukhoi Su-24 was shot down in similar circumstances.

Since 2014, Israeli Patriots have missed several Syrian drones, including two misses in July 2016 and another in June 2018; as well as several successful shootdowns against Syrian drones in April 2017 July 11 and 13, 2018, as well as against a Hezbollah intelligence drone attempting to infiltrate Israel in September 2017 through the Golan. On July 24, 2018, an Israeli Patriot missile shot down a Syrian Sukhoi Su-22 fighter which had crossed into Israeli airspace.

Patriots were in active use by the IDF in the "southern Negev desert" in 2023.

==== Retirement ====
On April 30, 2024, the Israeli Air Force published an article stating that their Patriot batteries would be decommissioned in two months, being replaced by "more advanced air systems". According to The War Zone, the Patriot was replaced by the David's Sling and Arrow systems.

==== Transfer to Ukraine ====
Following the retirement announcement, Ukraine initiated talks on obtaining the Israeli Patriot systems in April 2024. Axios reported that Israeli Prime Minister Benjamin Netanyahu approved their transfer in September 2024.

On January 28, 2025, a US defense official confirmed to the CNN that 90 ex-Israeli interceptors were transferred to Ukraine via the United States. Reportedly Kyiv will also receive components for the system, including radars, after being refurbished in the US.

In June 2025, the Foreign Ministry of Israel denied providing Patriot air defense systems to Ukraine, contradicting an earlier suggestion by its envoy in Kyiv that such a transfer had occurred.

On September 27, 2025, Ukrainian President Volodymyr Zelenskyy confirmed that Israel had supplied Ukraine with a Patriot air defense battery, stating that the system was already installed and operational. Zelenskyy further announced that two additional Patriot batteries would be delivered by Israel in the fall of 2025.

=== Service with Saudi Arabia ===
Patriot has continued to see usage in Saudi Arabia against Houthi missile attacks. In June 2015, a Patriot battery was used to shoot down a Scud missile, fired at Saudi Arabia by Houthi rebels in response to the Saudi Arabian-led intervention in Yemen. Another Scud was fired at an electricity station in Jizan Province and intercepted by a Saudi Patriot in August 2015. Saudi Arabia claims that another long-range ballistic missile was fired toward Mecca and intercepted by a Saudi Patriot in October 2016. Houthi sources said that the missile's intended target was the air force base in King Abdulaziz International Airport in Jeddah, 65 km (40 miles) north-west of Mecca. In March 2018, another missile, apparently fired from Yemen, was intercepted by a Patriot missile over Riyadh. Videos showed one interceptor exploded just after launch and another did a "U turn" midair toward Riyadh. During the Abqaiq–Khurais attack in September 2019, the six battalions of Patriot missile defense systems owned by Saudi Arabia failed to protect its oil facilities from attacks by multiple drones and suspected cruise missiles. The United States removed two of its four Patriot antimissile batteries securing oil fields in Saudi Arabia in May 2020, following an easing of tensions with Iran. They were to be replaced by Saudi's own Patriot batteries. In February 2021, a Patriot battery intercepted a ballistic missile over Riyadh that was fired by Houthis as a Formula E race was held on the outskirts of the city in Diriyah, attended by Crown Prince Mohammed bin Salman.

=== Service with the United Arab Emirates ===
According to Brigadier General Murad Turaiq, the commander of some of the Yemeni forces allied to the Saudi-led coalition currently fighting in Yemen, Patriot air defense systems deployed to Yemen by the United Arab Emirates (UAE) have successfully intercepted two ballistic missiles fired by Houthi forces. General Turaiq told the Abu Dhabi-based The National newspaper on November 14, 2015, that the first missile was shot down late the previous day in the Al-Gofainah area and a second was intercepted before it hit the building hosting the control centre for forces operating in Marib and Al-Baydah provinces. Airbus Defence and Space satellite imagery obtained by IHS Jane's showed two Patriot fire units, each with two launchers, deployed at the Safir airstrip in Marib province on October 1.

=== Service with Eastern Europe ===
==== Patriot sales and contributions to Poland and Ukraine ====
Russia's 2014 invasion of Crimea led to a "sales burst" for the Patriot system, with Romania, Poland, and Sweden signing onto the system between the start of the invasion and the wider invasion of Ukraine in 2022. In response to Russia's invasion of Ukraine, on March 9, 2022, the U.S. European Command announced that it would send two Patriot air defense systems to Poland to "proactively counter any potential threat to U.S. and Allied forces and NATO territory". Poland asked Germany to transfer the Patriots to Ukraine. Germany declined. On December 19, Ukraine President Zelenskyy talked about negotiating personally with US President Biden over a potential transfer of Patriot missile systems. He said they offer "a (better) distance, radius of reflection, protection". Ukrainian Foreign Minister Dmytro Kuleba said that this was the most difficult diplomatic issue they had faced. One day later, the Biden administration announced it would be delivering another $1.85 billion in aid to Ukraine that would include a Patriot battery. During a meeting with Zelenskyy in front of the press at the White House on December 21, Biden confirmed that the United States would send a Patriot battery to Ukraine, noting that it would take "months" to train the "dozens" of soldiers needed to operate the system, probably in Germany. Providing a Patriot missile system is seen as a symbol of Western engagement in the conflict, although its range is only local.

Other nations subsequently announced plans to send their own Patriot batteries. On January 5, 2023, Germany announced that it would supply one Patriot battery to Ukraine as a part of their own military aid package. On January 17, 2023, the Netherlands announced it too will send one launcher, and added a second launcher on January 20. The Dutch government announced it will send launchers (Dutch: lanceerinrichtingen) and missiles, not complete systems (a battery) which includes radars, etc. On April 19, a German government website announced that the country had delivered a Patriot system to Ukraine. A second Patriot battery was delivered on April 27 from the United States. On August 9, 2023, it was announced that Germany would provide an additional complete Patriot battery to Ukraine. The system was delivered on December 13 after the Ukrainian crew completed training in Germany. So, during 2023, three Patriot batteries were delivered to Ukraine.

==== Patriot operations in the Russo-Ukrainian War ====
Patriot has had a successful track record in Ukraine during the Russo-Ukrainian War, successfully intercepting a wide range of Russian weaponry and aircraft. It has shot down Russian aircraft like Su-34 fighters flying nearly 100 miles away, and intercepted missiles as far as 130 miles away, according to defense NGO reports. During October 2023, under a program called "FrankenSAM" Western and Soviet air defence technologies are being combined in Ukraine. One of three programs involves a Ukrainian radar guiding a Patriot missile. It has been tested and is expected to be operational by winter.

===== Aircraft interceptions - May 2023 =====
On May 13, 2023, a Patriot battery was allegedly used to destroy at least four (possibly five) aircraft belonging to a Russian strike package over Bryansk Oblast, Russia. Visually confirmed losses included a Su-34, Su-35, and two Mil Mi-8 helicopters. On May 19, U.S. defense officials and congressional staffers told CNN that a Patriot system had been used by the Ukrainian army to shoot down at least one Russian jet a few weeks before. The spokesman of the Ukrainian Air Force later confirmed the shoot down of a Russian Su-34, Su-35, two Mi-8MTPR EW helicopters, and an Mi-8 transport helicopter by the Patriot system.

===== Missile defense =====
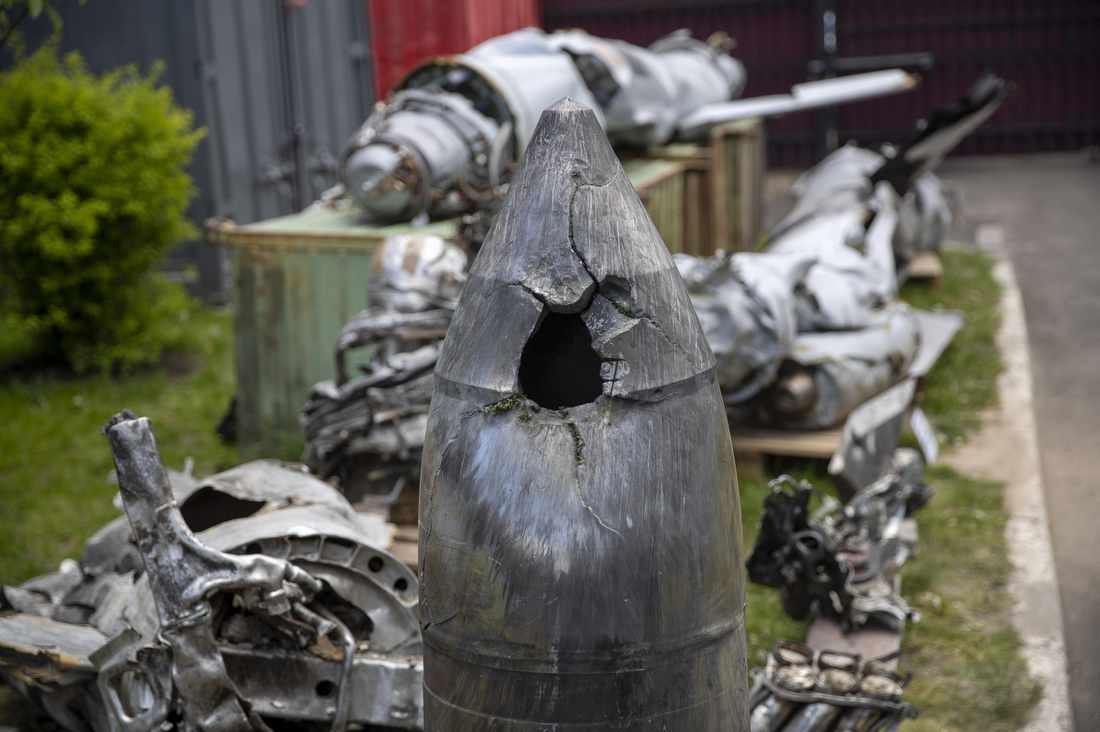
Debris presented by Ukraine in May 2023, stated to be from a Kinzhal missile

During a night time attack on the Kyiv region on May 4, 2023, Ukraine air defense claimed a hypersonic Kh-47M2 Kinzhal ballistic missile was shot down by a Patriot missile defence system. Yurii Ihnat, the spokesman for the Ukrainian Air Force, initially denied the claim of interception, but on May 6 it was finally confirmed by Commander of the UAF Mykola Oleschuk. Prior to this interception, intercepting a Kinzhal missile was only a "theoretical" capability. Unnamed US officials claimed the missile was aimed at the Patriot system which intercepted it, and that the Ukrainians fired multiple Patriot missiles at different angles to intercept the Kinzhal missile. A Pentagon spokesman later confirmed that Ukraine downed the Kinzhal missile.

On May 16, 2023, the Ukrainian Air Force claimed to have shot down eighteen missiles, including six Kh-47M2 Kinzhal missiles, and uncertain number of attack drones. The Russian Defense Ministry stated in response that six Kinzhal missiles hadn't even been fired, and furthermore claimed that a Patriot battery in Kyiv was destroyed by a Kinzhal missile, citing social media footage.

U.S. officials confirmed that the Patriot system was damaged, but stated that the damage was "minimal" or "insignificant", the radar was intact and that the system could likely be repaired locally without needing to be moved out of Ukraine. The battery was returned to operational status after minor repairs. It has not yet been established whether the Patriot had been damaged by the fragments of the downed Russian missile or by a direct hit.

The following day, U.S. officials told the New York Times that "a Patriot system had been damaged in the attack but added that the Patriot remained operational against all threats," while Deputy Pentagon Spokeswoman Sabrina Singh announced that the Patriot system had been fixed, with assistance from the US. In contradiction to the U.S. announcement, the Russian Ministry of Defense claimed that the system's multifunctional radar station and five launchers were destroyed.

After two missile attacks on May 29, 2023, Ukrainian President Zelenskyy announced that all missiles were intercepted and according to Ukrainian Air Force spokesman, Yuriy Ihnat, these were assumed to likely be Iskander-M ballistic missiles. Dashcam video captured the debris from an expended PAC-3 CRI missile falling in between passing vehicles.

According to a report by the US Defense Intelligence Agency, Russia upgraded 9K720 Iskander and Kh-47M2 Kinzhal missiles with a terminal phase maneuvering capability in spring 2025 in order to bypass Ukraine's Patriot systems. A Financial Times article from October 2025 said, citing current and former Ukrainian and Western officials, that interception rates dropped from 37% in August to 6% in September, allowing Russia to seriously damage key military sites, four drone plants, and critical infrastructure ahead of the winter.

According to the French Army, Ukrainian SAMP/T air defence systems have outperformed Patriot missiles in intercepting Iskander missile, after Russia modified the flight profiles of Iskanders.

==== Losses ====
On March 9, 2024, video footage emerged showing the destruction of an Armed Forces of Ukraine convoy that allegedly contained at least two M901 Patriot missile launchers near the city of Pokrovsk in Donetsk Oblast. The convoy was reportedly struck by a Russian Iskander-M ballistic missile. The Armed Forces of Ukraine has not commented on the video.

On April 5, 2024, a damaged Ukrainian Patriot launcher was delivered to the United States. It is not yet known exactly where the launcher was damaged.

According to Frankfurter Allgemeine Zeitung, a Patriot radar was allegedly damaged in a Russian strike and deemed unrepairable by the manufacturer, but was repaired by military technical staff from the German Luftwaffe working sixteen hours a day from Monday to Saturday. The radar was transported back to Ukraine in July 2025 and by early August had been used in a successful intercept of a Russian strike.

According to Oryx, on 24 September 2025 a Ukrainian AN/MPQ-53 Patriot radar site was destroyed in an Iskander strike.

== Demands on Patriot systems ==
=== Stockpile depletion and replacement ===
Including the United States, 18 countries operate Patriot missile systems. Outside the US, only Japan's Mitsubishi Heavy Industries appears to build Patriot missiles, under licence from various US companies. This has led to a demand on the US Army. Patriot batteries are the most deployed units in the US Army by early 2021. Some units have had a six-month deployment extended up to 15 months. The missile is currently being used in active service in Saudi Arabia. The Patriot missile batteries are also seeing active service in Ukraine, where there are three batteries in service. To refill US stockpiles, Japan has modified its export rules to allow export of missiles to the United States. Previously only specific components could be exported; now entire missiles can be exported. They cannot be sent directly to Ukraine, however they can backfill US stockpiles. Recent withdrawal of the missiles from the Middle East were done to help deal with a potential crisis in the Pacific. Likewise Germany has withdrawn its three Patriot units from Poland.

In January 2024, NATO announced a plan to purchase approximately 1000 Patriot missiles. A $5.5 billion contract was awarded to Raytheon and MBDA to establish a new production facility in Germany. The U.S. is also ramping up production domestically. In 2018, Lockheed Martin was building 350 PAC-3 MSE missiles annually and was working to ramp up its production to 500 missiles a year prior to Russia's full-scale invasion of Ukraine in February 2022. In December 2023, Lockheed hit their production goal of 500 missiles per year, and is "fully funded by the U.S. Army to build 550 missiles annually" at its new 85,000-square-foot Camden, Arkansas facility. Lockheed has announced plans to ramp up production of PAC-3 MSE interceptors to 650 annually by 2027, though it notes this will be done through internal investment, having not received Army funding for the production increase. Lockheed also intends to increase export shipments for the missile, with six new international customers signing letters of approval in 2023. Aerojet Rocketdyne, which produces the PAC-3 MSE motor, opened a 51,000-square-foot production facility next to Lockheed's Camden site in 2022, and has increased rocket motor production by 60% from 70,000 in 2021 to 115,000 in 2023 across all types including the PAC-3 MSE rocket motor.

On June 20, 2024, the US government was set to announce the suspension of all exports of Patriot missiles and systems "until Ukraine has enough to defend itself from Russia's air attacks". This decision affects five countries who have agreed to the suspension. The Romanian government has announced that it will send a "full" Patriot battery to Ukraine, provided that the US government "help(s) cover the gap".

In May 2025, US Secretary of State Marco Rubio told the Senate Foreign Relations Committee "frankly, we don't have" spare Patriot systems for Ukraine, and the US was encouraging NATO allies to donate Patriot missiles and systems from their stock.

On 8 July 2026, during the NATO summit in Turkey, American president Donald Trump announced that the US would give a license to manufacture Patriot missiles to Ukraine.

Bloomberg's analysis indicated that Lockheed Martin said it could take until 2030 for production capacity to become available.

== Operators ==
MIM-104 operators. Current

Current operators:

=== Current ===
Egypt

- Egyptian Air Defense Forces: In 1999, Egypt acquired 32 Patriot-3 (MIM-104-F/PAC-3) missile systems from the United States for $1.3 billion.

Germany

- German Air Force (9 systems with 72 launchers + 8 systems with 64 launchers on order)
  - Flugabwehrraketengeschwader 1
    - Air Defence Missile Group 21 (Flugabwehrraketengruppe 21)
    - Air Defence Missile Group 24 (Flugabwehrraketengruppe 24)
    - Air Defence Missile Group 26 (Flugabwehrraketengruppe 26)
    - Air Defence Missile Group 61 (Flugabwehrraketengruppe 61)

Greece

- Hellenic Air Force
  - 350 Guided Missiles Wing
    - 21st Guided Missile Squadron
    - 22nd Guided Missile Squadron
    - 23rd Guided Missile Squadron
    - 24th Guided Missile Squadron
    - 25th Guided Missile Squadron
    - 26th Guided Missile Squadron

Japan

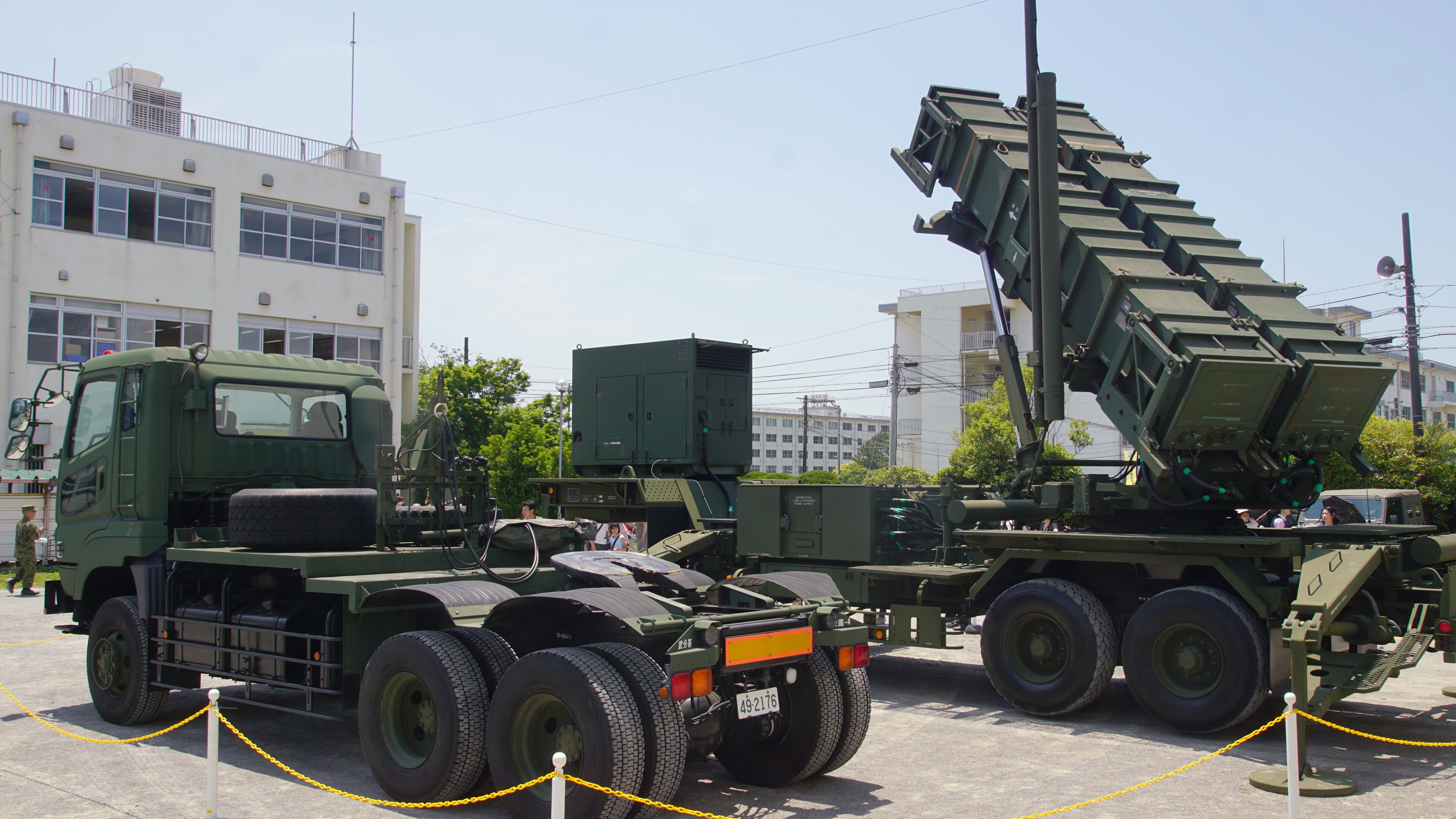
A Japan Air Self-Defense Force Patriot PAC-2 launcher

- Japan Air Self-Defense Force
  - Air Defense Missile Training Unit (ADMTU) (PAC-2 & PAC-3)
  - 1st Air Defense Missile Group (1st ADMG) (PAC-2 & PAC-3)
  - 2nd Air Defense Missile Group (2nd ADMG) (PAC-2 & PAC-3)
  - 3rd Air Defense Missile Group (3rd ADMG) (PAC-2 & PAC-3)
  - 4th Air Defense Missile Group (4th ADMG) (PAC-2 & PAC-3)
  - 5th Air Defense Missile Group (5th ADMG) (PAC-2 & PAC-3)
  - 6th Air Defense Missile Group (6th ADMG) (PAC-2 & PAC-3)

Jordan

- Royal Jordanian Air Force

The RJAF operates three or four Patriot missile batteries, acquired from Germany. Batteries are in operational deployment.

Kuwait

- Kuwait Air Force

In August 2010, the US Defense Security Cooperation Agency announced that Kuwait had formally requested to buy 209 MIM-104E PAC-2 missiles. In August 2012, Kuwait purchased 60 MIM-104F PAC-3 missiles, along with four radars and 20 launchers.

Netherlands

- Royal Netherlands Army
  - Joint Ground-based Air Defence Command 802 Squadron (PAC-2 & PAC-3 MSE).

Poland

- Polish Air Force (2 systems + 6 systems on order)
  - 3rd "Warsaw" Air Defence Missile Brigade - Sochaczew-Bielice

In March 2018 the Ministry of National Defence signed a deal worth $4.75 billion for two Patriot Configuration 3+ batteries, to be delivered in 2022. The purchase included Northrop Grumman's Integrated Air and Missile Defense Battle Command System (IBCS) and four fire units equipped with four AN/MPQ-65 radars, 16 launchers, four Engagement Control Stations, six Engagement Operation Centers, 12 IFCN Relays and 208 PAC-3 MSE missiles. In December 2022 the first battery was delivered to Poland.

In June 2023, the State Department approved a potential sale of additional IBCS-capable equipment valued at $15 billion, which included 12 LTAMDS (GhostEye) radars, 48 M903 launchers, and 644 PAC-3 MSE missiles. In September 2023, contracts for the purchase of six complete Patriot batteries with a training, service and logistics package were signed and approved by the Minister of National Defense Mariusz Błaszczak, at the International Defense Industry Exhibition in Kielce, Poland. As of April 2025 Poland is manufacturing transport and launch containers for PAC-3 MSE. In April 2025, Lockheed Martin took delivery of the container from the Polish factory at Wojskowe Zakłady Lotnicze Nr 1.

Qatar

- Qatar Emiri Air Force

In November 2012, it was announced the export from the United States of 11 Patriot batteries (PAC-3 configuration), 246 MIM-104E GEM-T and 786 PAC-3 missiles and related equipment. Declared operational in November 2018.

Romania

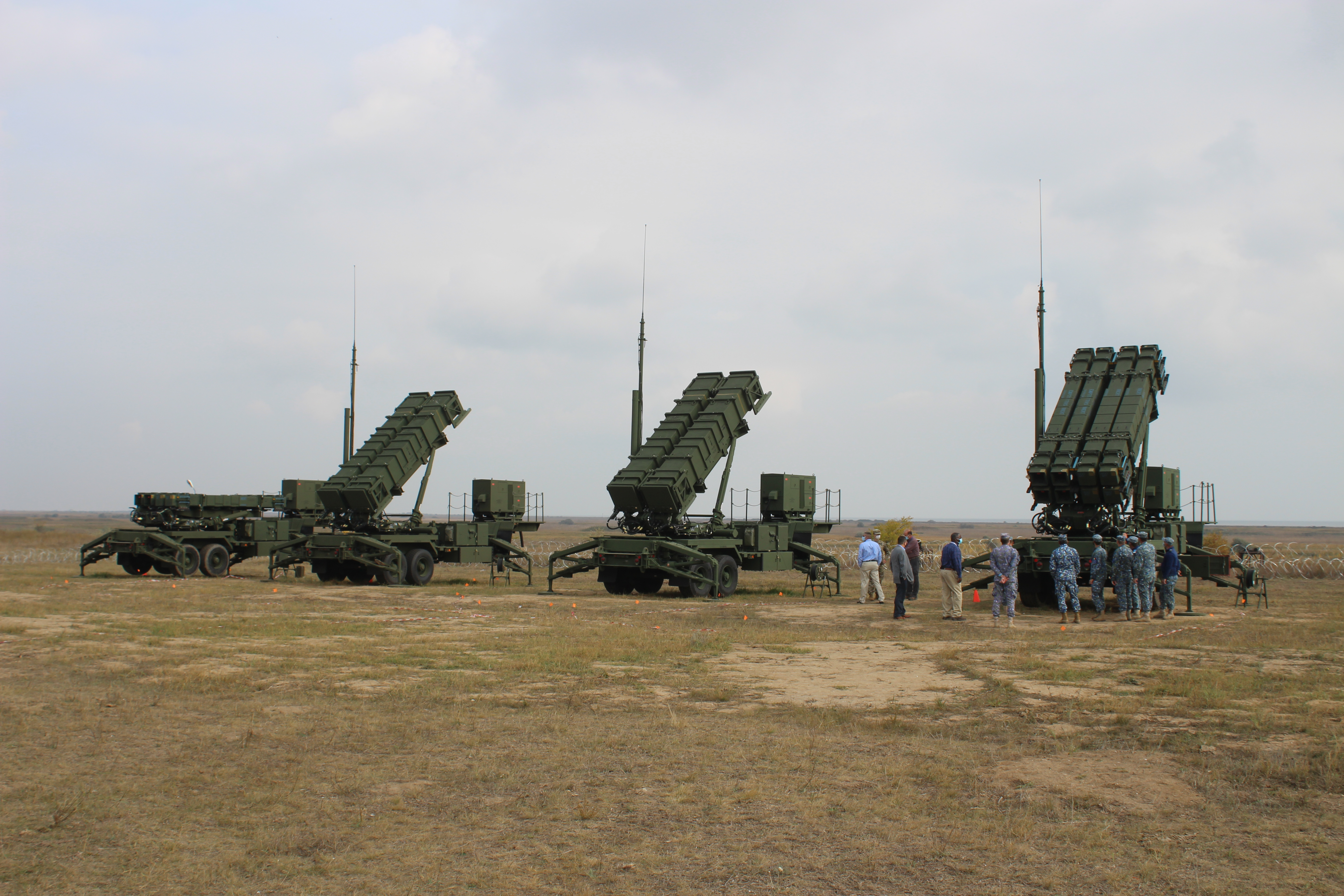
Romanian PAC-2 and PAC-3 MSE launchers

- Romanian Air Force
  - 74th Patriot Regiment (PAC-2 GEM-T & PAC-3 MSE)

The Romanian Air Force received its first system of Patriot surface-to-air missiles in September 2020, with the last three received by 2023. The government of Romania signed in the agreement to purchase seven Patriot Configuration 3 units, complete with radars, a control station, antennas, launching stations, and power plants in November 2017. Included are 168 Patriot Advanced Capability – 3 Missile Segment Enhancement (PAC-3 MSE) and 56 Patriot MIM-104E PAC-2 Guidance Enhanced Missile TBM (GEM-T) missiles. The agreement was valued at around $4 billion.

Saudi Arabia

- Royal Saudi Air Defense
- Part of "Peace Shield" Air Defense Profile

South Korea

- Republic of Korea Air Force Air Defense & Guided Missile Command
  - 1st Air Defense Artillery Brigade (1st ADAB) (PAC-2 & PAC-3)
  - 2nd Air Defense Artillery Brigade (2nd ADAB) (PAC-2 & PAC-3)
  - 3rd Air Defense Artillery Brigade (3rd ADAB) (PAC-2 & PAC-3)

Spain

- Spanish Army
  - Regimiento de Artillería antiaérea 73

Sweden

- Swedish Army
  - Air Defence Regiment (Robot 103A (PAC-2 GEM-T) & Robot 103B (PAC-3 MSE)

Sweden decided in competition with Aster 30 SAMP/T to request an offer for the Patriot system in November 2017. In August 2018, an agreement was signed for four units and 12 launchers to form two battalions. No follow-up orders are to be made. The initial cost for the project was estimated at 10 billion SEK. However, the United States has since granted Sweden the option to purchase up to 300 air defense missiles for a maximum value of $3.2 billion. This figure, corresponded to 28 billion SEK as of July 2018. The system, known as Luftvärnssystem 103 (Anti-air system 103) in Sweden, was delivered over the years 2021–2022.

The first Swedish troops were training on the system at Fort Sill in December 2018. The Swedish Defence Materiel Administration accepted the first deliveries in April 2021 and System Integration and Check Out was initiated by Swedish Armed Forces. The system was officially activated with the Swedish Armed forces in November 2021. The final unit was delivered in December 2022.

Taiwan (Republic of China)

- Republic of China Air Force GHQ Missile Command

Ukraine

Ukraine currently has 10 Patriot batteries. Five batteries have been donated by Germany and another three by the United States. Israel and Romania have donated one battery each. In July 2026, Donald Trump proposed granting Ukraine the right to produce Patriot interceptor missiles.

- Ukrainian Air Force
  - 96th Anti-Aircraft Missile Brigade
  - 138th Anti-Aircraft Missile Brigade

United Arab Emirates

- United Arab Emirates Army

In 2014, the United Arab Emirates closed a deal worth nearly $4 billion with Lockheed Martin and Raytheon to buy and operate the latest development of the PAC-3 system, as well as 288 of Lockheed's PAC-3 missiles, and 216 GEM-T missiles. The deal was part of the development of a national defense system to protect the Emirates from air threats. In 2019, the United Arab Emirates Armed Forces purchased 452 Patriot Advanced Capability 3 (PAC-3) Missiles Segment Enhanced (MSE) and related equipment for an estimated cost of $2.728 billion.

United States

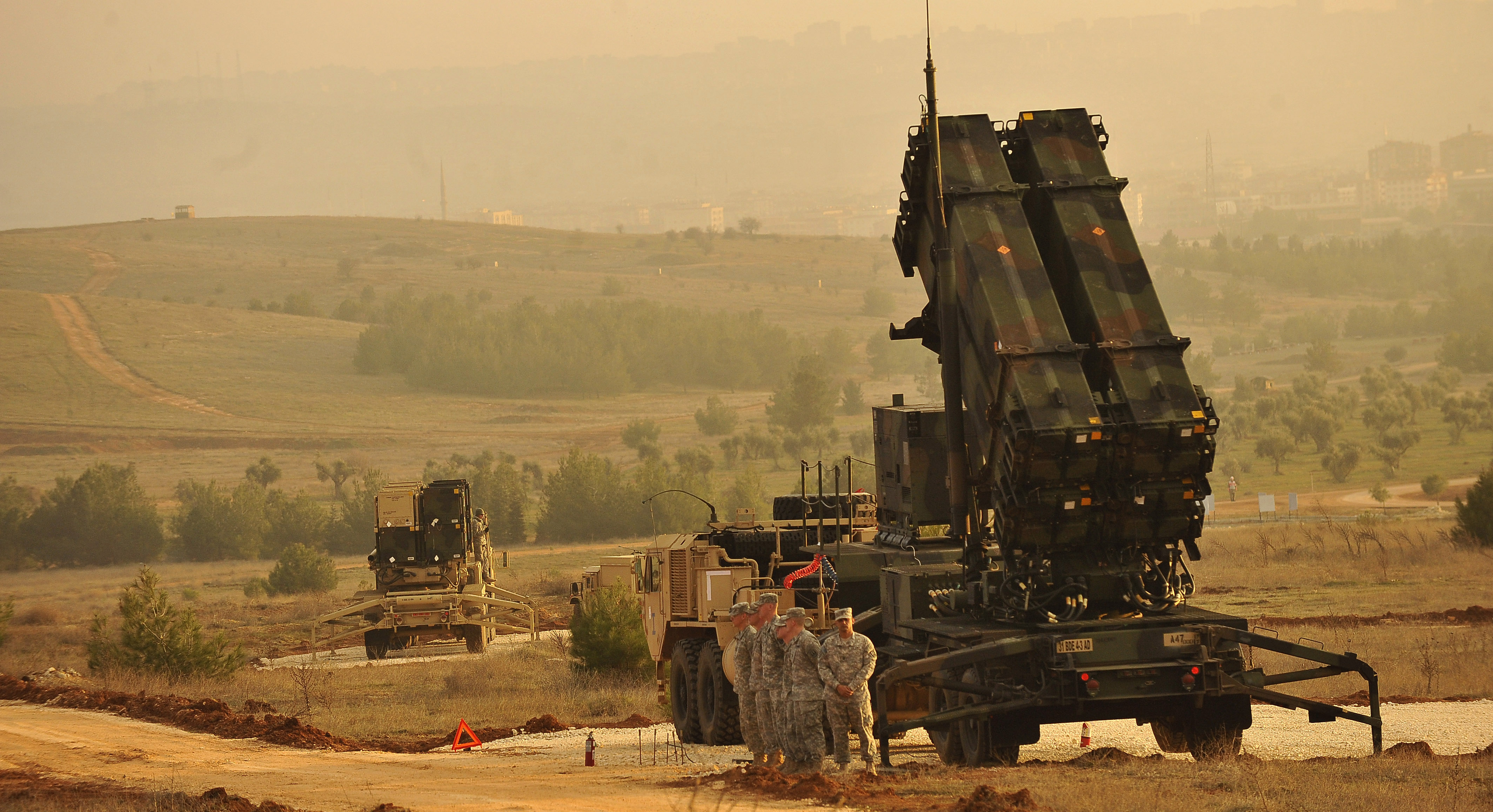
A US Army battery of Patriot PAC-2 and PAC-3 launchers, Operation Active Fence

The US Army operates 1,106 Patriot launchers. In 2023, 480 were in service. It has donated three batteries to Ukraine. The pricing of various missile and radar programs managed by the unit is subject to the Truth in Negotiations Act (TINA), which requires the certification of cost data for sole-source contracts. In 2024, a Department of Justice investigation found that the unit had provided inflated labor and material costs for Patriot missile systems, leading to a major settlement for defective pricing.

- United States Army
  - 11th Air Defense Artillery Brigade (11 ADA BDE)
    - 1st Battalion, 43rd Air Defense Artillery Regiment (1-43 ADA)
    - 2nd Battalion, 43rd Air Defense Artillery Regiment (2-43 ADA)
    - 3rd Battalion, 43rd Air Defense Artillery Regiment (3-43 ADA)
    - 5th Battalion, 52nd Air Defense Artillery Regiment (5-52 ADA)
  - 30th Air Defense Artillery Brigade (30 ADA BDE)
    - 3rd Battalion, 6th Air Defense Artillery Regiment (3-6 ADA)
  - 31st Air Defense Artillery Brigade (31 ADA BDE)
    - 3rd Battalion, 2nd Air Defense Artillery Regiment (3-2 ADA)
    - 4th Battalion, 3rd Air Defense Artillery Regiment (4-3 ADA)
  - 69th Air Defense Artillery Brigade (69 ADA BDE)
    - 4th Battalion, 5th Air Defense Artillery Regiment (4-5 ADA)
    - 1st Battalion, 44th Air Defense Artillery Regiment (1-44 ADA)
    - 1st Battalion, 62nd Air Defense Artillery Regiment (1-62 ADA)
  - 108th Air Defense Artillery Brigade (108 ADA BDE)
    - 1st Battalion, 7th Air Defense Artillery Regiment (1-7 ADA)
    - 3rd Battalion, 4th Air Defense Artillery Regiment (3-4 ADA)
- Units permanently stationed overseas
  - 35th Air Defense Artillery Brigade (35 ADA BDE), South Korea
    - 2nd Battalion, 1st Air Defense Artillery Regiment (2-1 ADA)
    - 6th Battalion, 52nd Air Defense Artillery Regiment (6-52 ADA)
  - 38th Air Defense Artillery Brigade (38 ADA BDE), Japan
    - 1st Battalion, 1st Air Defense Artillery Regiment (1-1 ADA)
  - 52nd Air Defense Artillery Brigade (52 ADA BDE), Germany
    - 5th Battalion, 7th Air Defense Artillery Regiment (5-7 ADA)

=== Future ===
Morocco

- Royal Moroccan Army
  - PAC-3 ordered and to be operated by Royal Moroccan Army.

Switzerland

- Swiss Air Force - Air2030 BODLUV programme
  - 5 batteries selected in 2022, contracted in 2023 for US$1,225,368,567
    - 70 Raytheon MIM-104E GEM-T (PAC-2) missiles
    - 3 TOC-C (Tactical Operation Center Coordination)
    - 5 AN/MSQ-132 TOC-E (Tactical Operation Center Execution)
    - 5 AN/MPQ-65A radars
    - 5 EPP RADAR-V electrical generators for radar
    - 17 M903 launching stations
    - OE-349 Antenna Mast Group (UHF communications array)
  - 72 Lockheed Martin PAC-3 MSE ordered in 2023 for CHF 300 million

=== Former ===
Israel

- Israeli Air Force
  - Israeli Air Defense Command

Operated 8 PAC-2/GEM+ "Yahalom" batteries. Replaced by the David's Sling and Arrow systems in 2024. In January 2025, a US defense official confirmed that about 90 interceptors along with one battery was sent to Ukraine.

== See also ==
- List of medium-range and long-range SAMs
- List of military electronics of the United States
- Comparison of anti-ballistic missile systems – Defense system comparison
- Ground-Based Midcourse Defense – United States anti-ballistic missile system
- Lockheed Martin ALHTK – Defunct military weapons system
- Medium Extended Air Defense System – Air- and missile-defense system
- National Missile Defense – Global missile defense program of the United States
- Terminal High Altitude Area Defense – US ballistic missile defense system
- U.S. Army Aviation and Missile Command – U.S. Army's provider of aviation and missile equipment

International:

- HQ-9 – Mobile based surface-to-air missile/anti-ballistic missile system
- HQ-22 – Chinese air defence system
- Indian Ballistic Missile Defence Programme – Indian military defence system, established 2000
- Khordad 15 (medium-range air defense system)
- Project Kusha (air defence system) – Indian long-range surface-to air missile
- S-300 missile system – Series of Soviet surface-to-air missile systems
- S-350 missile system
- S-400 missile system – Mobile surface-to-air missile air defense
- S-500 missile system – Mobile surface-to-air missile air defense
- Sayyad-2 – Iranian surface-to-air missile family – very similar to American MIM-104 Patriot launchers
