= List of current equipment of the Iraqi Ground Forces =

Military equipment list

The following is a list of equipment currently in use with the Iraqi Ground Forces. For a list of previous equipment, please see List of former equipment of the Iraqi Army.

== Infantry weapons ==
=== Handguns ===
Model	Image	Caliber	Origin	Details
Glock 17		9×19mm Parabellum; 10mm Auto	Austria	Used by ISOF
Smith & Wesson M&P		9×19mm Parabellum	United States	
Tariq		9×19mm Parabellum	Iraq	Manufactured under license as the Tariq. Establishments from 1981 onwards. Production stopped in 2003 and resumed from 2009 onwards. The internal design appears identical to the original pistols.
Zastava CZ 99		9×19mm Parabellum	Serbia	
Beretta 92		9×19mm Parabellum	Italy	Used by ISOF
HS2000		9×19mm Parabellum	Croatia	Used by ISOF

=== Assault and battle rifles ===
Model	Image	Caliber	Origin	Details
M16		5.56×45mm NATO	United States	Used since 2007.
M4 M4A1		5.56×45mm NATO	United States	
Remington R4		5.56×45mm NATO	United States	
Mk 14 Enhanced Battle Rifle		7.62×51mm NATO	United States	Used by ISOF
SIG Sauer SIGM400		5.56×45mm NATO	Germany	Used by ISOF
HS Produkt VHS		5.56×45mm NATO	Croatia	
K2C carbine		5.56×45mm NATO	South Korea	
FB Tantal		5.45×39mm	Poland	10,000 Tantals were sold to Iraq in mid-2000.
AKM		7.62×39mm	Soviet Union	Used by previous Iraqi army. Some captured from the Islamic State. Mostly kept in storage. Used in parades.
Zastava M70		7.62×39mm	Yugoslavia; Iraq	In limited use.

=== Sniper and anti-materiel rifles ===
Model	Image	Caliber	Origin	Details
M24		7.62×51mm NATO	United States	Used by ISOF
Orsis T-5000		7.62×51mm NATO	Russia	Used by ISOF
Barrett M82		7.62×51mm NATO	United States	
AM-50 Sayyad		7.62×51mm NATO	Austria; Iran	
PSG1		7.62×51mm NATO	Germany	
Dragunov		7.62×54mmR	Soviet Union; Iraq	In limited use.
PSL (rifle)		7.62×54mmR	Romania	
Tabuk Sniper Rifle		7.62×39mm	Iraq	

=== Machine guns ===
Model	Image	Caliber	Origin	Details
M249		5.56×45mm NATO	United States	Used by ISOF
M240		7.62×51mm NATO	United States	
MG 3		7.62×51mm NATO	Germany	
RPK		7.62×39mm	Soviet Union; Iraq	Manufactured under license between 1981 and 2003. Kept in storage.
PK machine gun		7.62×54mmR	Soviet Union	In limited use.
M2 Browning		.50 BMG	United States	
M134		7.62×51mm NATO	United States	
DShK		12.7×108mm	Soviet Union	

=== Portable guided missiles ===
Model	Image	Type	Origin	Details
FIM-92 Stinger		Man-portable air-defense system	United States	
BGM-71 TOW		Wire-guided missile	United States	
HOT		Wire-guided missile	France; West Germany	
9M113 Konkurs		Wire-guided missile	Soviet Union	
9M133 Kornet		Laser beam-riding missile	Russia	

== Protective gear ==
Model	Image	Origin	Type	Details
M80		Iraq	Combat helmet	Used by Iraqi Armed Forces from the early 1980s to 2010. Used mostly for training.
MICH		United States	Combat helmet	Used by ISOF
PASGT		United States	Combat helmet	Standard personnel armor.
IOTV		United States	Bulletproof vest	Standard issue in combat and duty personnel. With different versions.

== Vehicles and artillery ==
Name	Image	Origin	Type	In service	Notes
Tanks(1325)
M1A1 Abrams		United States	Main battle tank	487	
T-90S		Russia	Main battle tank	210	According to the SIPRI, Russia has delivered 73 T-90S/SK MBTs in 2018-2019.
T-72M Lion of Babylon		Soviet UnionIraq	Main battle tank	478+	T-72M/M1
T-55		Soviet Union	Main battle tank	150	T-55M/Al-Kafil-1
Armoured recovery
M88 Hercules		United States	Armoured recovery vehicle	35+	M-88A1/2
BREM-1		Soviet Union	Armoured recovery vehicle	180	
VT-55A		Czechoslovakia	Armoured recovery vehicle	150	
WZT-2		Soviet Union/Poland	Armoured recovery vehicle	N/A	
Type-653		China	Armoured recovery vehicle	N/A	

=== Armoured fighting vehicles ===
Name	Image	Origin	Type	In service	Notes
Infantry fighting vehicles(1470)
BMP-3		Russia	Infantry fighting vehicle	300	BMP-3M Variant ordered in 2015 delivered in 2018-2019.
BMP-1		Soviet Union	Infantry fighting vehicle	600	
BTR-4		Ukraine	Infantry fighting vehicle	270	
VN22		China	Infantry fighting vehicle	200	Localized version
BTR-80		Soviet Union; Russia; Poland	Infantry fighting vehicle	100	BTR-80A
Armoured personnel carrier (Tracked)
M113		United States	Armoured personnel carrier	500	M113A2 variant
MT-LB / MT-LBu		Soviet Union	Armoured personnel carrier	≈400	
APC Talha		Pakistan	Armoured personnel carrier	44	In November 2004, the Iraqi Ministry of Defence signed a deal with HIT worth US$31 million in which it ordered 44 Talha APCs, 60 Mohafiz security vehicles and 300 Aahan Armoured Guard Posts making Iraq the first export customer for the Talha.
Protected patrol vehicle
TM-170 Barracuda		West Germany	Armoured personnel carrier	12	
Caiman		United States	MRAP	250	
Goretz-M		Russia	Armoured vehicle	N/A	
Cougar/ILAV		United States	MRAP	1,243	In 2007 an order for 378 was placed,+ 865 ordered by 2011.
International MaxxPro		United States	MRAP	30	
Armoured utility vehicles
Oshkosh M-ATV		United States	MRAP	≈200	Used by ISOF.
Otokar Akrep		Turkey	Infantry mobility vehicle	400	
Mohafiz (vehicle)		Pakistan	Internal security vehicle / Infantry Mobility Vehicle	60	In November 2004, the Iraqi Ministry of Defence signed a deal with HIT worth US$31 million in which it ordered 44 Talha APCs, 60 Mohafiz security vehicles and 300 Aahan Armoured Guard Posts making Iraq the first export customer for the Mohafiz.
M1117		United States	Armoured personnel carrier	324	
Armoured reconnaissance vehicles
BRDM-2		Soviet Union	Reconnaissance vehicle	18	
EE-9 Cascavel		Brazil	Reconnaissance vehicle	35	
Utility vehicles
HMMWV		United States	Light utility vehicle	+10,000	
Promoter DAPC		South Korea	Infantry mobility vehicle	50	Used by ISOF, possible replacement for HMMWV.
Oshkosh M1070		United States	Tank transporter and tractor unit	60	M1070A0
FMTV		United States	Heavy utility truck	≈500	
HEMTT		United States	Heavy utility truck	150	
MTVR		United States	Medium utility truck	270	
Navistar 7000		United States	Armoured personnel carrier	≈300	115 Navistar 7000-MV on order in addition to unknown number in service.
M939		United States	Armoured personnel carrier	≈250	
KrAZ-6322		Ukraine	Armoured personnel carrier	2150	
FV103 Spartan		United Kingdom	Armoured personnel carrier	100	
Saxon		United Kingdom	Armoured personnel carrier	60	
BTR-94		Ukraine	Armoured personnel carrier	50	

=== Rockets and artillery ===
Name	Image	Origin	Type	Quantity	Notes
Self-propelled artillery
Type-83		China	152mm self-propelled howitzer	38+	
M109		United States	155mm self-propelled howitzer	220	M109A1/A2
AMX-GCT		France	155mm self-propelled howitzer	86	
2S1 Gvozdika		Soviet Union	122mm self-propelled howitzer	90	
Towed artillery
M-46/Type-59		Soviet UnionChina	130mm howitzer	+100	
D-20		Soviet Union	152mm howitzer	+100	
Type-83		China	122mm howitzer	50	
M198		United States	155mm howitzer	160	
2A36 Giatsint-B		Soviet Union	152mm howitzer	+200	
Multiple rocket launcher
Astros II MLRS		Iraq Brazil	Multiple rocket launcher	66	Built under license as the Sajil-60
BM-21 Grad		Soviet Union	Multiple rocket launcher	300	
TOS-1		Russia	Multiple rocket launcher	6+	
Type 63		China	Multiple rocket launcher	+200	

=== Anti-aircraft ===
Name	Image	Origin	Type	Quantity	Notes
KM-SAM		South Korea	Anti-aircraft		8 on order
Pantsir-S1		Russia	Anti-aircraft	24	
TWQ-1 Avenger		United States	Anti-aircraft	100	
MIM-23 Hawk		United States	Anti-aircraft	50	XXI variant
Bofors 40 mm		Sweden	Anti-aircraft autocanon	100	Recently refurbished and made operational

=== Radar systems ===
Model	Image	Origin	Type	In service
GM 403		France	Mobile radar	13
GM 200		France	Mobile radar	3
AN/MPQ-64		United States	Mobile radar	Unknown
AN/FPS-117		United States	Mobile radar	Unknown
AN/TPQ-37		United States	Mobile radar	Unknown
Beagle		Germany	Mobile radar	Unknown

== Army aviation ==
These are aircraft in Iraqi Ground Forces command. For other aircraft see List of active aircraft of the Iraqi Air Force page.

Aircraft	Image	Origin	Type	Variant	Quantity	Notes
Combat helicopter
Eurocopter EC725		France	Combat search and rescue		2	12 ordered
Mil Mi-24		Russia	Attack	Mi-35M	23	12 optional order
Mil Mi-28		Russia	Close air support/Anti-armor	Mi-28NE Mi-28UB	17	19 optional order
T129 ATAK		Turkey	Attack helicopter			12 planned
Utility/Transport helicopter
Aerospatiale Gazelle		France	Utility	SA342	4+	
Bell 407		United States	Light utility		40	5 optional order
Eurocopter EC635		Germany	Utility/Light attack		23	
Mil Mi-8/Mil Mi-17		Russia	Transport/Utility		41	
Bell UH-1		United States	Utility	UH-1H	16	
Training/Reconnaissance
Bell 206		United States	Rotorcraft trainer		10	
Bell OH-58		United States	Scout/Rotorcraft trainer	OH-58C	10	
Bell 505		United States	Rotorcraft trainer			15 optional order
Drones
CH-5		China	Unmanned combat aerial vehicle		Unknown	
CH-4		China	Unmanned combat aerial vehicle		12	
RQ-11 Raven		United States	Unmanned aerial vehicle		10	Locally manufactured
N/A		Iraq	Unmanned aerial vehicle		Dozens	Locally manufactured

== See also ==
- Iraqi Aircraft inventory
