= List of former equipment of the Iraqi Ground Forces =

The following is a list of former equipment used by the Iraqi Ground Forces. For a list of current equipment, please see List of current equipment of the Iraqi Ground Forces.

For a list of Former Iraqi Air Force equipment, please see Former Iraqi Air Force equipment.

== Pre-1958 equipment ==
=== Small arms ===
==== Handguns ====
Country of Name	Country of Origin
Webley Revolver	United Kingdom

==== Submachine guns ====
Country of Name	Country of Origin
M1A1 Thompson	United States
Sterling L2A3	United Kingdom

==== Rifles ====
Name	Country of origin
Lee–Enfield	United Kingdom

==== Light machine guns ====
Name	Country of origin
Bren light machine gun	United Kingdom
Lewis gun	United Kingdom

==== Anti-tank rifles ====
Name	Country of origin
Boys anti-tank rifle	United Kingdom

==== Rocket launchers ====
Country of Name	Country of Origin
M20 Super Bazooka	United States

=== Tanks and tankettes ===
Name	Type	Country of origin
L3/35	Tankette	Kingdom of Italy
M.13/40	Medium Tank	Kingdom of Italy
Cruiser A15 Crusader Mk I	Cruiser Tank	United Kingdom
Light Tank Mk VI	Light Tank	United Kingdom
M24 Chaffee	Light Tank	United States
Churchill Mk VII	Infantry Tank	United Kingdom
Centurion Mk 5/1	Main Battle Tank	United Kingdom

=== SPG ===
Name	Country of origin
15 cm sFH 13/1 (Sf) Geschützwagen Lorraine Schlepper (f)	France; Nazi Germany

=== Аrmored cars ===
Name	Country of origin
Vickers Crossley Armoured Car	United Kingdom
Indian Pattern Wheeled Carrier	United Kingdom
Unknown armored car	Kingdom of Iraq
Crossley India Pattern	United Kingdom
Daimler armoured car	United Kingdom
Humber Armoured Car	United Kingdom
Ferret Mk 1/1	United Kingdom

=== Cars ===
Country of Name	Country of Origin
Land Rover Series I LWB	United Kingdom
Dodge Power Wagon W100	United States
Willys M38	United States
DUKW	United States
Austin Champ	United Kingdom

=== Trucks ===
Country of Name	Country of Origin
Chevrolet C15	United States
White/ Corbitt Model 666	United States
AEC Militant Mk.1	United Kingdom

=== Tractors ===
Name	Country of origin
M4 high-speed tractor	United States
Ford FGT	United States
Diamond T-980	United States
Thornycroft Antar MK.2	United Kingdom

=== Engineering vehicles ===
Country of Name	Country of Origin
British made folding boat carrier based on unknown truck	United Kingdom

=== Howitzers ===
Country of Name	Country of Origin
QF 3.7-inch mountain howitzer	United Kingdom
Ordnance QF 18-pounder Mark IV	United Kingdom
Ordnance QF 18-pounder Mk I	United Kingdom
Ordnance QF 18-pounder Mk II	United Kingdom
QF 25-pounder field gun Mk I	United Kingdom
QF 25-pounder field gun Mk II	United Kingdom
Ordnance BL 5.5-inch	United Kingdom
M115 howitzer	United States

=== AA guns ===
Name	Country of origin
Bofors 40 mm gun	United Kingdom

=== Mortars ===
Name	Country of Origin
Ordnance ML 3-inch mortar	United Kingdom

== 1958–2003 equipment ==
=== Small arms ===
==== Handguns ====
Name	Country of Origin	Caliber	Notes
TT-33	Soviet Union	7.62×25mm Tokarev	
Type 51	China	7.62×25mm Tokarev	Chinese copy of the Tokarev TT.
Makarov PM	Soviet Union	9×18mm Makarov	
Beretta M1951	Italy	9×19mm Parabellum	
Tariq pistol	Iraq	9×19mm Parabellum	Licensed copy of the Beretta M1951.
Browning Hi-Power	Belgium	9×19mm Parabellum	
CZ-75	Czechoslovakia	9×19mm Parabellum	

==== Submachine guns ====
Name	Country of Origin	Caliber	Notes
M84	Yugoslavia	.32 ACP	Yugoslav copy of the Škorpion vz. 61 built under license.

==== Assault rifles ====
Name	Country of Origin	Caliber	Notes
AK-47	Soviet Union	7.62×39mm	
AKM	Soviet Union	7.62×39mm	
MPi-KMS-72	East Germany	7.62×39mm	
AK-63	Hungary	7.62×39mm	
Type 56	China	7.62×39mm	
vz. 58	Czechoslovakia	7.62×39mm	
PM md. 63/65	Romania	7.62×39mm	
Zastava M70	Yugoslavia	7.62×39mm	M70AB folding stock variant used.

==== Rifles ====
Name	Country of origin	Caliber	Notes
Baghdad carbine	Egypt Iraq	7.62×39mm	
SKS	Soviet Union	7.62×39mm	
Zastava M59/66	Yugoslavia	7.62×39mm	

==== Machine guns ====
Name	Country of origin	Type	Caliber	Notes
RPD	Soviet Union	Light machine gun	7.62×39mm	
RPK	Soviet Union	Light machine gun	7.62×39mm	
Zastava M72	Yugoslavia	Light machine gun	7.62×39mm	
Al-Quds	Iraq	Light machine gun	7.62×39mm	Locally produced copy of the Zastava M72.
SG-43 Goryunov	Soviet Union	Medium machine gun	7.62×54mmR	SGM variant used.
PK machine gun	Soviet Union	General-purpose machine gun	7.62×54mmR	
FN MAG	Belgium	General-purpose machine gun	7.62×51mm NATO	
AA-52	France	General-purpose machine gun	7.62×51mm NATO	
DShK	Soviet Union	Heavy machine gun	12.7×108mm	DShK 1938 and 38/46 models used.
KPV	Soviet Union	Heavy machine gun	14.5×114mm	

==== Sniper rifles ====
Name	Country of Origin	Caliber	Notes
Dragunov SVD	Soviet Union	7.62×54mmR	
Al-Kadisa	Iraq	7.62×54mmR	Locally produced copy of the SVD.
Tabuk	Iraq	7.62×39mm	Licensed copy of the Zastava M70B1.

==== Hand grenades ====
Name	Country of Origin	Type	Notes
RG-42	Soviet Union	Fragmentation grenade	
F1	Soviet Union	Fragmentation grenade	
RGD-5	Soviet Union	Fragmentation grenade	
RGO-78	Bulgaria	Fragmentation grenade	Bulgarian copy of the RGD-5.
RKG-3	Soviet Union	Anti-tank grenade	
No. 2 Grenade	Egypt	Offensive grenade	Egyptian copy of the Czechoslovak RG-4 grenade.

==== Rocket launchers ====
Name	Country of Origin	Notes
RPG-7	Soviet Union	
Al-Nassira	Iraq	Locally produced copy of the RPG-7.

==== Grenade launchers ====
Name	Country of origin
GP-25	Soviet Union
AGS-17	Soviet Union

==== Recoilless guns ====
Name	Country of origin
SPG-9	Soviet Union
M40A1	United States

==== Anti-tank missiles ====
Name	Country of origin	Type	Notes
3M6 Shmel	Soviet Union	MCLOS	
9M17 Fleyta	Soviet Union	MCLOS	
9M14 Malyutka	Soviet Union	MCLOS	
9K111 Fagot	Soviet Union	SACLOS	
HOT ATGM	France; West Germany	SACLOS	
MILAN	France; West Germany	SACLOS	
SS.11	France	MCLOS	
M47 Dragon	United States	SACLOS	Captured from Iran.

==== Man-portable air-defense systems ====
Name	Country of origin
9K32 Strela-2	Soviet Union
9K34 Strela-3	Soviet Union
9K310 Igla-1	Soviet Union
HN-5A	China

=== Mortars ===
Name	Country of origin	Caliber	Notes
M70 commando mortar	Yugoslavia	60 mm	
Al-Jaleel 60 mm Commando Mortar	Iraq	60 mm	Locally produced copy of the M70.
Al-Jaleel 60 mm	Iraq	60 mm	
M-37M	Soviet Union	82 mm	
Al-Jaleel 82 mm	Iraq	82 mm	
120-PM-43 mortar	Soviet Union	120 mm	
Al-Jaleel 120mm	Iraq	120 mm	
M1943	Soviet Union	160 mm	
M-240	Soviet Union	240 mm	

=== Towed artillery ===
Name	Country of origin	Number	Caliber	Type	Notes
M116 howitzer	United States		75 mm	Mountain gun	
D-44	Soviet Union		85 mm	Field gun	
Ordnance QF 25-pounder	United Kingdom		88 mm	Gun-howitzer	
OTO Melara Mod 56	Italy		105 mm	Mountain gun	
M-56 Howitzer	Yugoslavia		105 mm	Howitzer	
D-74	Soviet Union		122 mm	Field gun	
D-30	Soviet Union	861	122 mm	Howitzer	
M-30	Soviet Union	30	122 mm	Field gun	
M-46	Soviet Union	772	130 mm	Field gun	
Type 56-I	China		130 mm	Field gun	Chinese copy of the M-46.
M1937	Soviet Union	50	152 mm	Gun-howitzer	
D-1	Soviet Union	250	152 mm	Howitzer	
2A36 Giatsint-B	Soviet Union	180	152 mm	Field gun	
Type 83	China	50	152 mm	Howitzer	
G5	South Africa	100	155 mm	Howitzer	
GHN-45	Canada	200	155 mm	Howitzer	Illegally transferred to Iraq via Jordan.
M114	United States		155 mm	Howitzer	Captured from Iran.
Type 63	China	100	107 mm	Multiple rocket launcher	

=== Anti-tank guns ===
Name	Country of origin	Caliber	Notes
D-48	Soviet Union	85 mm	
MT-12	Soviet Union	100 mm	100 delivered by the Soviet Union.
M1977	Romania	100 mm	

=== Anti-aircraft artillery ===
Name	Country of origin	Number	Caliber	Type	Notes
ZPU	Soviet Union		14.5×114mm	Towed anti-aircraft gun	ZPU-1, ZPU-2, and ZPU-4 variants used.
Zastava M55	Yugoslavia		20 mm	Towed anti-aircraft gun	M75 variant also used.
ZU-23-2	Soviet Union		23 mm	Towed anti-aircraft gun	
Oerlikon GDF	Switzerland		35 mm	Towed anti-aircraft gun	Captured from Kuwait, used with the Skyguard fire control system.
61-K	Soviet Union; China	250	37 mm	Towed anti-aircraft gun	Chinese Type 55 also used.
AZP S-60	Soviet Union; China	500	57 mm	Towed anti-aircraft gun	Chinese Type 59 also used.
52-K	Soviet Union	200	85 mm	Towed anti-aircraft gun	Used with the Fire Can radar.
KS-19	Soviet Union	200	100 mm	Towed anti-aircraft gun	
KS-30	Soviet Union	200	130 mm	Towed anti-aircraft gun	
ZSU-23-4	Soviet Union	200+	23 mm	Self-propelled anti-aircraft gun	
M53/59 Praga	Czechoslovakia		30 mm	Self-propelled anti-aircraft gun	
ZSU-57-2	Soviet Union	100+	57 mm	Self-propelled anti-aircraft gun	

=== Tanks ===
Name	Picture	Country of origin	Type	Number	Variant	Notes
PT-76		Soviet Union	Light tank	100		
T-34		Soviet Union	Medium tank	175	T-34/85M	
T-54		Soviet Union	Main battle tank	300	T-54A	
T-55		Soviet Union; Poland; Czechoslovakia	Main battle tank	1,400	T-55M	
T-55 Enigma		Iraq	Main battle tank	8		Locally upgraded T-55. Designated as the Al-Najm or Al-Faw.
TR-580		Romania	Main battle tank	150		Transferred by Egypt.
Type 59 tank		China	Main battle tank	1,000		
Type 69 tank		China	Main battle tank	1,500	Type 69-I; Type 69-II	
Type 69-II Enigma		Iraq	Main battle tank	1		Locally upgraded Type 69-II, designated the Al-Najm or Al-Faw.
T-62		Soviet Union; Czechoslovakia	Main battle tank	2,850		
T-72M T-72M1		Soviet Union; Poland; Czechoslovakia	Main battle tank	550 1,038		
Lion of Babylon (tank)		Iraq	Main battle tank	500		Locally assembled T-72M1 using Polish knock-down kits, none were built according to Polish officials.
M-84		Yugoslavia	Main battle tank	6+	M-84AB	Captured from Kuwait.
Chieftain		United Kingdom	Main battle tank	75	Mk 3 Mk 5	Captured from Iran, most were given to Jordan.
M47 Patton		United States	Main battle tank	30	M47M	Captured from Iran, most were given to Jordan.
M48 Patton		United States	Main battle tank	20	M48A5	Captured from Iran, remaining scrapped after the war.
M60 tank		United States	Main battle tank	6+	M60A1	Captured from Iran, some were given to Jordan.

=== Tank destroyers ===
Name	Country of origin	Number	Notes
SU-100	Soviet Union	250	
9P133	Soviet Union	100	Armed with Sagger missiles.
9P148	Soviet Union		Armed with Konkurs missiles.
VCR/TH	France	100	Armed with HOT missiles.

=== Reconnaissance vehicles ===
Name	Country of origin	Type	Number	Variant	Notes
BRDM-2	Soviet Union	Scout car	250		
D-442 FUG	Hungary	Scout car	200	D-944 PSzH	
MOWAG Roland	Switzerland	Scout car			
EE-3 Jararaca	Brazil	Scout car	300		
Panhard AML	France	Armored car	300	AML-60; AML-90	
Panhard ERC	France	Armored car	50	ERC-90 Sagaie	
EE-9 Cascavel	Brazil	Armored car	200		

=== Armoured fighting vehicles ===
Name	Country of origin	Type	Number	Variant	Notes
BMP-1	Soviet Union; Czechoslovakia	Infantry fighting vehicle	1,000	BVP-1	
Saddam II	Iraq	Infantry fighting vehicle			Locally upgraded BMP-1, used by Republican Guard units.
BMP-2	Soviet Union; Czechoslovakia	Infantry fighting vehicle	200	BVP-2	
BMD-1	Soviet Union	Infantry fighting vehicle	25		
AMX-10P	France	Infantry fighting vehicle	45		Includes AMX-10 VLA and AMX-10 VFA command post versions.
BTR-152	Soviet Union	Armoured personnel carrier	200		
BTR-50	Soviet Union	Armoured personnel carrier	250		
BTR-60	Soviet Union	Armoured personnel carrier	250	BTR-60PB	
MT-LB	Soviet Union; Poland	Armoured personnel carrier	750		Some were modified into mortar carriers.
OT-62 TOPAS	Czechoslovakia; Poland	Armoured personnel carrier	100	OT-62A	
OT-64 SKOT	Czechoslovakia; Poland	Armoured personnel carrier	200	OT-64A	
M113	United States	Armoured personnel carrier		M113A1	Captured from Iran, some were given to Jordan.
Panhard M3	France	Armoured personnel carrier	200	M3 VTT; M3 VAT	Includes 5 M3 VAT armoured recovery vehicles.
EE-11 Urutu	Brazil	Armoured personnel carrier	200		
Type 63	China	Armoured personnel carrier	650	Type YW701	Includes some command post vehicles.
Walid	Egypt	Armoured personnel carrier	100		Status uncertain.

=== Self-propelled artillery ===
Name	Country of origin	Type	Number	Caliber	Variant	Notes
2S1 Gvozdika	Soviet Union	Self-propelled gun	150	122 mm		
2S3 Akatsiya	Soviet Union	Self-propelled gun	150	152 mm		
AMX 30 AuF1	France	Self-propelled gun	85	155 mm	CGT	
M109 howitzer	United States	Self-propelled gun		155 mm	M109A1; M109A2	Captured from Iran and Kuwait.
M-1978 Koksan	North Korea	Self-propelled gun		170 mm		Captured from Iran.
BM-21 Grad	Soviet Union; Egypt	Multiple rocket launcher	1,060	122 mm	BM-21; RL-21	
Katyusha	Soviet Union	Multiple rocket launcher		132 mm	BM-13-16	
ASTROS II	Brazil; Iraq	Multiple rocket launcher	67-260	127 mm 180 mm 300 mm	SS-40; SS-60; Sajeel	Produced under license as the Sajeel.
M-87 Orkan	Yugoslavia	Multiple rocket launcher	2	262 mm		

=== Engineering vehicles ===
Name	Country of origin	Type	Notes
T-54/55 ARV	Soviet Union	Armoured recovery vehicle	
Type 653	China	Armoured recovery vehicle	
Chieftain ARV	United Kingdom	Armoured recovery vehicle	Captured from Iran.
Engesa E-11	Brazil	Repair and recovery vehicle	
BAT-M	Soviet Union	Military engineering vehicle	
MDK	Soviet Union	Excavator	
TMK-2	Soviet Union	Trencher	
IMR	Soviet Union	Obstacle clearing vehicle	Based on the T-55 tank chassis.
KMT-4/6	Soviet Union	Mine plow	One KMT-6 was assigned per tank platoon, depending on supplies.
KMT-5	Soviet Union	Mine roller	One KMT-5 was assigned per tank company, depending on supplies.
UR-77	Soviet Union	Mine-clearing line charge	
MTU-20	Soviet Union	Bridgelayer	
MT-55	Czechoslovakia	Bridgelayer	Used by armored units.
BLG-60	East Germany	Bridgelayer	24+ in service in 1991.
TMM	Soviet Union	Pontoon bridge	
PMP	Soviet Union	Pontoon bridge	
GSP	Soviet Union	Amphibious ferry	
PTS	Soviet Union	Amphibious transport	

=== Ground surveillance radars ===
Name	Country of origin
SNAR-2	China
SNAR-10	Soviet Union

=== Tactical ballistic missiles based on SCUD and Luna ===
Country of Name	Country of Origin
FROG-7	Soviet Union
Al-Raad (mod. 9M21 rocket)	Ba'athist Iraq
Scud-B	Soviet Union
Al-Hussein	Ba'athist Iraq
Al Hijarah	Ba'athist Iraq
Al Abbas	Ba'athist Iraq
Al-Tammuz	Ba'athist Iraq
Al-Abid	Ba'athist Iraq

=== Conversion rocket 5Я23, 5В27Д, 2К12, Р-15/HY-2 to surface to surface missiles ===
Name	Country of origin	Description
Al Fahd 300	Ba'athist Iraq	Conversions of the S-75
Al Fahd 500	Ba'athist Iraq	Conversions of the S-75, did not go operational
Al-Barq	Ba'athist Iraq	Modification of S-125
Al-Kasir	Ba'athist Iraq	Modification of 2K12
Modified Р-15/HY-2	Ba'athist Iraq	for use as surface to surface missiles

=== Iraqi liquid-propellant ballistic missiles ===
Name	Country of origin
Ababeel-100	Ba'athist Iraq
Al-Samoud	Ba'athist Iraq
Al-Samoud 2	Ba'athist Iraq

=== Iraqi solid-propellant ballistic missiles ===
Name	Country of origin
BADR-2000	Ba'athist Iraq
Ababil-100	Ba'athist Iraq

=== Anti-ship missile ===
Name	Country of origin
HY-2	China
P-15	Soviet Union

=== Radar systems ===
Name	Country of origin
P-12	Soviet Union
P-14	Soviet Union
P-15	Soviet Union
P-18	Soviet Union
P-19	Soviet Union
P-37	Soviet Union
P-40	Soviet Union
ПРВ-11	Soviet Union
ПРВ-16Б	Soviet Union
РПК-1 ВАЗА	Soviet Union
СНР-75M	Soviet Union
СНР-125M	Soviet Union
1S91	Soviet Union
РСБН-4Н	Soviet Union
Panhard M3 VSB	France
Type-403	China
Type-572	China

=== Light utility vehicles ===
Name	Country of origin
Land Rover	United Kingdom
GAZ-69	Soviet Union
UAZ-469B	Soviet Union

=== Trucks ===
Country of Name	Country of origin
GAZ-63	Soviet Union
GAZ-66	Soviet Union
MAZ-543	Soviet Union
Ural-375D	Soviet Union
ZIL-157	Soviet Union
ZIL-135	Soviet Union
IFA W50	East Germany
IFA L60	East Germany
Unimog	West Germany
Scania	Sweden
Berliet GBC 8KT	France

== Bibliography ==
- Cullen, Tony; Foss, Christopher F., eds. (1 March 1992). Jane's Land-based Air Defence 1992-93 (5 ed.). Jane's Information Group. ISBN 978-0-7106-0979-3.
- Gander, Terry J.; Cutshaw, Charles Q., eds. (1 February 2002). Jane's Infantry Weapons, 2002-2003 (28th ed.). Jane's Information Group. ISBN 978-0-7106-2434-5.
- Foss, Christopher F., ed. (1991). Jane's Military Vehicles and Logistics 1991-92. Jane's Information Group. ISBN 978-0-7106-0950-2.
- Hogg, Ian V., ed. (1 January 1988). Jane's Infantry Weapons, 1988-89. Jane's Information Group. ISBN 978-0-7106-0857-4.
- International Institute for Strategic Studies (1989). The military balance, 1989-1990. London: Brassey's. ISBN 978-0080375694.
- McNab, Chris (20 January 2022). Armies of the Iran–Iraq War 1980–88. Bloomsbury Publishing. ISBN 978-1-4728-4558-0.
- National Training Center (1 January 1991). The Iraqi Army: Organization and Tactics. Paladin Press. ISBN 978-0-87364-632-1.
- Tucker, Spencer C. (20 August 2014). Persian Gulf War Encyclopedia: A Political, Social, and Military History. Bloomsbury Publishing USA. ISBN 978-1-61069-416-2.
- U.S. Army Intelligence and Threat Analysis Center (1991). How They Fight Desert Shield: Order of Battle Handbook : Friendly Forces. U.S. Army Intelligence and Threat Analysis Center.
- Marine Corps Intelligence Activity (1998). Iraq Country Handbook (PDF). U.S. Government Printing Office. Archived from the original (PDF) on 28 May 2005.
- Zaloga, Steven J. (15 March 2011). M1 Abrams vs T-72 Ural: Operation Desert Storm 1991. Bloomsbury Publishing. p. 24. ISBN 978-1-84908-091-0.
- Zaloga, Steven J. (26 October 2023). Tanks at the Iron Curtain 1975–90: The ultimate generation of Cold War heavy armor. Bloomsbury Publishing. pp. 84–85. ISBN 978-1-4728-5382-0.
