= Ababil-100 =

Iraqi short-range ballistic missile

Ababil-100/Al Fat'h
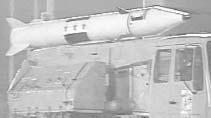
- An al-Fat'h missile
- Type: Short-range ballistic missile
- Place of origin: Iraq

Service history
- In service: 2003
- Wars: Iraq War

Production history
- Variants: Guided version Unguided version

Specifications
- Mass: 1200 kg
- Length: 6.7 m
- Diameter: 0.5 m 1.4 m aft fin assembly
- Payload capacity: 260-300 kg HE; Guided version:HE; Unguided version:HE and submunition
- Propellant: 828 kgsolid propellant Composition: 70% AP; 14% Aluminium powder 11-12% HTPB; 3.5% DIO; 1% Ferric Oxide; 1% TDI; 0.35% MAPO
- Operational range: >150 km
- Guidance system: Unguided version:Fin stabilized Guided version:Inertial guidance

The Ababil-100 or al-Fat'h or al-Fatah was an Iraqi single stage solid-propelled short-range ballistic missile whose development started around 1991 and was tested from 2000 to 2002. Its launcher was derived from the Ababil-50 MLRS.

== Development ==
During August 1991 Iraq started a program to develop the J-1 SSMs based on the S-75 Dvina SAM. Structural similarities would subsequently be observed between the Fahad missiles that were released later and the J-1 missiles. Iraq would then commence another program to develop a missile that could deliver a 300 kg payload with a range of 150 km and a CEP of 150 m for guided Al-Fat'h and 750 m for unguided Al-Fat'h. By 1994 however the guided missiles programs would split and the solid-propellant one would retain its name of Ababil-100. The liquid propelled version would later become the Al-Samoud. The Ababil-100 would inherit many properties from the Ababil-50 MLRS, developed in collaboration with Yugoslavia during the 1980s. Iraq had lacked the required material for the motor case as well as the airframe and thus encountered difficulties in forming and aligning cylindrical shapes required for motor cases resulting in decreased accuracy. Iraq also lacked mixers and bowls required for mixing the propellant as they had already been used for the Badr-2000 cruise missile project and thus frequency of motor accidents increased. Iraq had reportedly imported gyroscopes and accelerometers from Belarus for its guided version, it was estimated that the Inertial guidance system for the guided version would allow the missile to achieve a CEP of 150 m at 150 km range.

== Characteristics ==
The Al Fat'h was a solid-propellant ballistic missile having a length of 6.7 m and a diameter of 0.5 m without, and 1.4 m with fins. It weighed 1200 kg, utilized a motor weighing 770–856 kg and could carry two types of warhead: a 260–300 kg unitary warhead, containing 160–170 kg of explosive, and a cluster warhead. In the words of a UN inspector it was a "Badr-2000 Junior". The airframe was made of 4 mm thick 30CrMoV9 steel sheet. The Ababil-100 launcher was an SM-90 launcher from the S-75 Dvina surface-to-air missile, mounted on the same chassis as the M-87 Orkan multiple rocket launcher, known in Iraq as Ababil-50. The unguided version of the Ababil-100 was simply fin stabilized. However, the guided version would use a complex system of actuators and canards, with an imported inertial guidance system. While the HE warhead of this missile was the same as that used in the Al-Samoud 2, the cluster warhead was filled with 850-900 KB-1 submunitions, which were also used in Ababil-50 rockets, and triggered by a barometric fuze. The submunitions would be dispersed at a height of 1.5–2 km, which was found to be too low. Due to the 2003 invasion of Iraq, the cluster warhead never was developed to a fully satisfactory standard. The missile's range was greater than 150 km. The Al-Fat'h system had a high failure rate with up to 30% of the missiles failing upon launch, and several suffered in-flight disintegrations.

== Operational history ==
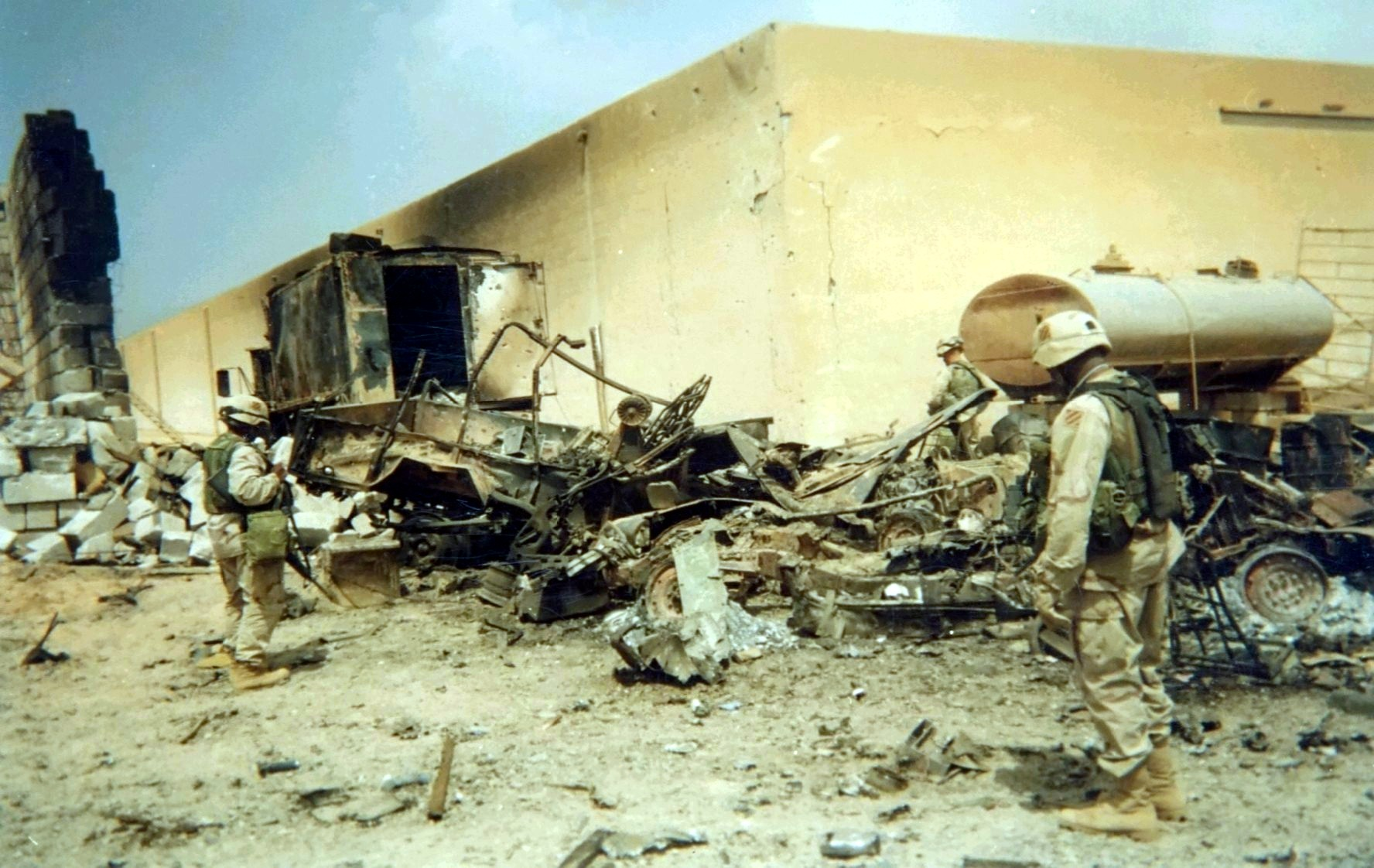
Aftermath of the Ababil-100 missile attack on 7 April

Two guided test flights of the Ababil-100 were conducted, one with roll control and the other with pitch control. As of March 2003, a test with the full control system was only weeks away, but the invasion put an end to the project. 50 individual test firings took place between 2000 and 2002, of which 17 were static motor tests and 33 were flight tests. The unguided version failed to achieve the desired CEP of 750 m. During one of the early tests, the missile demonstrated a range of 161 km. During the 2003 invasion of Iraq, between 12 and 16 of these missiles were fired.

The Operational Center of the 2nd Brigade, US 3rd Infantry Division, was struck by an Ababil-100 missile on April 7, while the Brigade's main force was conducting an incursion 15 km north, well inside Baghdad. Three soldiers and two foreign reporters were killed in the blast. Another 14 soldiers were injured, and 22 vehicles destroyed or seriously damaged, most of them Humvees. The Ababil-100 was apparently fired by the Iraqi army from the town of Hilla, some 100 kilometres (62 mi) to the south. The US air defenses were unable to detect and track the missile because its radar was oriented to the north.

== See also ==
- List of missiles
- Al Husayn
