= Hamza 6x6 =

- Type: Armored vehicle
- Place of origin: Pakistan

Production history
- Designer: Cavalier Group
- Designed: 2017
- Manufacturer: Heavy Industries Taxila
- Developed from: Hamza 8x8

Specifications
- Mass: 19,500 kg (43,000 lb)
- Length: 7.6 m (300 in)
- Width: 2.55 m (100 in)
- Height: 2.65 m (104 in)
- Crew: 2
- Passengers: 10
- Armor: B7 (upto level 5 STANAG 4569) protection
- Engine: Caterpillar C9 or Cummins ISM 500
- Drive: 6x6 8x8
- Transmission: Caterpillar CX28
- Ground clearance: 400 mm (16 in)
- Operational range: ~ 500 km (310 mi)
- Maximum speed: 105 km/h (65 mph)

The Hamza 6x6 MRAP is an armored fighting vehicle designed by Cavalier Group, Pakistan. It is developed from the Hamza 8x8 MRAP and features a V-shaped armored hull design.

== Overview ==
The Hamza 6x6 is a 6-wheeled version of Cavalier Group's previous Hamza 8x8 MCV. It was first revealed during the BIDEC-2017 defence expo at Manama and was reportedly developed for the Pakistan Army. It can carry up to 13 fully equipped soldiers with provision to mount an RCWS fitted with either a heavy machine gun or up to 30mm auto-cannons.

== Operational history ==
There hasn't been any reported deployment of Hamza in any active combat zone inside or outside Pakistan. On 25 June 2026, Russian drone struck a Pakistani made Hamza 6x6 as well as 5 Ukrainian rifleman. This strike involved a Mona 2 drone that has range of over 50 km. Source :https://m.youtube.com/watch?v=HNR_IM5zIeg&pp=iggCQAE%3D (13:50)

== Versions ==
- Hamza 6x6 MCV - Normal variant
- Hamza Medical Support - MEDEVAC version

== See also ==
- APC Talha
- Burraq MRAP vehicle
- Mohafiz
- List of military equipment manufactured in Pakistan
