= JERRV =

Vehicles used by United States military engineers and Explosive Ordnance Disposal

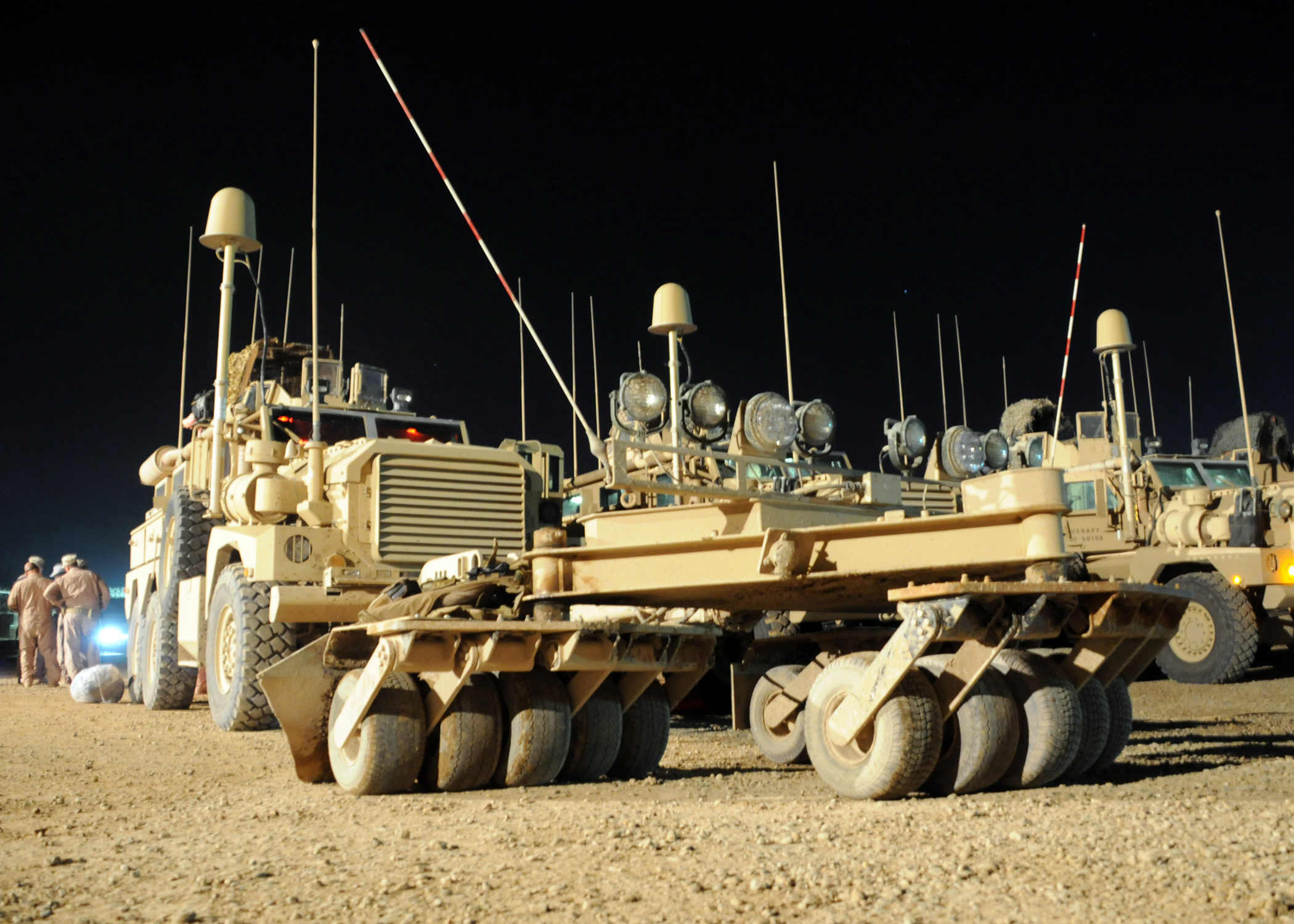
- Cougar type JERRVs in Iraq.

Specifications
- Mass: 14+ tons

A JERRV (Joint EOD Rapid Response Vehicle) is any vehicle that United States Explosive Ordnance Disposal (EOD) units use in war zones such as Iraq.

== EOD application ==
These vehicles are used to safely transport EOD operators, supplies, and equipment, including remotely controlled robots (TALON and PackBot), bomb suits, and explosives. JERRVs are more resistant to the effects of landmines, improvised explosive devices (IEDs), and small arms than soft armored vehicles like Humvees. The JERRV is designed to deflect blasts. They are in some ways like heavier versions of armored cars.

=== Development ===
The JERRV was the natural follow-on to the earlier USMC-directed purchase of some 30 Hardened Engineer Vehicles (HEV). HEV was an urgent UNS program which resulted in an order being placed with Technical Solutions Group (TSG) in Ladson in April 2004. The original HEV requirement document (written on less than a single side of paper) called for some quite specific characteristics which were a major factor in the design of a new vehicle which was called 'Cougar' only to provide a degree of continuity for the user community. The new Cougar was designated Cougar H to differentiate it from the earlier of lightweight and non-military vehicle which had been imported from South Africa by TSG.

The designer was a British ex-army officer who had been asked to help out TSG in previous years and who offered to design a new vehicle when the USMC approached the company with their requirement. His own experiences, as well as a desire to distance TSG from its former South African partners, led to a policy from the outset of creating a new vehicle which would address many of the deficiencies of the older designs as well as to meet first world standards of protection, performance and sustainability. The design team was small - as was the USMC purchasing team - and consisted of the designer plus two other engineers and an automotive supply engineer who specified and purchase the running gear from Peterbilt dealer Rush Crane.

At the time, a few of the old South African designers tried to get involved and persuade TSG (led at that time by Mike Watts), to force the designer to abandon many of the new features. Watts' main contribution to the development of the modern mine protected vehicle (and one which should not be overlooked) was perhaps that he resisted all such pressures and kept these people away from the design team. In order to control the public utterances of some of the main critics, consultancies were awarded by TSG which allowed a degree of commercial confidentiality to be imposed.

Major differences from the older designs included a vertical hull side to increase internal volume, a full-length bottom plate to increase strength and to provide blast and ballistic protection for the engine, full US-specification engine, cooling, power-train etc., sufficient payload to provide ballistic-protection upgrades and so on. Ergonomics were based upon first-world standards as were protection levels and automotive specifications (earlier South Africa designs paid scant regard for these, applying their own local standards which caused some problems when operated by NATO countries).

During the design and construction of the first vehicle, considerable use was made of the carpentry team who worked closely with the design team and frequently led the whole process. They constructed many items in plywood and the engineering team measured the mock-ups and drew them in CAD.

At the same time as the main 4x4 version was being developed, the designer pressed the need for a 6x6 version to reduce ground pressures and axle loads; other versions which were designed and mocked up in wood were a flatbed variant (intended to meet the USMC requirement for a lightweight prime mover system capable of pulling a 155mm howitzer and carrying the crew plus ammunition), an ambulance and a command vehicle. The first HEV was delivered to the USMC in Sep/Oct 2004, less than six months after contract award - at which time the design was still a couple of sketches on a pad.

By September 2004, the US Army had shown interest in Cougar and sent its IED/EOD experts to Charleston, to talk to the design team. The designer agreed to modify the vehicle to make better use of in-service equipment and changed the engine to the military version of the CAT C-7 2136 - increasing from 300 hp to 330 hp and making its electrical system 24 volt. Based upon these assurances, the Army decided to combine with the USMC and order the Joint EOD Rapid Response Vehicle.

== See also ==
- MRAP (armored vehicle)
