= Burraq MRAP vehicle =

- Type: Mine-Resistant Ambush Protected (MRAP) Vehicle
- Place of origin: Pakistan

Service history
- In service: None (cancelled)

Production history
- Designer: Heavy Industries Taxila
- Designed: 2009-2013
- Manufacturer: Heavy Industries Taxila
- Produced: 2010-2013

Specifications
- Mass: 8-10 tonnes
- Crew: 2 (commander, driver) +10 (passengers)
- Armour: B7 Plus protection against 12.7 mm bullets fired from a distance of 200; IED Protection (up to 10 kg)
- Main armament: .50-caliber heavy machine gun
- Secondary armament: 4 smoke grenades(2 front, 2 rear)
- Engine: Isuzu NPS-75; 150 hp (110 kW)
- Power/weight: 15-18 hp / tonne
- Transmission: Manual (5Fwd 1 Rev); Automatic (Optional)
- Suspension: Hydraulic dampers Leaf springs with telescopic shock absorbers
- Ground clearance: 0.21 m (0.68 ft)
- Fuel capacity: 100 Liters

Burraq (Urdu: براق) was a Mine-Resistant Ambush Protected (MRAP) Vehicle that was developed by Heavy Industries Taxila (HIT) of Pakistan. It was a 4x4 Protected vehicle based on the chassis of the Isuzu NPS-75 commercial truck so as to reduce the cost and facilitate the delivery of spare parts.

It was supposed to provide both protection and mobility to Pakistani soldiers during patrols in contested areas during counterinsurgency operations.

== Development ==
Heavy Industries Taxila (HIT) commenced the development of the Burraq MRAP in 2009 to meet Pakistan Army's requirement for cheaper Mine Resistant Ambush Protected Vehicle's as lack of financial resources hampered its plans to acquire protected vehicles from United States, Germany and Turkey.

The Burraq was first seen on Pakistan state media briefly in February 2010.

In June 2011, International Defence Review reported that five prototypes / pre-production models of the Burraq MRAP were completed for trails & development work by Heavy Industries Taxila.

On 19 March 2013, Heavy Industries Taxila (HIT) announced that its Burraq MRAP Vehicle was nearing the end of its prototype phase and would be unveiled in next three to four months.

In October 2013, a spokesman of Heavy Industries Taxila said, “Burraq is on hold,” but gave no reason.

== Design ==
=== Armament ===
The Burraq MRAP Vehicle is armed with a remote controlled .50-caliber heavy machine gun. It also has 4 smoke grenades (2 at front, 2 at rear) used to create smoke screens or to provide opportunity for movement over ground covered by fire.

=== Mobility ===
The Burraq MRAP is powered by an Isuzu NPS-75 engine delivering 150 horsepower (110 kW). The Isuzu NPS-75 engine originally drives a manual transmission with an option of automatic transmission also. Capable of manual and automatic power-shifting, the transmission has 5 forward and 1 reverse speed(s).

The suspension consists of hydraulic dampers and leaf springs with telescopic shock absorbers, which provide a stable firing platform while the vehicle is moving at speed over rough terrain particularly in North-West Pakistan.

The vehicle weighs around 8−10 tonnes and has a power-to-weight ratio of 15-18 hp/tonne.

=== Protection ===
- Protection against IED's: The Burraq MRAP Vehicle can withstand IED blasts of up to 10 kg. It uses a V-shaped hull & raised crew compartment to increase vehicle & crew survivability by deflecting an upward directed blast from an IED (or landmine) away from the vehicle. The occupants sit on blast mitigating seats.
- Protection against bullets up to 12.7 mm caliber: The troops compartment of the Burraq MRAP Vehicle provides B7 Plus Protection against 12.7 mm caliber rounds fired from a distance of 200 m. It can be fitted with add-on armor to withstand 14.5 mm caliber rounds.
- Protection against RPGs: The armor of the Burraq MRAP cannot withstand hits from Rocket Propelled Grenades, particularly the RPG-7. However, it can be fitted with add-on armor or bar/slat armor to withstand RPG hits.

== Carrying Capacity ==
The Burraq MRAP can carry 12 passengers including a crew of two (Commander, driver).

It can also be used to transport military supplies to areas having rough terrain.

== Export ==
Pakistan wants to offer the Burraq MRAP vehicle for export, apparently hoping to gain market share based on low price.

== See also ==
- Heavy Industries Taxila
- Mine-Resistant Ambush Protected Vehicle
- Armoured personnel carrier
- Mohafiz Internal Security Vehicle – (Pakistan)
- Hamza 6x6 MRAP – (Pakistan)
- Talha Armoured Personnel Carrier – (Pakistan)
