= Cougar (MRAP) =

Mine-resistant infantry mobility vehicle, 2002

Cougar H (4×4)
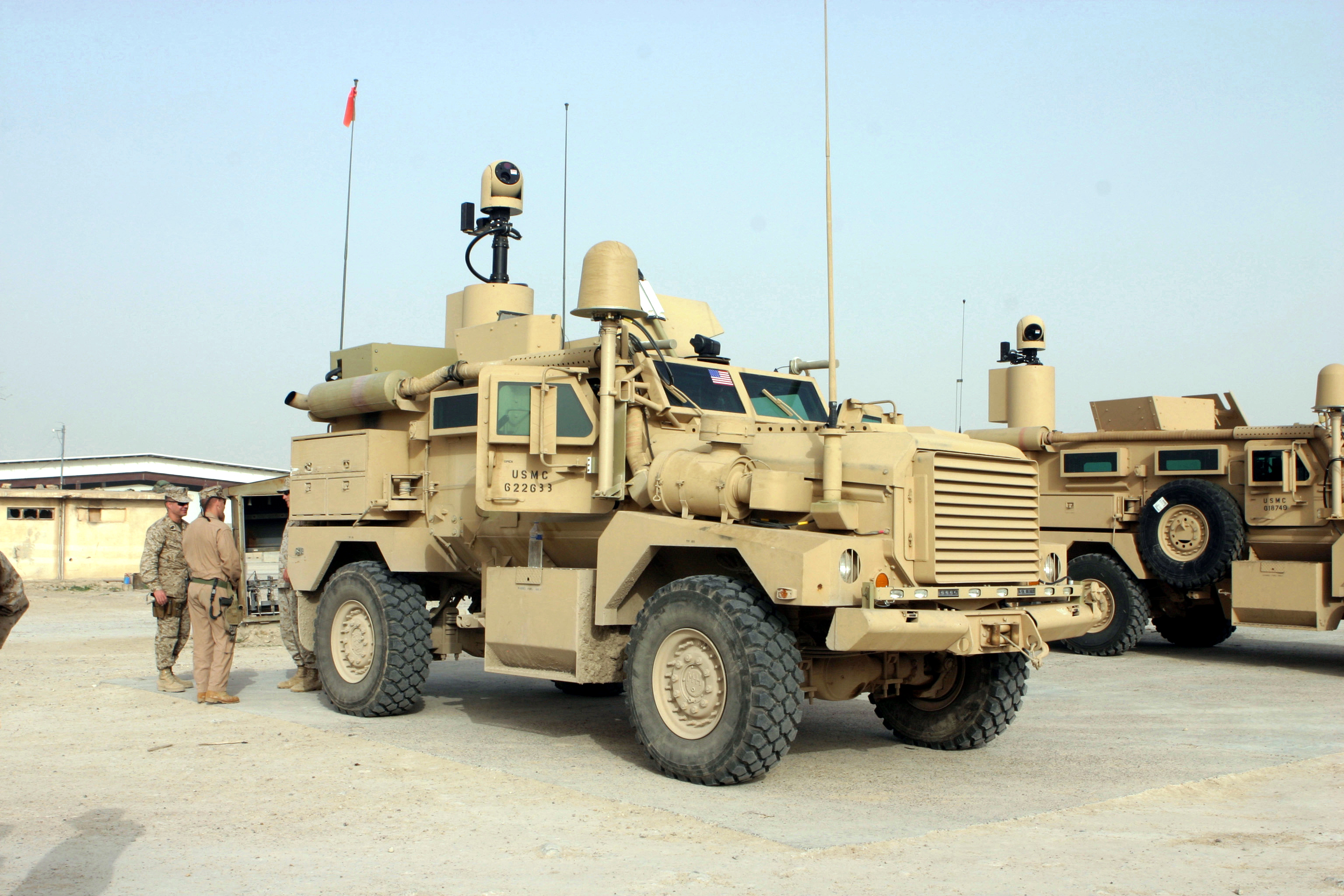
- Cougar in service with a US Marine unit in Iraq
- Type: Infantry mobility vehicle with MRAP capabilities
- Place of origin: United States

Service history
- Used by: See Operators
- Wars: War in Afghanistan; Iraq War; Syrian Civil War; Second Libyan Civil War; Russo-Ukrainian War: War in Donbas; Russian invasion of Ukraine

Production history
- Designer: Technical Solutions South Africa
- Manufacturer: Force Protection, Inc.
- Unit cost: $475,000
- Produced: 2002
- Variants: See Variants

Specifications
- Mass: Curb: 32,000 lb (14.5 t); Gross max: 38,000 lb (17.2 t)
- Length: 19.41 ft (5.91 m)
- Width: 9.0 ft (2.74 m)
- Height: 8.67 ft (2.64 m)
- Crew: 2+4
- Armor: up to STANAG 4569 Level 3
- Main armament: Optional remote weapon station (Common Remotely Operated Weapon System II)
- Secondary armament: Optional firing ports
- Engine: Caterpillar C-7 Diesel I6; 330 HP (243 kW)
- Payload capacity: 6,000 lb (2.72 t)
- Transmission: Allison 3500SP automatic
- Suspension: 4×4 wheeled
- Ground clearance: 15 in (410 mm)
- Operational range: 600 mi (966 km)
- Maximum speed: 65 mph (105 km/h)

Cougar HE (6×6)
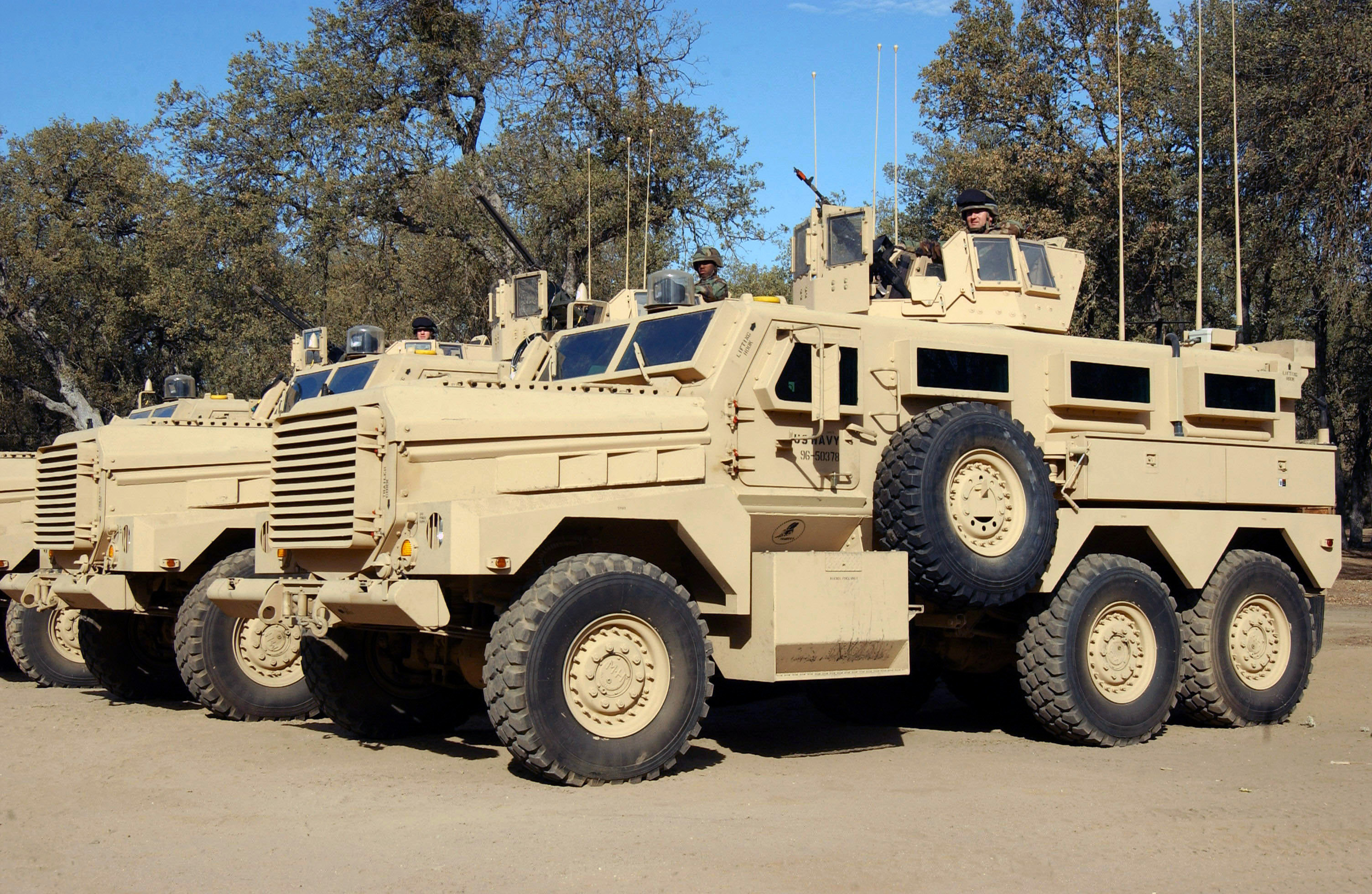
- Cougar HE
- Type: Mine-Resistant Ambush Protected Vehicle
- Place of origin: United States; South Africa

Service history
- Used by: United States Armed Forces; British Army
- Wars: Iraq War

Production history
- Designer: Technical Solutions (South Africa)
- Manufacturer: Force Protection, Inc.
- Unit cost: $644,000
- Produced: 2002
- Variants: See Variants

Specifications
- Mass: Curb: 38,000 lb (17.2 t); Gross max: 49,000 lb (22.2 t); Mastiff: 50,000 lb (22.7 t) maximum
- Length: 7.08 m (23.25 ft)
- Width: 2.74 m (9.0 ft)
- Height: 2.64 m (8.67 ft)
- Crew: 2+8
- Armor: all-round protection from .50 BMG
- Main armament: Optional remote weapon station (Common Remotely Operated Weapon System II)
- Secondary armament: Optional firing ports
- Engine: Caterpillar C-7 Diesel I6; 243 kW (330 hp)
- Payload capacity: 13,000 lb (5.90 t)
- Transmission: Allison 3500SP automatic
- Suspension: 6×6 wheeled
- Ground clearance: 15 in (410 mm)
- Operational range: 600 miles (966 km)
- Maximum speed: 65 mph (105 km/h)

The Cougar is a mine-resistant ambush-protected (MRAP) and infantry mobility vehicle structured to be resistant to landmines and improvised munitions.

It is a family of armored vehicles produced by Force Protection Inc, which manufactures ballistic and mine-protected vehicles. The vehicles are integrated by Spartan Motors. These vehicles are protected against small arms, land mines and improvised explosive devices (IEDs) using a combination of design features and materials to protect both the crew and engine compartment against a wide range of attacks. A monocoque type, V-shaped hull extends to the engine bay and serves to direct the blast away from under the vehicle. The dual air-conditioners help keep heavily dressed troops from overheating in temperatures over 100 °F (38 °C) in Iraq.

== Development ==
Force Protection, Inc. was formed in 2002 when Sonic Jet purchased Technical Solutions Group, using the name Sonic Jet until 2004. Technical Solutions Group had been a defense company in the US that was involved in a range of products, including mine-resistant vehicles based on South African designs. Two vehicles were sold to the US Army for evaluation which were used for ordnance clearance on Army ranges, and eight heavily protected vehicles, called Tempest, were sold to the British Army in 2001; these were fitted with an extra ceramic armored bellyplate for protection against Yugoslav TMRP-6 "tank-killer" mines intended to attack the center of a vehicle.

In early 2004 the United States Marine Corps (USMC) visited Force Protection and, having seen a photo-montage of a new design of MRAP on a company brochure, asked if it could be produced and delivered within 6 months of an order for operations in Iraq. The photo was a still only concept image, but a senior person in the company offered to design, develop and build a new vehicle, that met the USMC requirement, within the deadline of 6 months. This was achieved in spite of limited funds and having to set up and train personnel in military-type projects. The package handed over to the USMC in October 2004 also included an initial set of spares and technical publications. Given that most defence companies quote at least ten years to develop a new vehicle, to have achieved this in some five and a half months was extraordinary.

The new design differed in many respects from the earlier South African vehicles, although in order to provide a degree of continuity for government contracting reasons, it retained the name "Cougar" given to two earlier GMC-powered vehicles sold to the US Army. The new Cougar had a single hull bottom-plate that ran the whole length of the vehicle, and this formed the basis of the protection of both the crew compartment and the engine-bay. It made for a much stiffer hull, with fewer welds, adding to the overall level of blast-protection. The structure of the hull around the commander and driver was considerably strengthened to add to the torsional stiffness of the vehicle, and the hull-sides were redesigned to provide additional space for troops or equipment. A full armor-upgrade pack was offered from the start, and the design specifically allowed for the addition of advanced armor systems such as the British chobham type.

Growth potential was limited in many of the South African designs, and this was addressed from the outset in the new Cougar. Heavier axles and a more powerful engine and transmission were selected, all of which were already in use in the US and other forces that were thought to be likely users of the Cougar. Logistic support was a major design requirement, and the components chosen were carefully assessed for the level of support that their respective original equipment manufacturers could provide.

Above all, the new design was developed under the auspices of first-world defence standards such as the United States Military Standard and the UK's Defstans, both of which also conformed with NATO STANAGs. This required, amongst other things, that a full product safety-case be developed and maintained from the outset, as well as appropriate training needs analysis and spares predictions. This meant that the new Cougar was capable of being fully operational in a wide range of climatic conditions by fully-equipped and clothed NATO troops, based upon a 95-percentile NATO crewman.

The initial USMC requirement, based upon first meetings with Force Protection VPs, was written on half a page of foolscap. After further talks, the need for levels of mobility covering beach-operations resulted in a suggestion that the 4x4 design should be augmented by a 6x6 version, which would also have a larger payload and volume in the cargo area. It was this version that led to increased US Army interest, as they had a need for a vehicle to carry a large explosive ordnance disposal robot. Subsequent meetings with the Army also led to changes in some of the major sub-systems to ensure even greater commonality with in-service equipment in order to ease training and support.

When the first Cougar was built, the USMC were asked if it might be retained for a month or two for testing. They replied that they had an urgent operational need for it in theater, but would take the advice of the VP handling the program about what to do. He said he felt that they should take the vehicle, to which the USMC program-lead replied "Good, we totally agree, for we know that you would never have designed a defective vehicle!" And so it left the factory, untested, and was in "action" a few days later in the Middle East.

The first 27 or so vehicles delivered to the USMC were called the Hardened Engineer Vehicle (HEV), a reference to the original intended Marine Corps operational role. This was changed to the 'Joint EOD Rapid Response Vehicle', or JERRV, when the Army joined the program and took over the prime-contractorship. Later, and to satisfy the needs of politicians to show that they were committed to the war in Iraq, the program was again changed to MRAP, at which time other companies became involved in the design and supply of similar vehicles, most of which were based in part, or entirely, upon the Cougar.

Some 7,000 of these vehicles were fielded under the US military's MRAP and other national vehicle programs. US Defense Secretary Robert Gates demanded that the vehicles be ordered in larger numbers after the Marines reported in 2004 that no troops had died in more than 300 IED attacks on Cougars. Since then, Cougar vehicles have been hit by improvised explosive devices many times in Iraq with few fatalities. Britain chose the Cougar over the RG-31 Nyala for their "Mastiff" APV.

Official data states that the Cougar is able to withstand a blast of at least 14 kg (30.86 lb) TNT under a wheel and 7 kg (15.43 lb) TNT under its belly.

== Variants ==
The Cougar comes in two main configurations, a 4×4, and 6×6. It is designed for the transport and protection of troops and equipment, especially against mines or IEDs. The two main configurations come in specific variants.

Cougar HEV (Hardened engineer vehicle)
4×4 and 6×6 vehicles ordered in 2004 by the USMC.

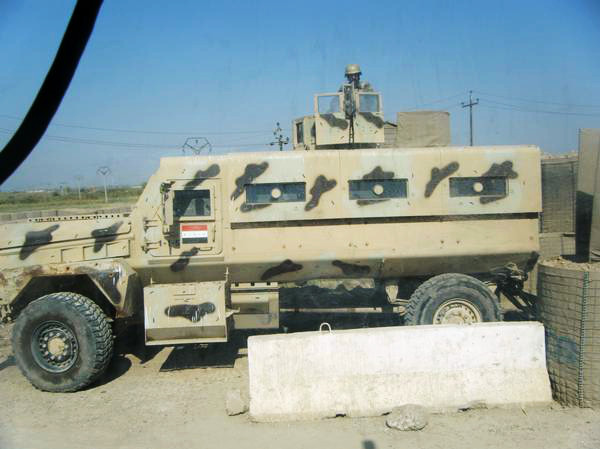
Badger Iraqi Light Armored Vehicle

Badger Iraqi Light Armored Vehicle (ILAV)
Based on the Cougar and manufactured by FPII and BAE Systems for the Iraqi Army. The ILAV is based on the Cougar, which can carry ten passengers (the six-wheel version can carry 16). The Cougar/ILAV vehicle uses a capsule design to protect the passengers and key vehicle components from mines and roadside bombs. The larger Cougar costs about $730,000 each, fully equipped. The Cougars have been very popular with American troops, and with Iraqis who have worked with them. 865 ILAVs were ordered by Iraq and 18 by Yemen. The ILAV gives the Iraqis the same degree of protection that most Coalition troops have.

Cougar JERRV (Joint EOD rapid response vehicle)
4×4 and 6×6 variants for the US Army, USAF, and USMC. Approx. 200 ordered in 2005 and 2006, with another 200 ordered in late 2006 but now called MRAPs to take account of the new US military/political initiative to be seen to be responding to public concerns about casualties.

Cougar ISS
Based on the Cougar 4×4, the ISS is fitted with an integrated independent suspension system that gives the vehicle increased cross-country mobility.

Ridgback PPV (Protected Patrol Vehicle)
British version of the Cougar 4x4 from FPII base vehicles with a British armor package and electronics, including installation of Enforcer remote weapon stations on some vehicles. In 2015, Salisbury coroner David Ridley raised several "points of concern" relating to the vehicle when recording a narrative verdict on the deaths of four soldiers who drowned in Helmand, Afghanistan in June 2010.

Mastiff PPV (Protected Patrol Vehicle)
British version of the Cougar 6×6 which arrived in Afghanistan during December 2006, with FPII providing the base vehicle and NP Aerospace in the UK integrating electronics and the British armor package. Mastiff 2 is an improved version with a capacity of 2 + 8 which arrived in Afghanistan during June 2009. The Mastiff is armed with a 7.62 mm GPMG, 12.7 mm heavy machine gun or 40 mm grenade machine gun.

Mastiff 2 'Protected Eyes'
A version of the British Mastiff specially designed for the Talisman Counter-IED program. It is fitted with an M151 Protector remote weapon station, mine plow, optical camera and a Honeywell RQ-16 T-Hawk micro air vehicle with screens in the back to display its camera feed.

Wolfhound (Tactical Support Vehicle)
British modification of the Cougar 6×6, with FPII providing the base vehicle and NP Aerospace in the UK integrating electronics and the British armor package. The first Wolfhounds entered service in Afghanistan in October 2010. 130 have been ordered for gun tractor and logistical roles.

Timberwolf
Cougar variant that was being marketed by Malley Industries of Dieppe, New Brunswick Canada for the replacement of the RG-31 and LAV for the Canadian Forces; Malley Industries lost the contract to Textron TAPV.

Fire Support Cougar
Cougar 4x4 chassis fitted with the complete turret and main gun assembly of the Panhard AML-90 armored car. In service with the Djiboutian Army.

Recovery of Airbase Denied by Ordnance (RADBO)
Category I Cougar equipped with a U.S. Air Force-designed directed energy weapon, interrogator arm, console, and other features to clear unexploded ordnance from airfields.

== Operators ==
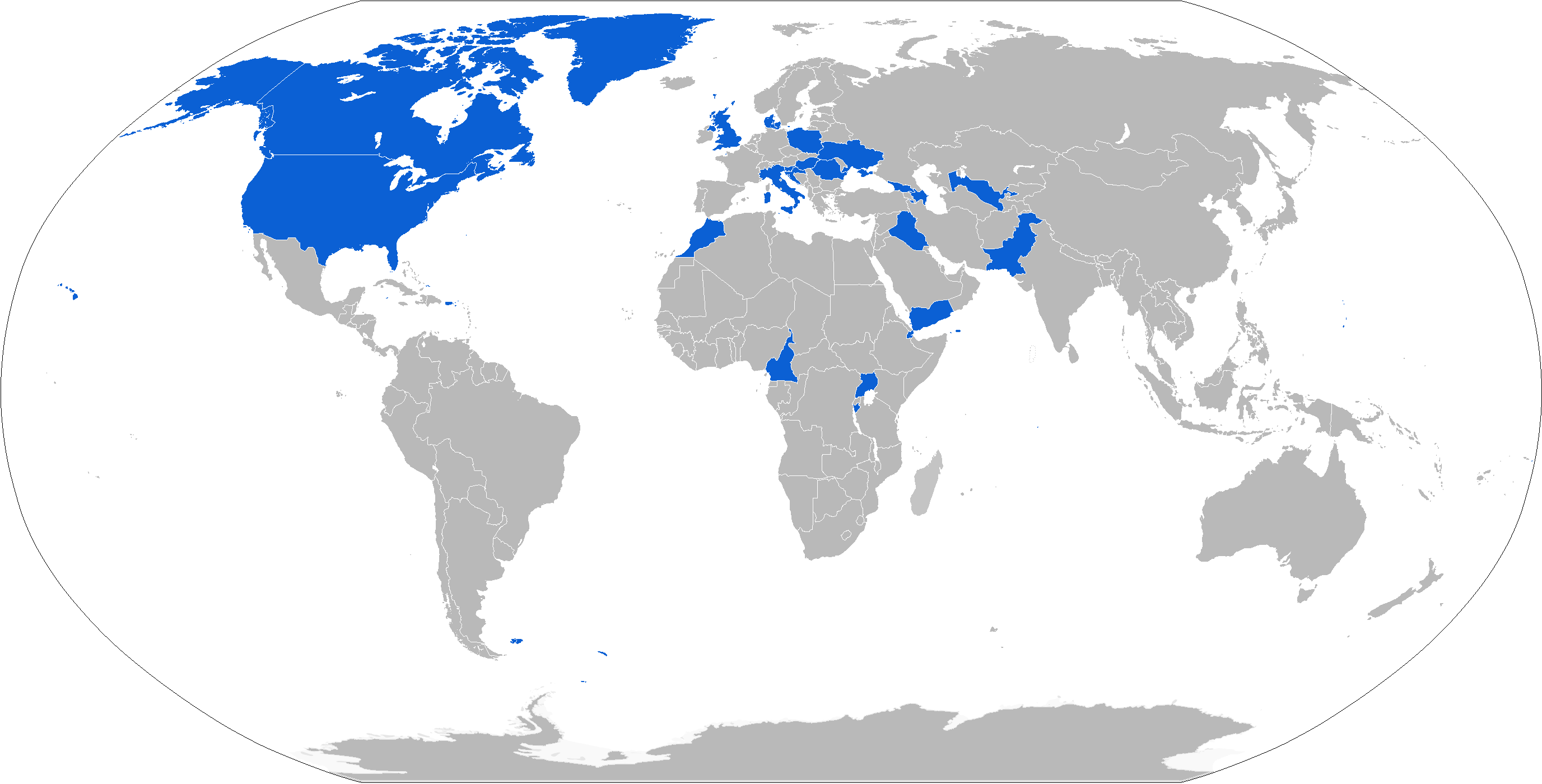
Map of Cougar operators in blue

- Azerbaijan – 4 used by peacekeeping forces
- Burundi – Donated for Burundian forces in Somalia.
- Cameroon – 6 in service
- Canada for Canadian Forces – 7 Cougar
- Croatia – 4+ US Army donated several Cougar MRAPs to the Croatian Army ISAF contingent in Afghanistan.
- Denmark – 40 Cougar loaned (not leased) from US from early-2011. Used in Afghanistan by the army.
- Djibouti – 12 for Djiboutian Army; some modified to accept 90 mm cannon and turrets adopted from Panhard AML armored cars.
- Georgia – 10 in service Georgian Land Forces. Also Georgian HQ units who are part of the ISAF are using the Cougar HEs in the Helmand Province.
- Hungary – 3+10 Cougar ordered
- Iraq – Badger – 378 ordered in 2007, another 865 ordered by 2011.
- Kurdistan Region
- Italy – Cougar HE used in Afghanistan by the Italian Army.
- Morocco – Unknown number of Cougar HE appeared in a Moroccan-Chinese movie shooting in Casablanca in which the Moroccan military vehicles were used.
- Pakistan – 20 Cougar JERRV (Buffalo Explosive Ordnance Disposal version) received from US under Coalition Support Fund in 2010.
- Poland – Lent Cougar H used by Polish contingent in Afghanistan from 2008, then 300 bought from US surplus, delivered from June 2022
- Romania – 4 in service with the Romanian Land Forces. Used by EOD troops.
- Slovenia – 7 in Slovenian Armed Forces service, to be upgraded in 2017 and 2018. Used by EOD units.
- Uganda – Donated to Ugandan forces in Somalia.
- Ukraine – Operates 20 with half being on loan to the OSCE. The UK donated an undisclosed number of Mastiffs following the 2022 Russian invasion of Ukraine in April 2022.
- United Kingdom – 400 Mastiffs, 125 Wolfhounds and 160 Ridgbacks.
- United States
  - Blackwater USA
  - US Army
  - US Navy
  - US Marine Corps
  - US Air Force
  - New London Police Department
- Uzbekistan
- Yemen

== Operational history ==
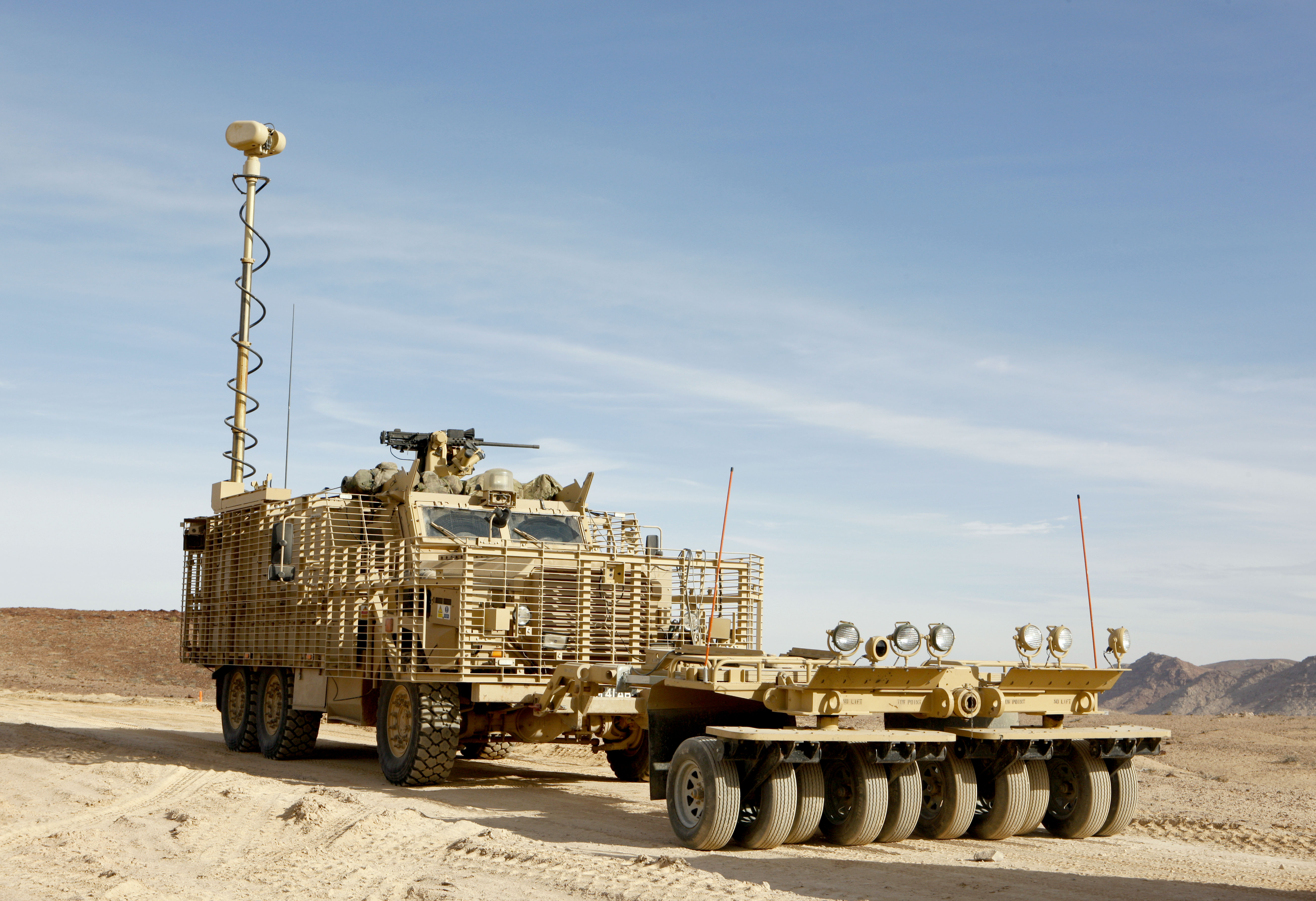
British Mastiff with Choker mine rollers in 2012

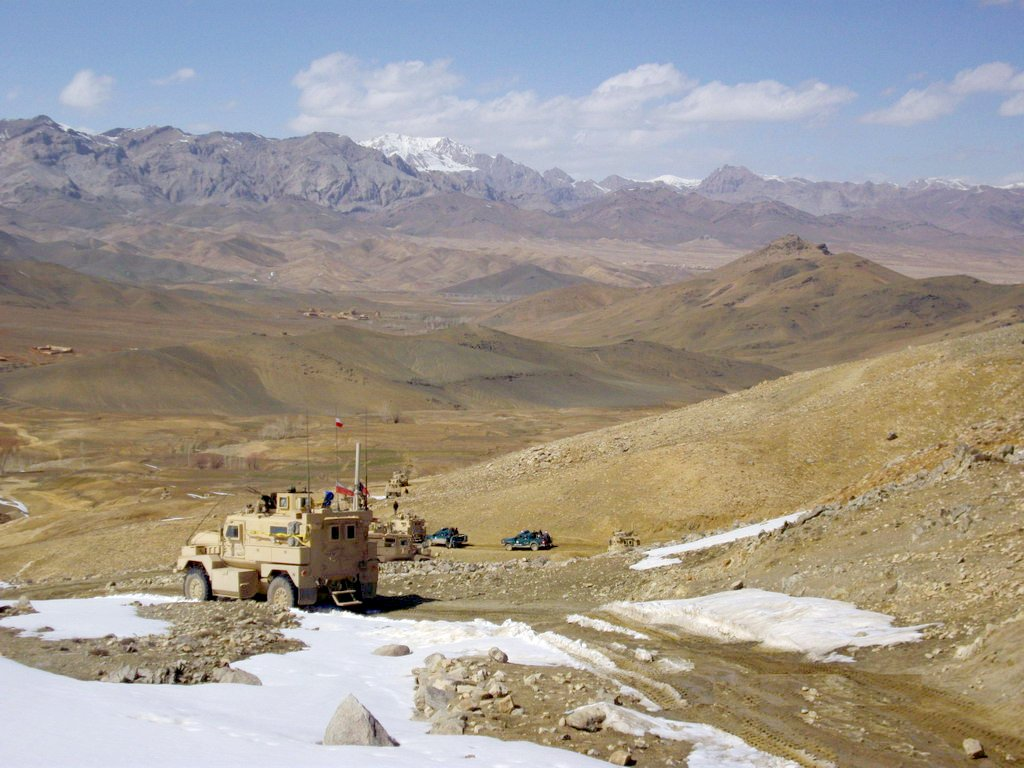
Polish Army Cougars in Afghanistan

The Cougar is used primarily by the United States Armed Forces and the British Army, as well as law enforcement agencies in the United States. In service with those countries, the Cougar is used in a variety of roles, including the HEV (Hardened Engineer Vehicle) and the Joint Explosive Ordnance Disposal Rapid Response Vehicles (JERRV) while in service with the US Marine Corps, US Navy Seabees, and US Air Force Rapid Engineer Deployable Heavy Operational Repair Squadron Engineers.

Compared to the original Cougar vehicle, the British variant is fitted with large, vertical armor plates that cover the large vision blocks and weapon firing ports. This is in line with British Army doctrine concerning the role of the APC/MICV, specifically that it is to carry troops under protection to the objective and give firepower support when they have disembarked. The Mastiff is fitted with a turret sporting either a L7A2 General Purpose Machine Gun, L110A1 Light Machine Gun, L11A1 Heavy Machine Gun or L134A1 40 mm Grenade Machine Gun. One aspect of the British Army's approach to APC/MICV units (which differs to that of the United States) is that the ability of the average soldier to fire accurately out the ports of a moving IFV has been questioned. The large armor plates add side protection from RPGs or IED explosions.

The British Army has operated an earlier MPV named "Tempest MPV". As of November 2008, the British Army has ordered over 400 Cougar vehicles for deployment in Iraq and Afghanistan following a series of Urgent Operational Requirements (UORs). Deliveries of the first 86 Mastiffs began in February 2007, and an order for 22 further vehicles was placed in March, bringing the total to 108. In October 2007, Gordon Brown announced a further 140 Mastiffs and 157 new Cougar 4x4 variants, named Ridgback were being ordered to protect troops from mines and roadside bombs.

Canada has deployed the Cougar since October 2007 in Afghanistan.

From November 2008, forty Cougar H were lent by the United States for the Polish contingent in Afghanistan. In Polish service they carried 7.62 mm PK machine guns.

On Jan 5, 2012 an Air Force EOD Team, Team Tripwire, three Airman, were killed by a remote detonated IED attack.

A British Mastiff suffered an IED attack in Afghanistan in April 2013 which caused three fatalities.

== Gallery ==
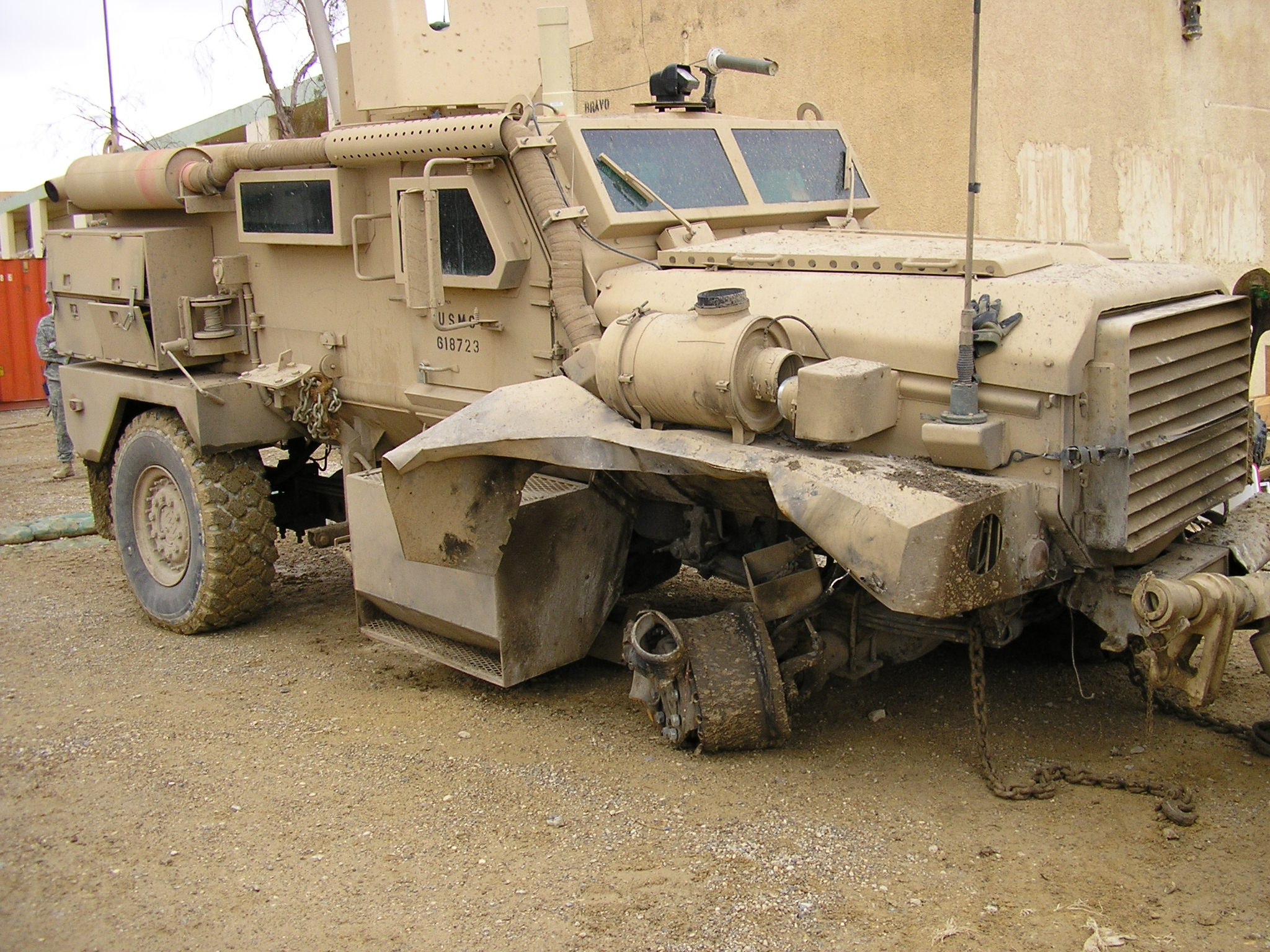
Cougar hit by a mine explosion, all crew survived, the vehicle was driven back to base on three wheels

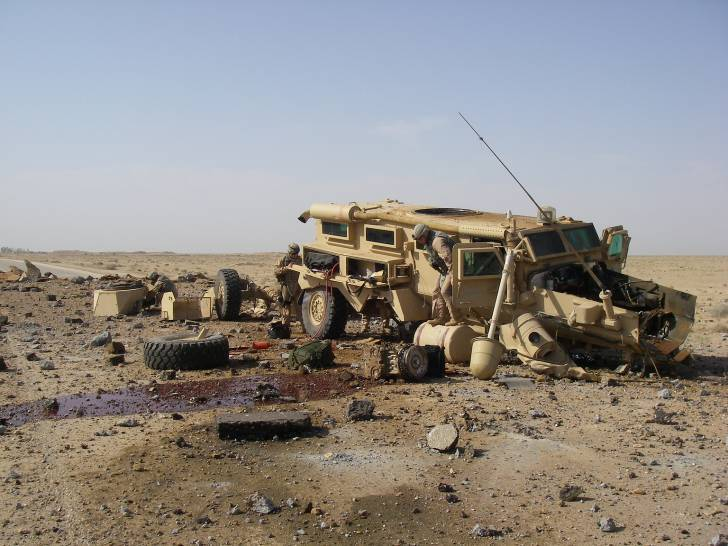
Cougar hit by 300–500 lb (140–230 kg) IED attack, all crew survived

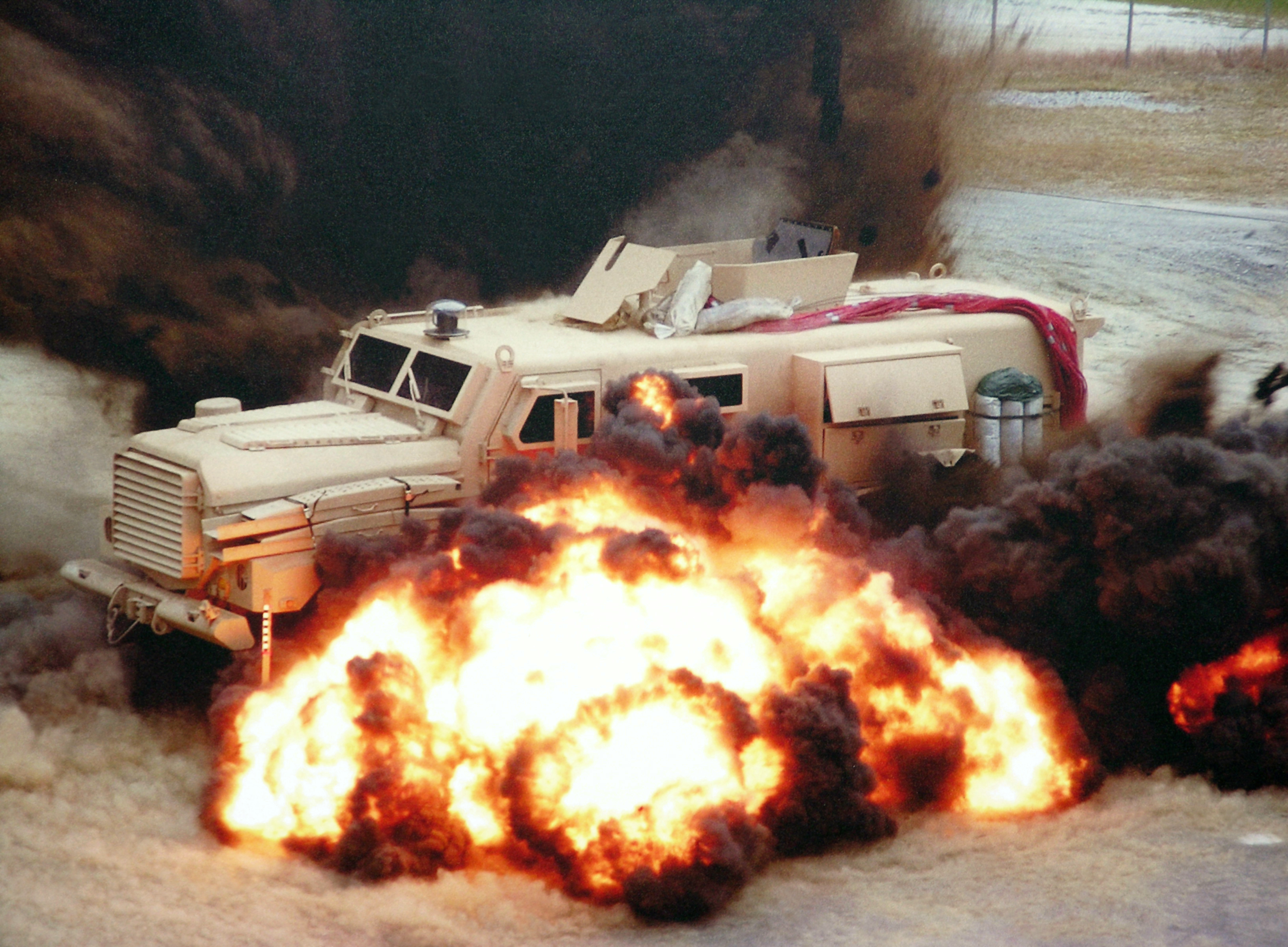
A Cougar undergoing an explosives test

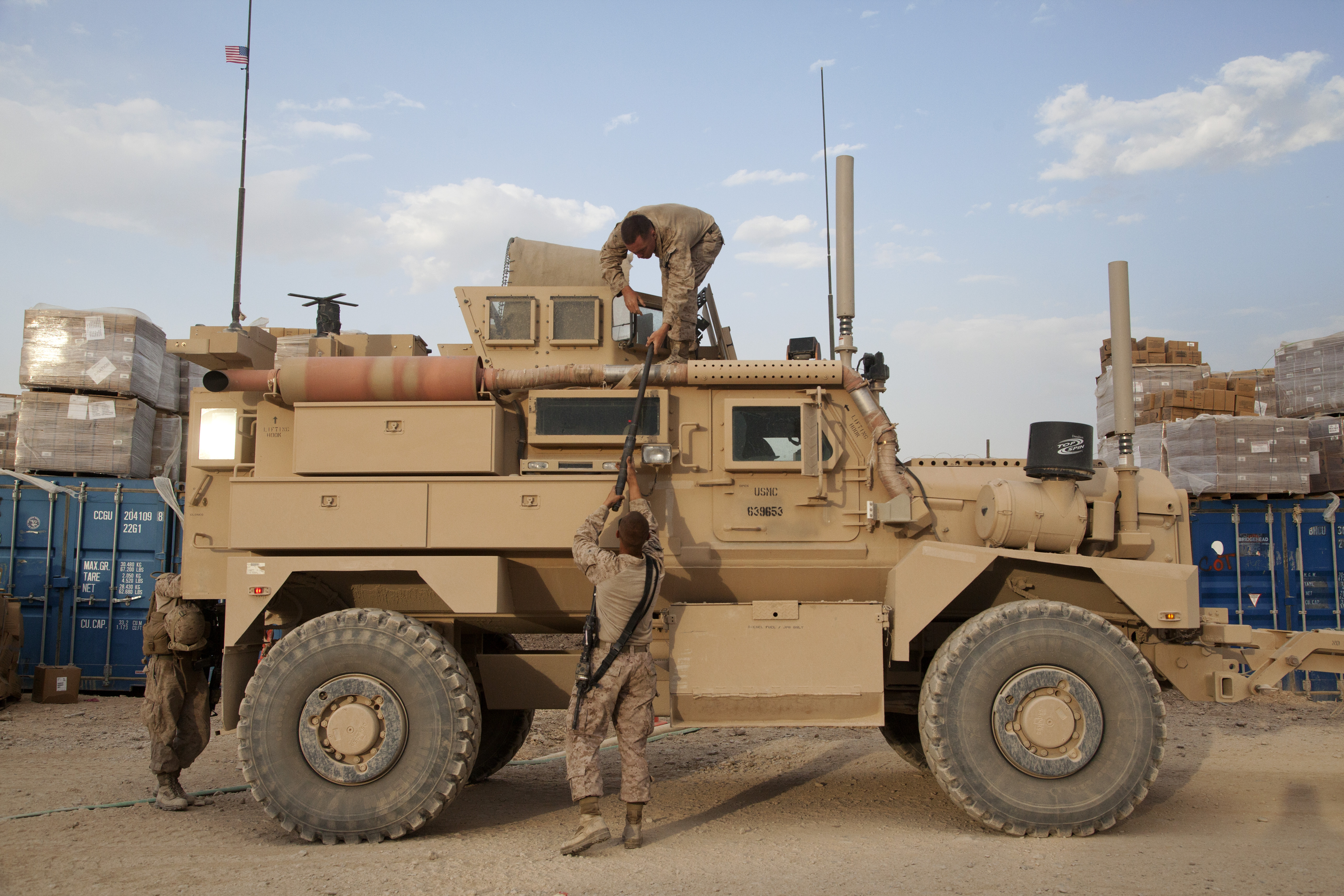
Cougar H

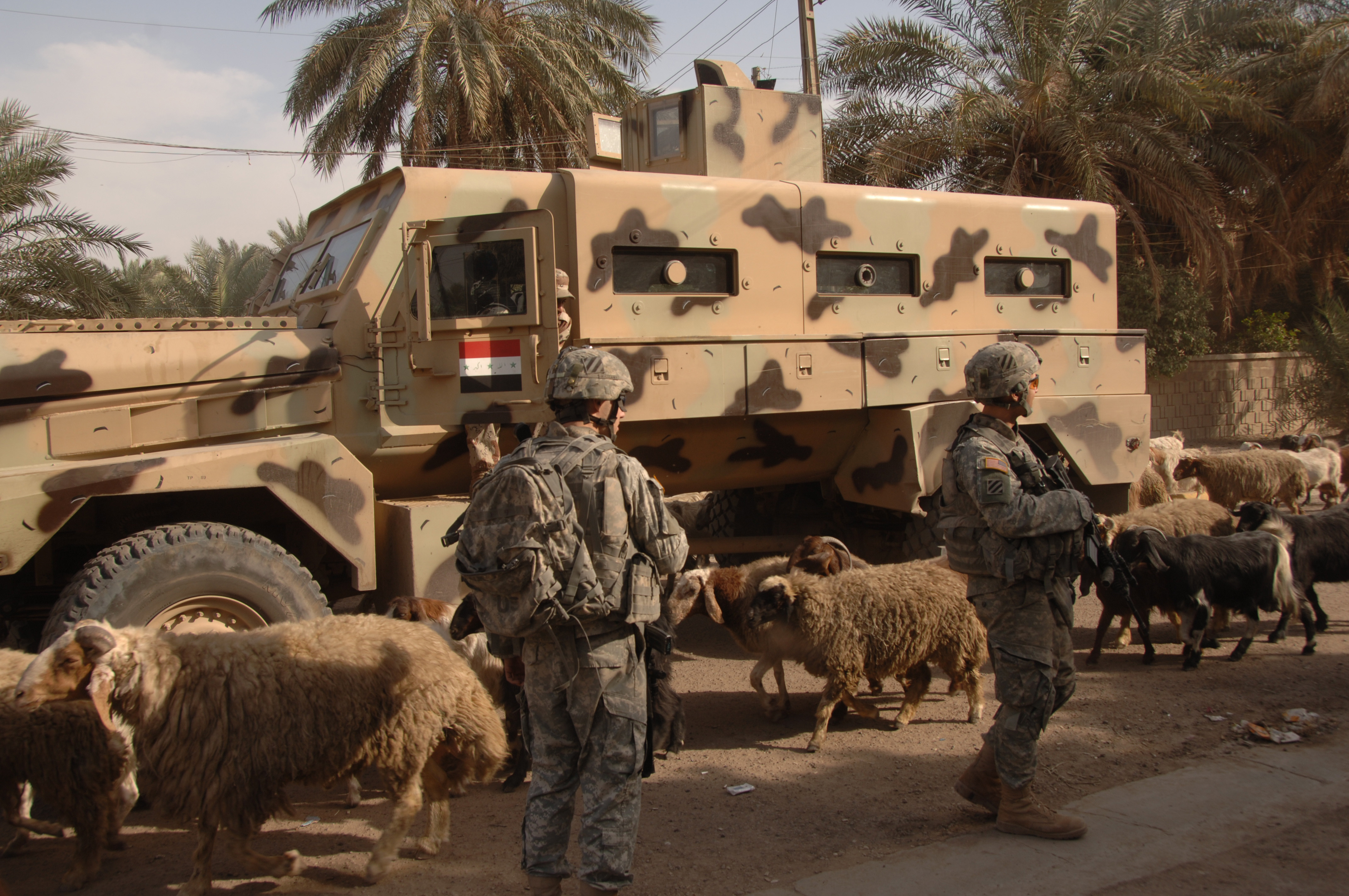
Iraqi Light Armored Vehicle and US Army Soldiers

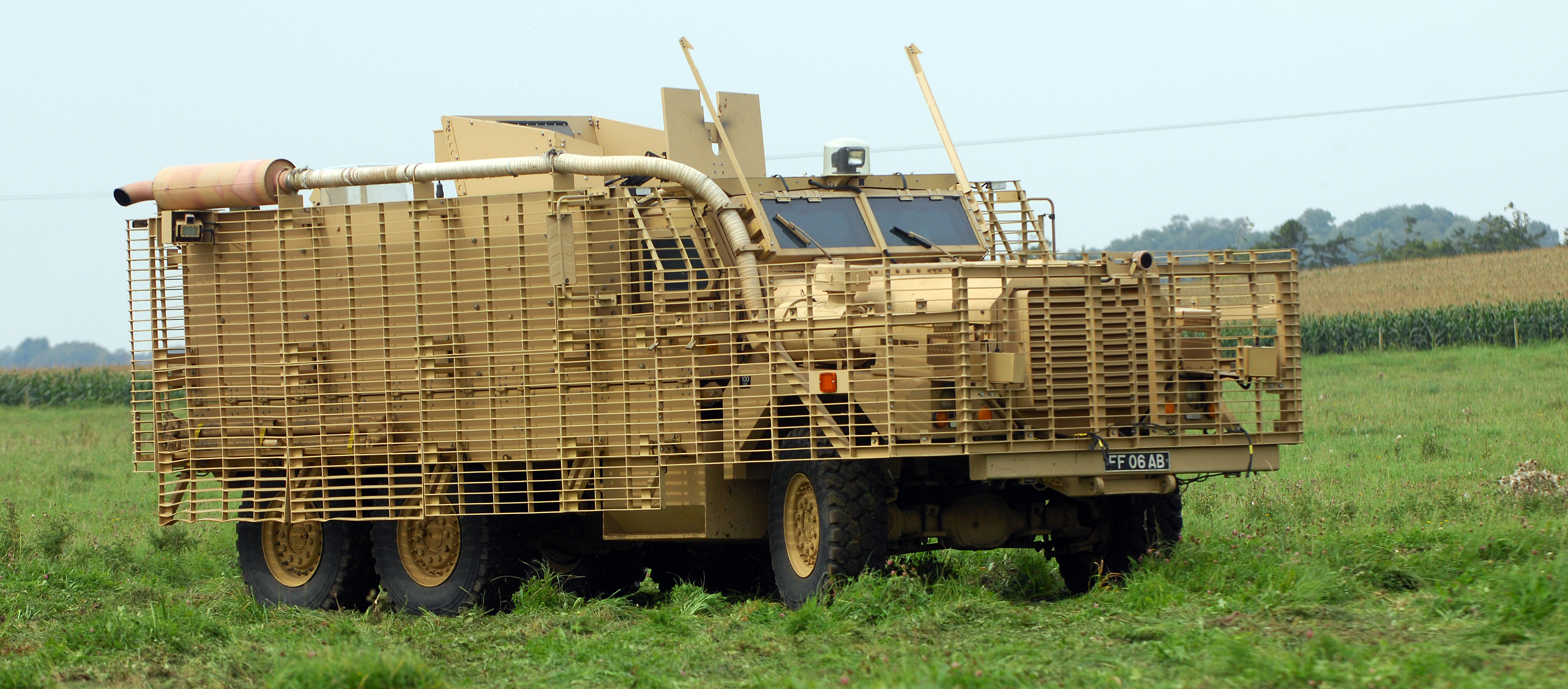
A British Mastiff Protected Patrol Vehicle in 2008

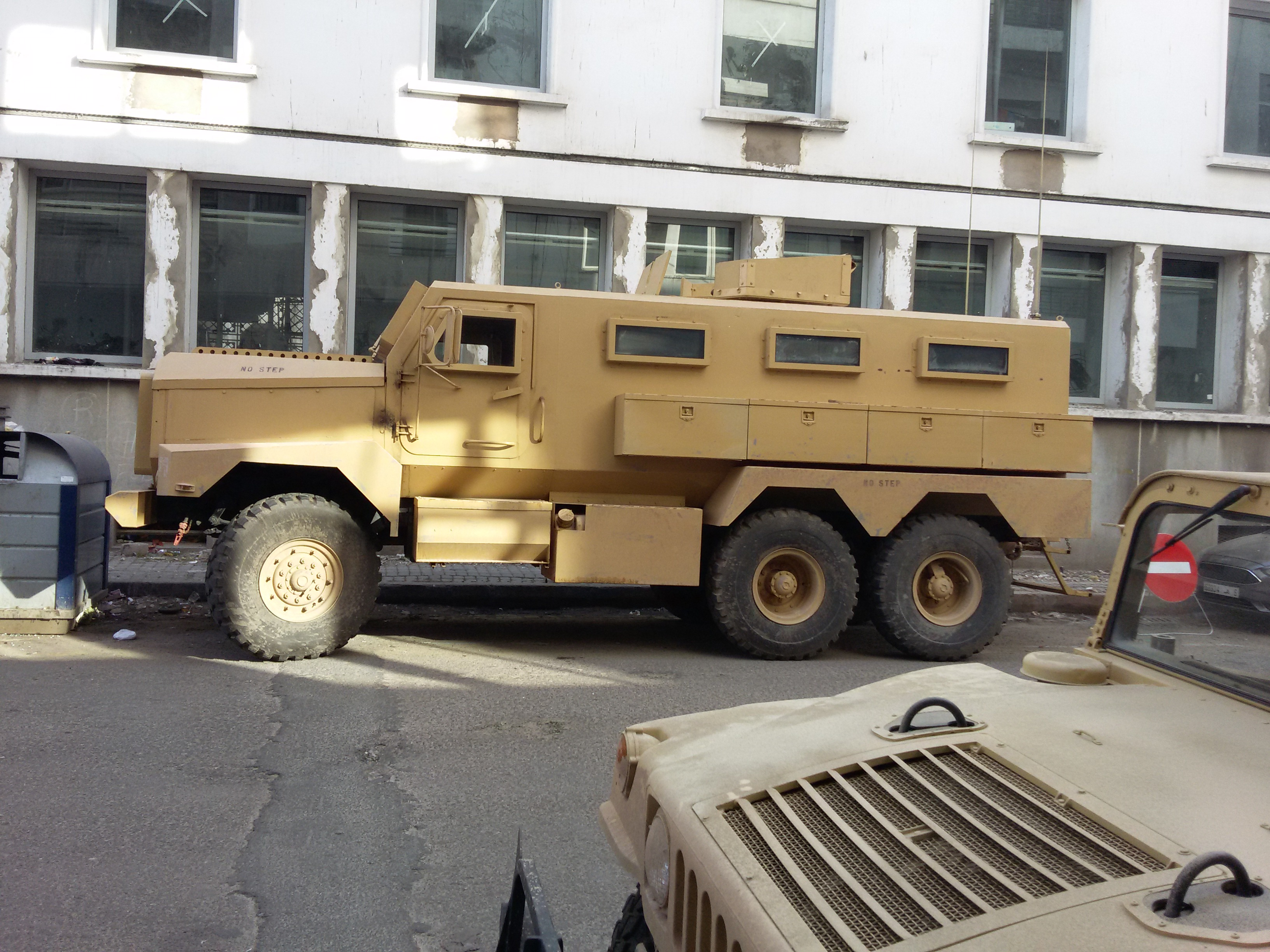
A Cougar HE in Casablanca during the shooting of the Moroccan-Chinese movie Operation Red Sea

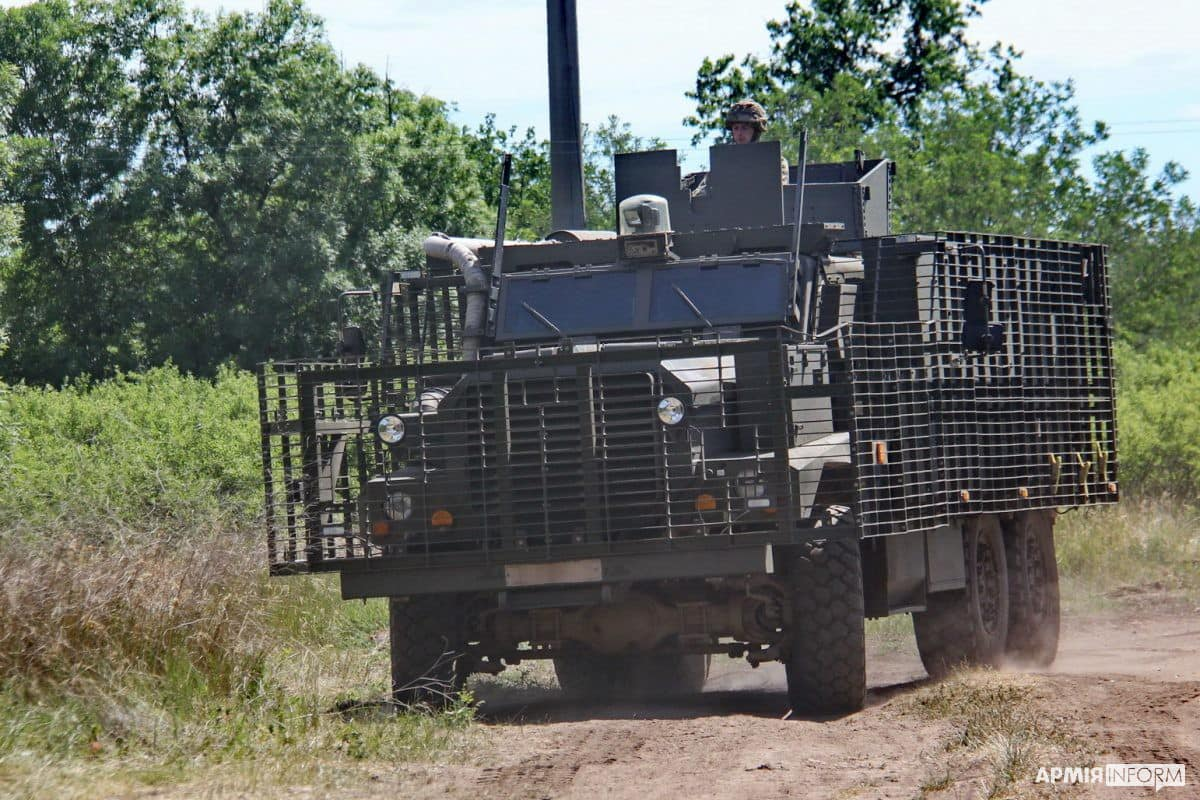
Modified Ukrainian Mastiff

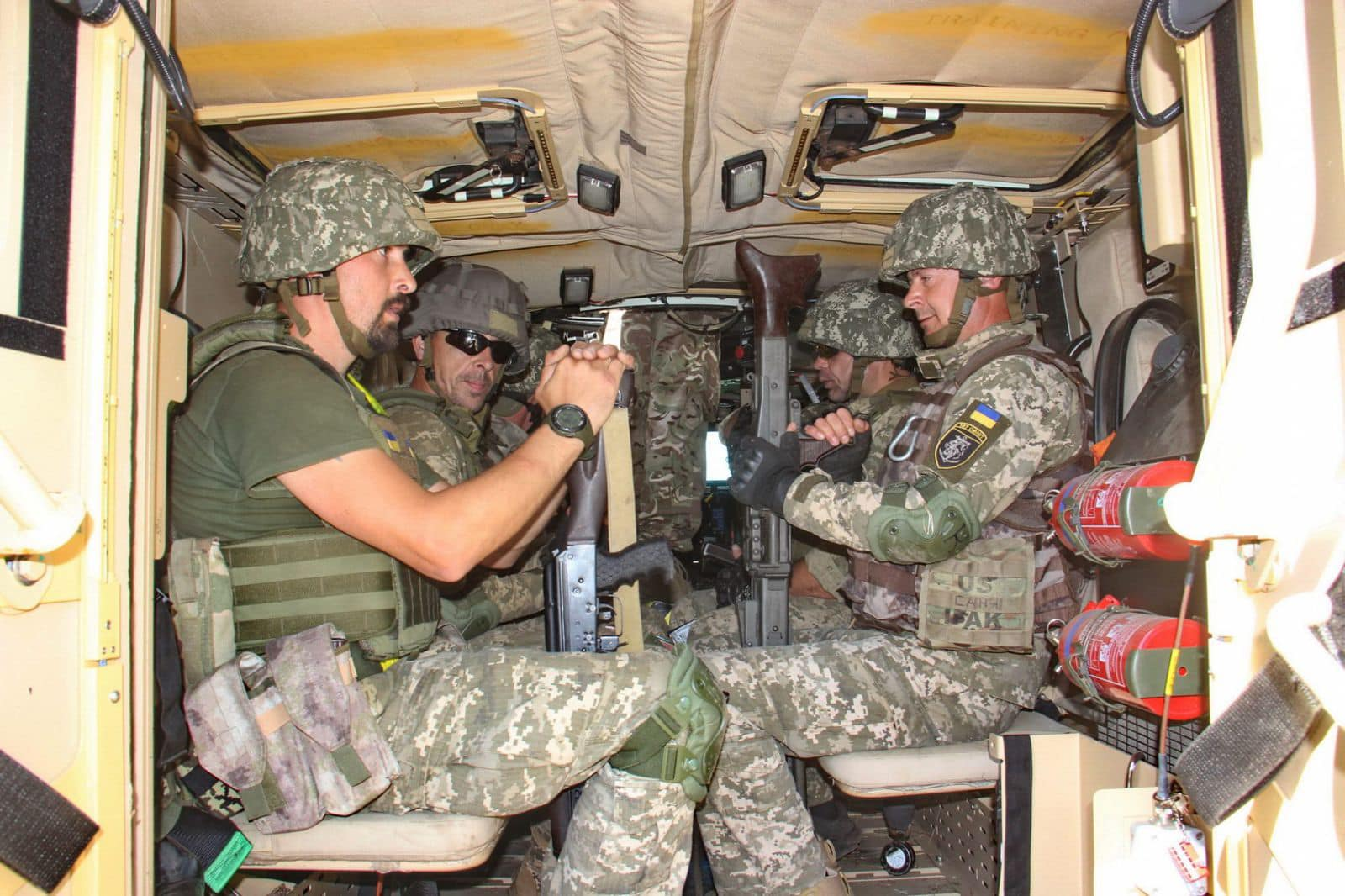
Ukrainian marines in a Mastiff vehicle, 2022
