= APC Talha =

Talha
- Type: Armored vehicle
- Place of origin: Pakistan

Service history
- In service: 2002 - Present
- Used by: Iraq; Pakistan
- Wars: Operation Lyari; War on terror Iraqi civil war (2006–2008)

Production history
- Designer: Heavy Industries Taxila
- Designed: 1998
- Manufacturer: APC Factory
- Developed from: M113A2 Mk.1
- Developed into: Saad APC
- Produced: 2002

Specifications
- Mass: 10.6 t (23,000 lb) (Curb weight); 12.5 t (28,000 lb) (Combat weight)
- Length: 218.5 inches (5.55 m)
- Width: 100 inches (2.5 m)
- Height: 102 inches (2.6 m)
- Crew: 1 (driver)
- Passengers: 12
- Armor: Type 5083 aluminum
- Main armament: Baktar Shikan ATGM (Maaz variant); RBS-70 surface to air missile (Mouz variant)
- Secondary armament: 7.62mm or 12.7mm machine gun
- Engine: Detroit Diesel 6V53T, 275 hp; KMDB UTD-20, 330 hp
- Power/weight: 22 hp/ton (6V53T); 25 hp/ton (UTD-20)
- Drive: Tracked
- Transmission: Allison TX 100-1A
- Suspension: Torsion bar, hydraulic dampers
- Fuel capacity: 360 L (79 imp gal)
- Operational range: 320 miles (510 km)
- Maximum speed: 42 mph (68 km/h) (level land)
- Steering system: Differential or pivot break

The Talha (Arabic: طلحہ) is an armoured personnel carrier (APC) developed by Pakistan's Heavy Industries Taxila (HIT) in the early 2000s.

== Overview ==
=== Background ===
Throughout the Cold War, the Pakistan Army relied on US-supplied M113s locally assembled at HIT as Pakistan remained a major Non-NATO ally of the west in that time frame. However, consequent of Project-706, the country was imposed with international sanctions which made it impossible for HIT to continue manufacturing the M113. Hence, the decision for the development of an indigenous APC came up. The APC was named after the fruitful tree of heaven called "Talha".

=== Design ===
Talha's design though based on the M113, was significantly different than the standard M113. The Talha had a facelifted front with the positions of the engine and driver station also being swapped. This allowed a flexibility in the design that the Engine compartment can accommodate power pack with 275 HP Detroit Diesel 6V53T turbocharged engine or a Ukrainian 330 HP UTD-20 engine. Firing ports were added throughout the hull design to enable the Talha's passengers to return fire in combat scenarios.

=== Protection ===
Talha's hull is made of reinforced Type 5083 aluminum which is sloped and angled at various points to provide better ballistic protection against rifle fire. HIT also offers an up-armoured version for law enforcement which has a spaced armour hull providing protection against 12.7mm Heavy Machine Gun fire. Moreover, it has external fuel tanks to provide more space and protection to the interior.

=== Marketing ===
HIT revealed the Talha to public and international markets during IDEAS-2002 at Karachi. The Pakistan army was the first customer which planned to deploy 2,000 Talha APCs by 2010.

In November 2004, the Iraqi Ministry of Defence signed a deal with HIT worth US$31 million in which it ordered 44 Talha APCs, 60 Mohafiz security vehicles and 300 Aahan Armoured Guard Posts making Iraq the first export customer for the Talha.

== Variants ==
Armoured Personnel Carriers (APC)

- Talha - Standard version.
- Talha-LEA (Law Enforcement Agencies) - Version developed for Law enforcement in Pakistan.

Infantry Fighting Vehicles (IFV)

- Talha-I - Upgraded version of Talha fitted with Turkish RCWS with better protection and performance. Revealed in IDEAS-2024.

Fire Support Vehicles (FSV)

- Maaz - Fitted with Baktar-Shikan anti-tank missile firing unit, based on Talha APC.
- Mouz - Fitted with RBS 70 surface-to-air missile firing unit, based on Talha APC.
- Sakb - Armoured Command and Control Vehicle, based on Talha APC.

A Sakb APC

Saad - Further development of the Talha APC

Armoured Personnel Carriers (APC)

- Saad - Further development of the Talha APC, based on 6 road wheels.

Armoured Recovery Vehicle (ARV)

- Al-Hadeed - ARV version based on chassis of Saad APC.

Infantry Fighting Vehicles (IFV)

- Viper - IFV version base on chassis of Saad APC.

== Operators ==
- Iraq
  - Iraqi Ground Forces: 44 delivered by HIT in 2006.
    - 3rd Division
    - 9th Armoured Division
- Pakistan
  - Pakistan Army: 400+ in service as of 2010. Total 2,000 planned to be deployed.
  - Sindh Police: 40 delivered in 2012.

== See also ==
- MT-LB – (Soviet Union)
- Type-63 APC – (China)
- AMX-10P – (France)
- MLVM – (Romania)
- Pansarbandvagn 302 – (Sweden)
- Mohafiz (vehicle) – (Pakistan)
- Hamza 6x6 – (Pakistan)
- Burraq MRAP vehicle – (Pakistan)

Related development

- M113 – (United States)

Related lists

- List of modern armoured fighting vehicles
