= Al Fahd 300 =

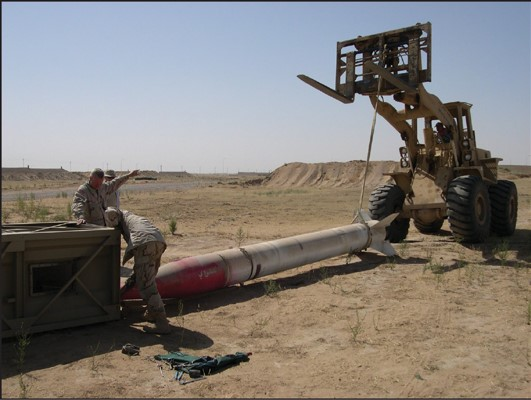
- An Al Fahd missile captured during the Iraq war
- Type: Short-range ballistic missile
- Place of origin: Iraq

Service history
- In service: Project abandoned

Production history
- Variants: Al Fahd 300; Al Fahd 500

Specifications
- Diameter: 600 mm booster 500 mm sustainer
- Engine: SA-2 Volga engine
- Payload capacity: 190 kg
- Propellant: solid propellant
- Operational range: Al Fahd 300:300 km Al Fahd 500:500 km

The Al Fahd 300 was an Iraqi solid-propelled short-range ballistic missile that was based on the Soviet S-75 Dvina surface-to-air missile. Its expected range was 300 km, which violated the limits provided by UNSC 687 which stipulated that Iraq was only allowed to have missiles with a range lower than 150 km. The missile project was thus halted and declared abandoned by 1993.

== Development and operational history ==
In August 1991 Iraq secretly started work on the J-1 surface-to-surface missile based on the S-75 Dvina without notifying UNSCOM. During the development of the missile the Ababil-100 had already been declared and Iraq later on admitted to hiding its Fahd missile project with the Ababil-100 as similarities would be observed between J-1 and Ababil-100. Iraq had declared the project abandoned in May 1993, and had had six tests between January and April 1993 and provided UNSCOM details. Iraq had declared the range to be 134 km but UNSCOM could not verify it. Lt.Gen Hussein Kamel al-Majid had issued the orders for the project and its secrecy. 21 flight tests were claimed overall and the UNSCOM ordered the destruction for 9 of such missiles.

== Al Fahd 500 ==
The 500 km range version although being displayed at the 1989 Baghdad arms exposition did not reach the design stage and according to Pentagon Opinion was a mock-up for a propaganda campaign.

== See also ==
- Qaher-1, a Houthi surface-to-surface missile also based on S-75 Dvina
- Prithvi-I, an Indian surface-to-surface missile also based on S-75 Dvina
- Al Fat'h solid propelled missile with some similarities
- Al Samoud liquid propelled missile with some similarities
