= Mohafiz (vehicle) =

Family of armoured security vehicles

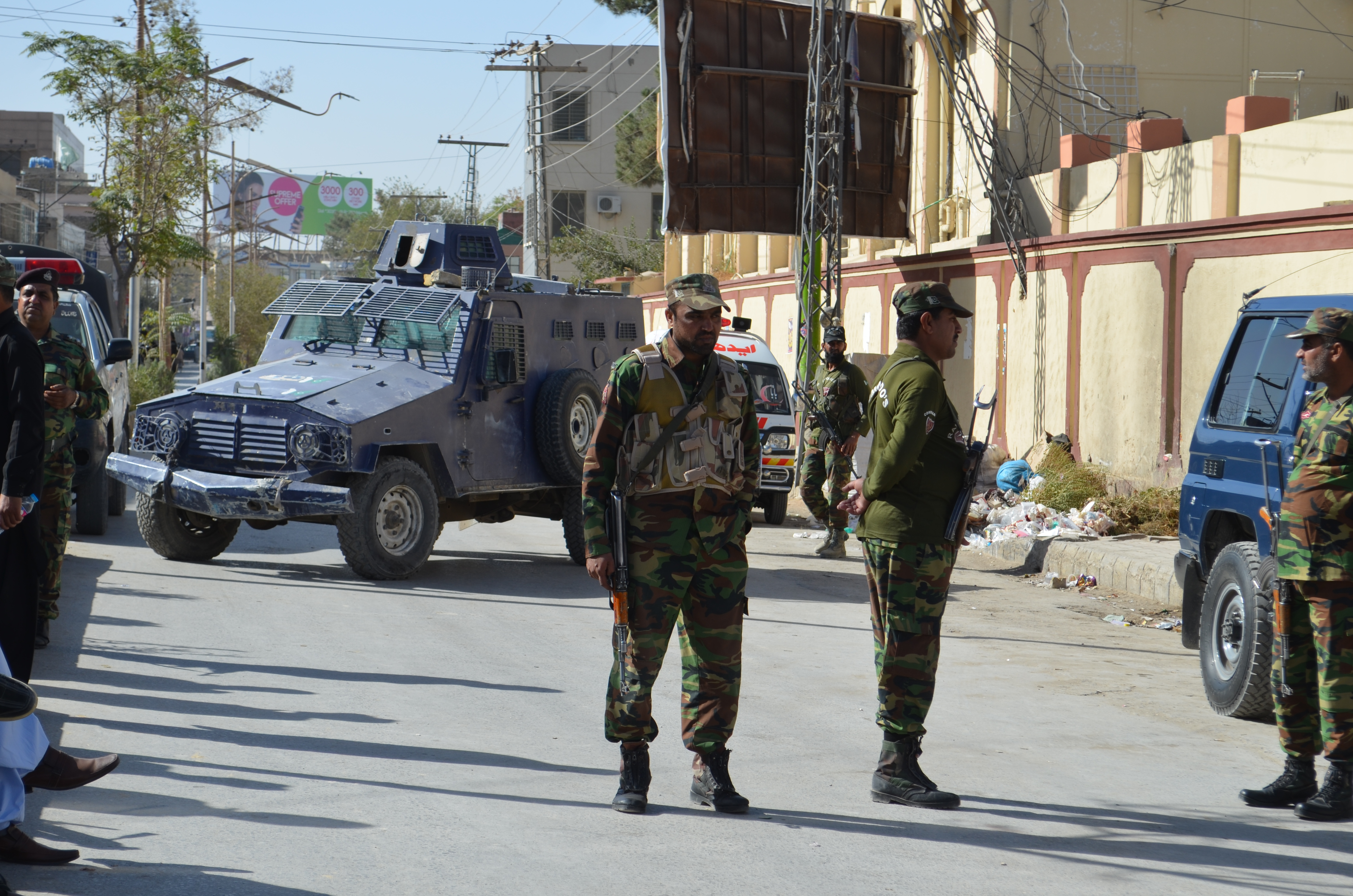
- A Mohafiz vehicle outside a Quetta police training college in the aftermath of an attack
- Type: Internal security vehicle Infantry Mobility Vehicle
- Place of origin: Pakistan

Service history
- In service: 2003–present
- Used by: Pakistan; Iraq; Sudan
- Wars: Insurgency in Khyber Pakhtunkhwa; Insurgency in Balochistan; Insurgency in Sindh; Operation Lyari; MQM militancy MQM violence (1994–2016); Iraqi conflict Iraq War (2003 – 2011); Occupation of Iraq (2003–2011); Iraqi insurgency (2003–2011); Iraqi insurgency (2003-2006); Iraqi civil war (2006–2008); War in Iraq (2013–2017); Sudanese civil war (2023–present)

Production history
- Designer: Heavy Industries Taxila; Cavalier Group (Mohafiz IV)
- Manufacturer: Heavy Industries Taxila
- Produced: 2003–present

The Mohafiz (also spelt Muhafiz) is a family of internal security vehicles designed and manufactured by Heavy Industries Taxila (HIT), Pakistan, with Cavalier Group also designing later production models.

== Development ==
Early in 2000, HIT started design work on a new 4×4 internal security (IS) vehicle called the Mohafiz. This was first shown in mid-November 2000 and in December 2000 started extensive trials.

== Engine ==
It is powered by a 4.2 litre diesel engine coupled to a manual transmission with five forward and one reverse gears and a two speed transfer case. If required, a more powerful 4.5 litre diesel engine could be installed to provide a higher power-to-weight ratio.

Although the first example of the Mohafiz is based on a Toyota Land Cruiser chassis, it could also be built on other 4 × 4 chassis. This includes the Land Rover Defender 110 (4 × 4), which is already in service with the Pakistan Army in large numbers.

Vehicles supplied to Iraq were based on a Land Rover 110 (4 × 4) chassis.

== Design ==
The Mohafiz ISV/IMV has an all-welded aluminium armour body that provides the occupants with protection from small arms fire up to 7.62 mm in calibre and shell splinters. The fully enclosed engine compartment is at the front with the crew compartment extending to the rear.

The commander and driver are seated at the front and provided with bulletproof windows to their front and a forward opening door with a bulletproof window in the upper part of either side. These bulletproof windows are covered by wire mesh screens. The bulletproof windows provide the same level of protection as the armoured hull. The vehicle has bullet proof wind screens and run fiat tyres. Sealing capacity Is 8 persons with 6 firing ports on sides.

The troop compartment is at the rear with the troops seated on either side on bench seats and enter the vehicle via a large door in the rear opening to the right.

Bulletproof windows are provided in the sides and rear of the troop compartment. A total of ten firing ports are provided to allow rifles and other small arms to be used from within the vehicle. The upper parts of the hull slope slightly inwards as does the hull rear.

Mounted on the forward part of the roof is a manually operated one person turret armed with a 7.62 mm machine gun and/or a tear gas grenade launcher and a two part roof hatch which opens left and right. Vehicles delivered to Iraq are fitted with a one-person turret armed with a 7.62 mm PKM machine gun.

To the immediate rear of the turret are two forward opening roof hatches although the design of the vehicle is flexible so that various types of roof hatch arrangement are possible.

== Deployment history ==
=== Pakistan ===
The Mohafiz have been heavily used by Pakistani security forces in the Balochistan province of Pakistan. In March 2020, a Frontier Corps (South Balochistan) convoy was ambushed by BLF terrorists at Buleda in Kech District. A heavy gunfight ensued with the Militants and in the process, the Mohafiz was struck by an Improvised explosive device, however the IMV survived the explosion.

=== Iraq ===
In November 2004, the Iraqi Ministry of Defence signed a deal with HIT worth US$31 million in which it ordered 44 Talha APCs, 60 Mohafiz security vehicles and 300 Aahan Armoured Guard Posts making Iraq the first export customer for the Mohafiz, with deliveries beginning in March 2005.

=== Sudan ===
In August 2026, it was reported by the Sudan Tribune that, according to military sources, the Sudanese Army had begun receiving Mohafiz-V infantry mobility vehicles the previous month, as part of a larger defence package by Pakistan, in order to support operations during the ongoing civil war against the paramilitary Rapid Support Forces. According to 2 unnamed Sudanese army officers, a total of 100 vehicles had received by the army in consecutive deliveries. They also added that veficles like Mohafiz-V were well suited to the terrain of the Sudanese provinces of Darfur and Kordofan, providing high mobility while having low maintenance. Military experts stated that the Mohafiz vehicles provided the Sudanese Army with a tactical counter to the RSF’s reliance on highly mobile technical pickup trucks in urban warfare and highway patrols. Though Saudi Arabia and Qatar were named as backers of the deal, neither country spoke on the claims. The Mohafiz vehicles provide also B6 or B7 ballistic protection from small arms fire along with shrapnel, helping to protect infantry crews inside during active combat. Prior to the Mohafiz purchase, the Sudanese Army had largely relied on locally-made weapons such as the Sarsar-2.

== Variants ==
- Mohafiz - First model.
- Mohafiz II - Second model based on the Land Rover Defender.
- Mohafiz III (Protector) B7 Level - Third model based on the Toyota LC79 series chassis.
- Mohafiz IV (Interceptor) - Forth model based on the Toyota LC79 series chassis.
- Mohafiz V (B6 Level) - Fifth model based on the Toyota LC79 series chassis with major improvements. Developed & manufactured jointly by the Cavalier group and Heavy Industries Taxila (HIT).

== Operators ==
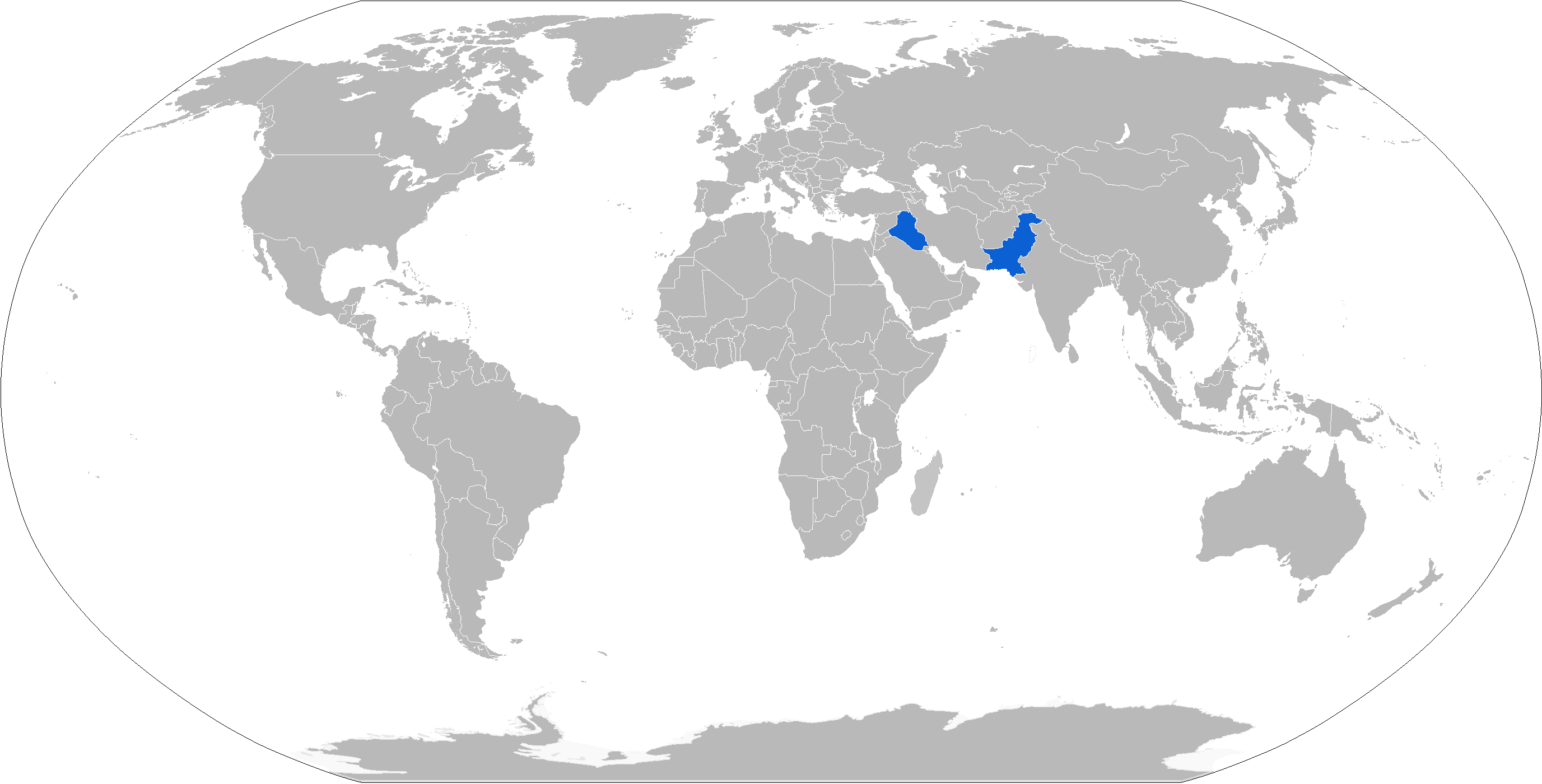
Map with Mohafiz operators in blue

=== Current military operators ===
- Iraq
  - Iraqi Army - 60 Mohafiz ISV's delivered by Pakistan in 2006.
- Pakistan
  - Civil Armed Forces
    - Frontier Corps
      - Frontier Corps KPK (North)
      - Frontier Corps KPK (South)
      - Frontier Corps Balochistan (North)
      - Frontier Corps Balochistan (South)
    - Pakistan Rangers
      - Punjab Rangers
      - Sindh Rangers
- Sudan
  - Sudanese Army

=== Civilian operator ===
- Pakistan
  - Punjab Police
  - Sindh Police - 60 delivered by Wah Ordnance Factory in 2012.

== See also ==
- APC Talha
- Burraq MRAP vehicle
- Hamza 6x6
