= Metepa =

Names
- IUPAC name 1-[Bis(2-methyl-1-aziridinyl)phosphoryl]-2-methylaziridine
- Preferred IUPAC name 1,1′,1″-Phosphoryltris(2-methylaziridine)
- Other names Methaphoxide; Metapoxide; Methyl aphoxide METEPA; Trimethylaziridinylphosphine oxide MAPO; Tris(1,2-propylene)phosphoramide; Tris(2-methyl-1-aziridinyl)phosphine oxide

Identifiers
CAS Number	57-39-6
3D model (JSmol)	Interactive image
ChemSpider	54938
ECHA InfoCard	100.000.296
KEGG	C19556
PubChem CID	60976
UNII	9PB481H025
CompTox Dashboard (EPA)	DTXSID5020815
- InChI: InChI=1S/C9H18N3OP/c1-7-4-10(7)14(13,11-5-8(11)2)12-6-9(12)3/h7-9H,4-6H2,1-3H3 Key: AVUYXHYHTTVPRX-UHFFFAOYSA-N; InChI=1/C9H18N3OP/c1-7-4-10(7)14(13,11-5-8(11)2)12-6-9(12)3/h7-9H,4-6H2,1-3H3 Key: AVUYXHYHTTVPRX-UHFFFAOYAF
- SMILES: CC1CN1P(=O)(N2CC2C)N3CC3C

Properties
Chemical formula	C_{9}H_{18}N_{3}OP
Molar mass	215.237 g·mol^{−1}
Appearance	Colorless liquid
Boiling point	90 to 92 °C (194 to 198 °F; 363 to 365 K) (0.15-0.3 mmHg)

Hazards
- Lethal dose or concentration (LD, LC)
LD_{50} (median dose)	136 mg/kg (male rat, oral); 213 mg/kg (female rat, oral)
- Except where otherwise noted, data are given for materials in their standard state (at 25 °C [77 °F], 100 kPa). verify (what is ?) Infobox references

Metepa is a chemosterilant, with the capability to restrict ovarian development. Metepa can also result in carcinogenesis, in particular the formation of teratomas. It is a minor ingredient in certain solid rocket propellants.
