= Iraqi Light Armored Vehicle =

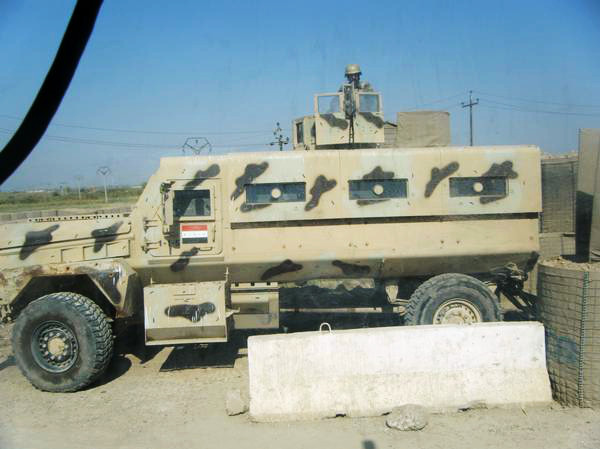
- A MRAP (Iraqi Light Armored Vehicle) in the service of the Iraqi army
- Type: MRAP

Service history
- In service: 2007–Present
- Used by: Iraq, United States
- Wars: Iraq War

Production history
- Manufacturer: BAE Systems, General Dynamics
- No. built: 300+

Specifications
- Mass: 36,000 lbs (16,330 kg)
- Length: 309 in (784 cm)
- Width: 106 in (268 cm) at rear side market lights
- Height: 110 in (280 cm)
- Crew: 2+8
- Armor: Classified
- Secondary armament: Optional firing ports
- Engine: Caterpillar C7 FMM Diesel; 330 hp (246 kW) @ 2400 RPM; 860 ft lbs (1166 nm) torque @ 1440 RPM
- Transmission: Allison 3500 SP series
- Operational range: 350 mi (565 km)
- Maximum speed: 55 mph (89 km/h)

Iraqi Light Armored Vehicle or International Light Armored Vehicle is an armored fighting vehicle based on the Cougar and manufactured by Force Protection Industries, BAE Systems and General Dynamics.

Nicknamed the Badger, The ILAV is based on the Cougar, which can carry ten passengers (the six wheel version can carry sixteen). The Cougar/ILAV vehicle uses a capsule design to protect the passengers and key vehicle components from mines and roadside bombs. The Badger itself costs about US$432,000. Just like other MRAPS, the Badger can be outfitted with a robotic arm for the purpose of investigating possible IEDS and UXOs.

== Operational history ==
=== Iraqi Army ===
The Iraqi Army began to be equipped with the ILAV in 2007 and main user of the ILAV. The Iraqi Army Second Division was one of the first unit to receive the ILAV. Members if the Division stated that the ILAV will help provider improved protection for Soldiers of the Iraqi Army. The Eight Division received two ILAVs and training from the 555th Engineer Brigade in 2008. Current Iraqi Army Engineers are being trained and equipped with the remote controlled arm variants.

=== US Army ===
The ILAV was delivered to Fort Jackson, South Carolina, in 2009 for training against IEDs. The ILAV is planned to be used in "Training the Trainer" program to help new operators safety drive US MRAPs. The Department of Defense currently restricts the use of the ILAV for training only because the armor does not meet DOD requirements to be deployed in field.

== Operators ==
- Iraq In 2007 an order for 378 was placed,+ 865 ordered by 2011.
- United States Fourteen ILAVs were delivered to Fort Jackson for training US Soldiers in the use of MRAPs to prevent roll over accidents.
- Iraqi Kurdistan Peshmerga are operating at least two vehicles as of September 2014.
- Islamic State: captured

== Gallery ==
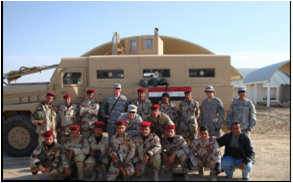
Iraqi Light Armored Vehicle

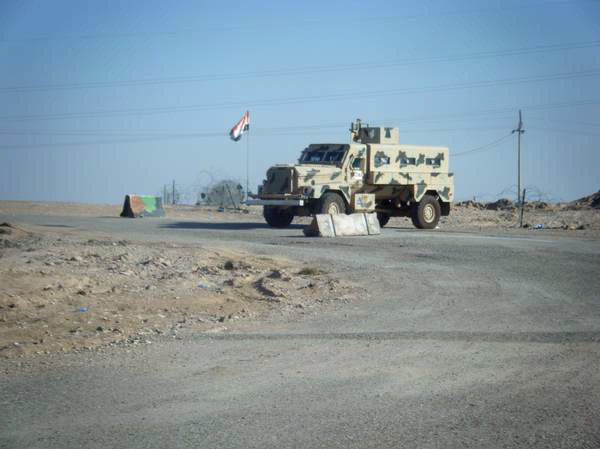
Iraqi Light Armored Vehicle at checkpoint.

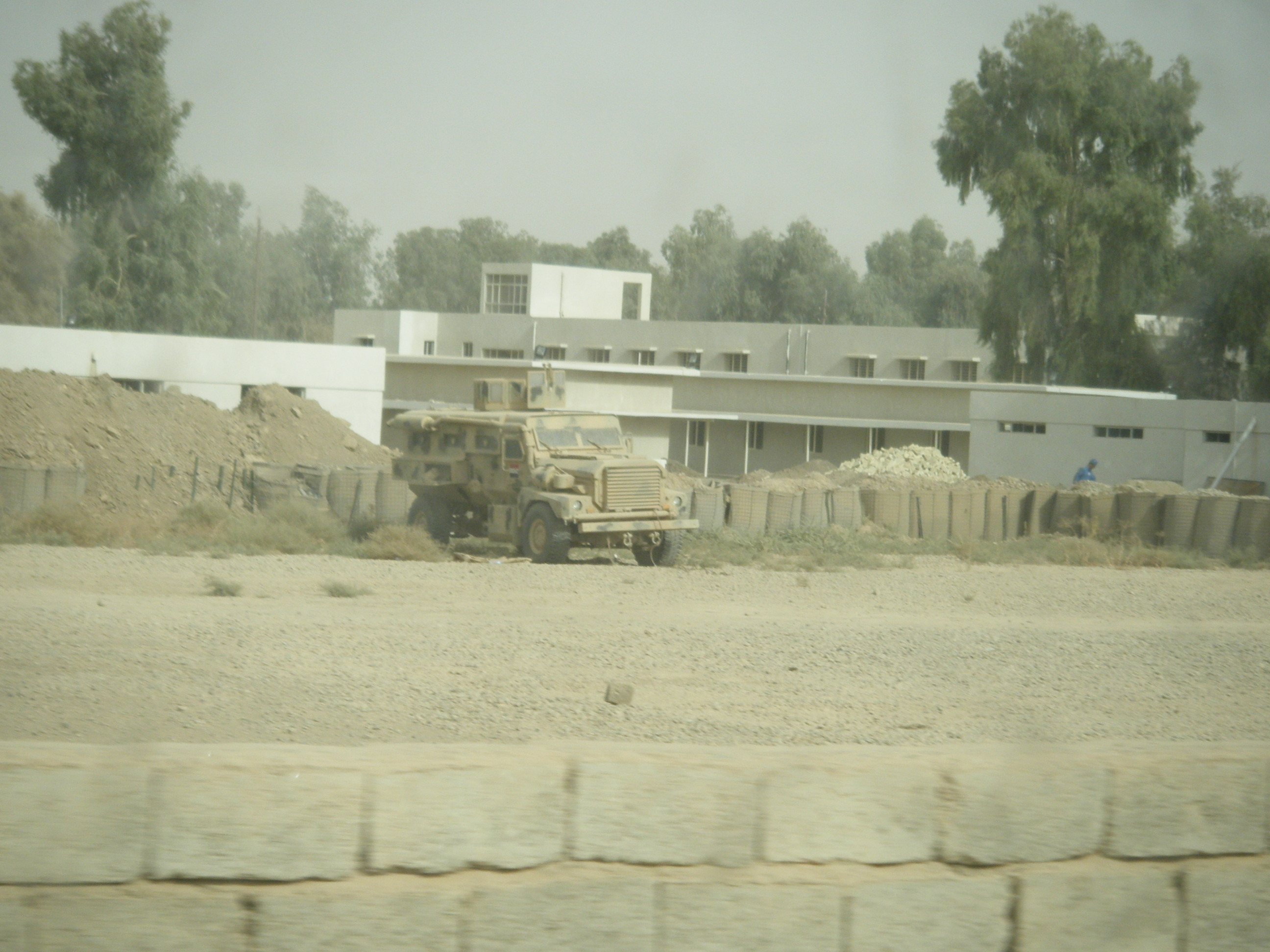
A ILAV at FOB Normandy 2008

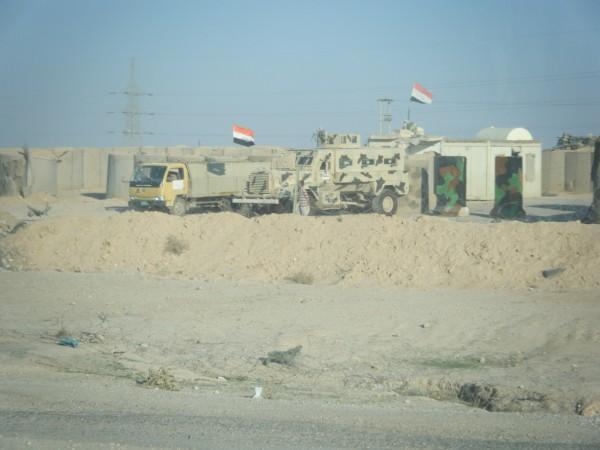
Iraqi Light Armored Vehicle at checkpoint.

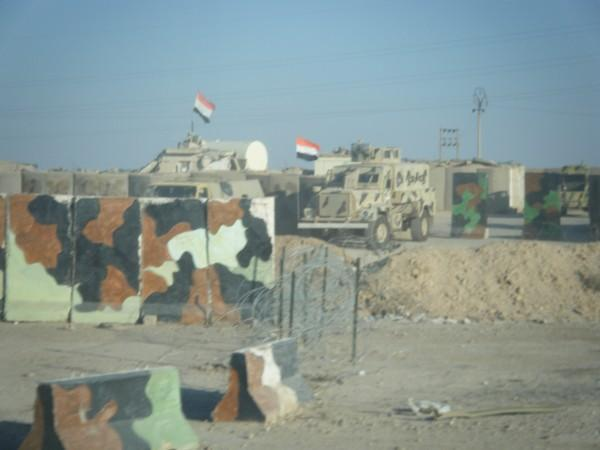
Iraqi Light Armored Vehicle at checkpoint.
