= Military history of Iraq =

The military history of Iraq, due to a rich archaeological record, is one of the longest in written human history. The region of Iraq, which used to be Mesopotamia, has been referred to as the "cradle of civilization", and wars of conquest have been recorded in this region as far back as the third millennium BC. Because of its geopolitical dominance and ideology based in expansionism, the Neo-Assyrian Empire is by many researchers regarded to have been the first empire in history. The area possesses strategic value, initially for the rich, fertile agricultural region in the Mesopotamian plain, and more recently for large petroleum deposits and access to the oil-rich Persian Gulf. The present territory of Iraq lacks significant strategic barriers, making it difficult to defend against foreign invasion.

A study done on the current Iraqi military have shown a decrease in its power beyond the war of 2003. On the other hand Iraq's military at the rule of Saddam Hussain was the greatest military in the Middle East and in the top 10 world wide.

== Mesopotamia ==
- In 2525 BC, there was a battle between King Eannatum of Lagash, and Umma. The battle is recorded on the Stele of the Vultures. The king won the battle by using armored soldiers who were in phalanx formation, and also used chariots pulled by onagers.
- About 2300 BC, Sargon of Akkad attacked and conquered 34 Sumerian cities, beginning the Akkadian Empire.
- The Sumerians living in Iraq had to battle the Elamites from western Iran.
- Kassites attacked Babylonia in the 16th century BC.
- About 1263 BC, the Assyrian king Shalmaneser I defeated a rebellion led by Shattuara II of Hanigalbat.
- Nebuchadnezzar I (1119–1098 BC) attacked Assyria.
- The Chaldeans took over Babylonia in the 9th century BC, forming the Neo-Babylonian Empire, and had to fight many revolts and aggressors.
- King Esarhaddon (681–669) conquered Elam in western Persia.
- Nebuchadrezzar II (605–562 BC) conquered Jerusalem taking 15,000 Jewish captives, who were put into exile for 70 years (see Babylonian captivity).
- Cyrus the Great, founder of the Achaemenid Persian Empire, defeated the Neo-Babylonian Empire and conquered the region in 539–538 BC.
- In 331 BC, Alexander the Great defeated Darius III of Persia at the Battle of Gaugamela, east of present-day Mosul. Alexander died in Babylon in 323 BC.
- In later centuries, starting from 190 BC, the Persians ruled Iraq for hundreds of years under different dynasties including the Parthian and Sassanid dynasties, after the first conquest in the 6th century BC.
- In 627 AD, the Byzantines sacked Ctesiphon, which was invaded again in 637, this time by Muslim Arabs. The battle between 18,000 Arab tribesmen led by General Khalid ibn al-Walid (The Sword of Allah) and the Persians led by Rostam Farrokhzād, was fought at the Battle of al-Qādisiyyah, south of Baghdad.
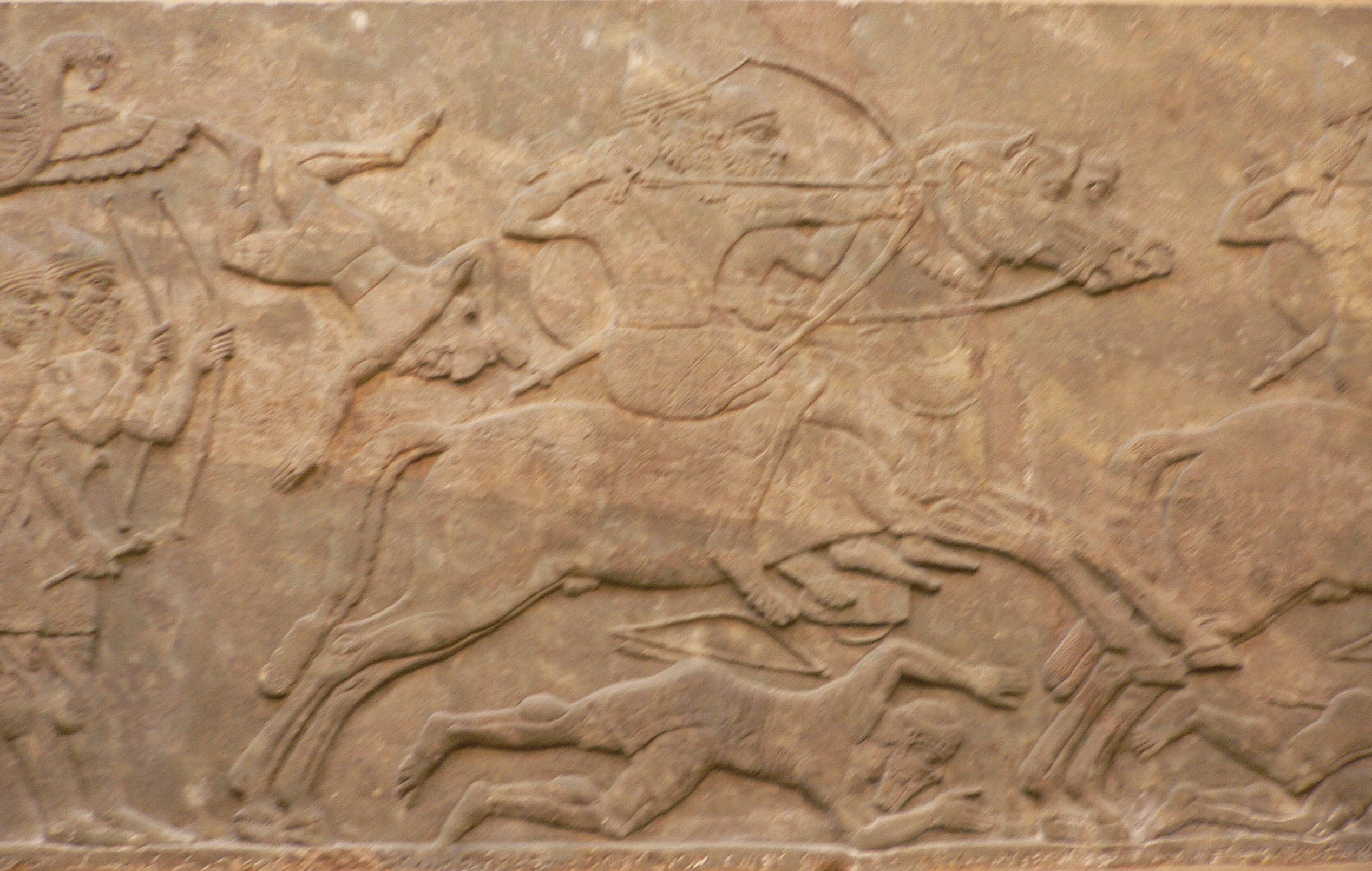
  Assyrian cavalry
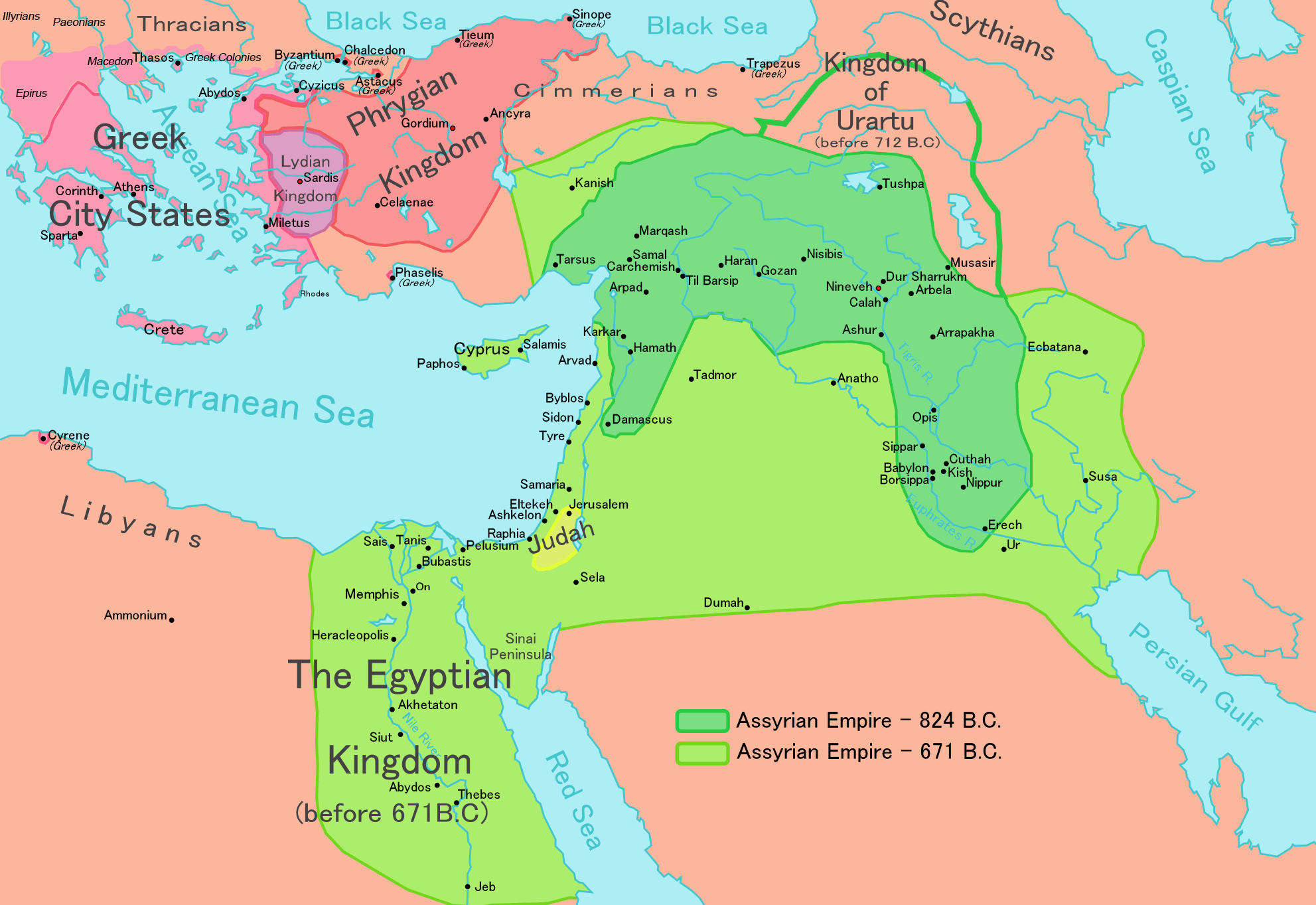
  The Assyrian Empire at its greatest extent
  Standard of Ur
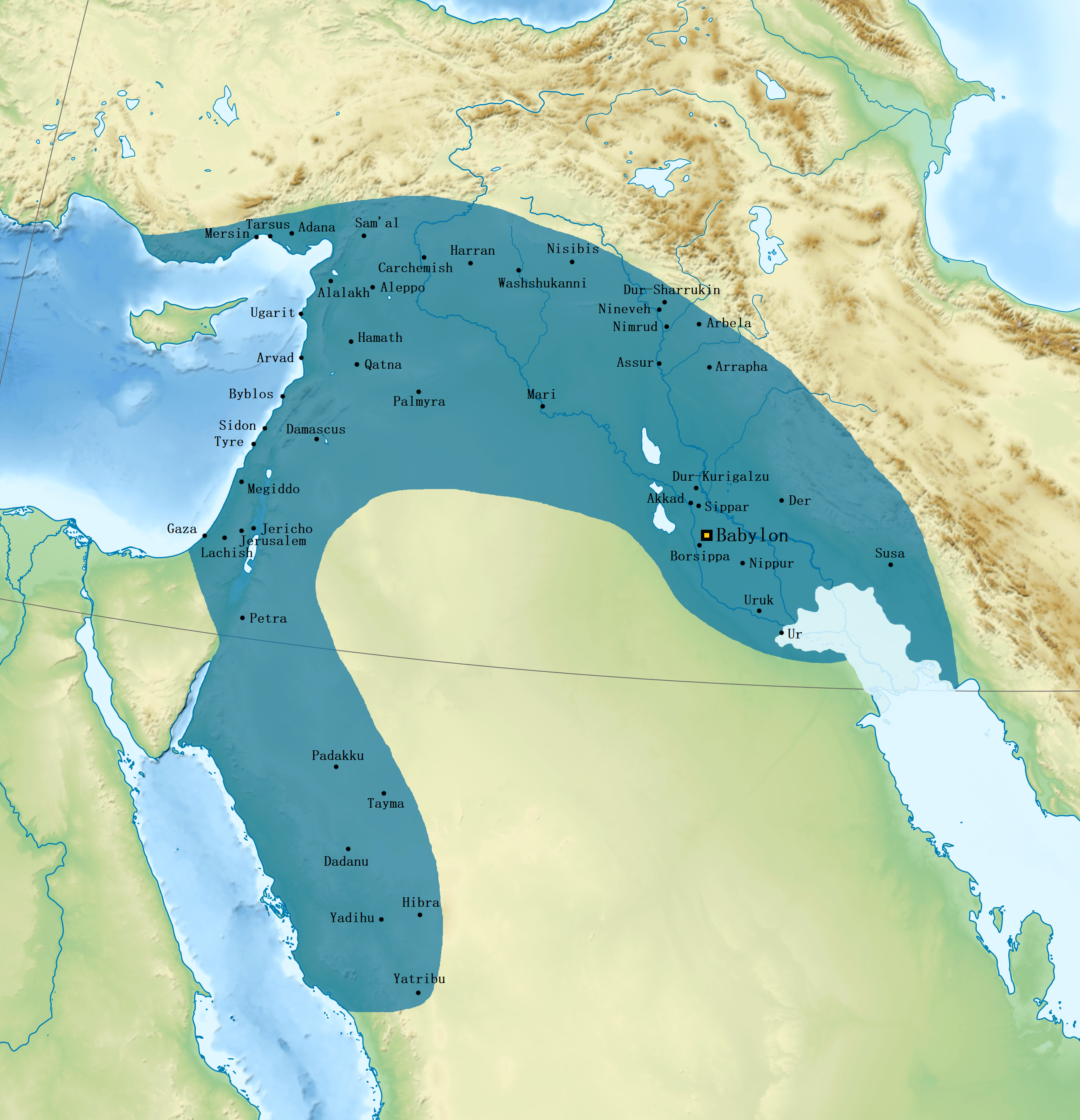
  The Neo-Babylonian Empire at its greatest extent

== Middle Ages (634–16th century) ==
- Muslim Arab forces led by Khalid ibn al-Walid and Sa`d ibn Abī Waqqās conquered Mesopotamia, which itself was controlled by the Sassanid Persian Empire during the Islamic conquest of Persia in the 7th century.
- In 680, Hussein bin Ali, the grandson of the Islamic prophet Muhammad, was killed in the Battle of Karbala on the day of Aashurah.
- In 701, a revolt by Ibn Ash'ath was crushed by Syrian armies.
- Around 747, the Abbasid Revolution led to the Abbasid caliphate being proclaimed in 750. The city of Baghdad was founded in 762 and became the center of the caliphate.
- Baghdad was sacked during the Fourth Fitna around 811.
- By 865, the Abbasid civil war (865–866) resulted in rival capitals in Samarra and Baghdad.
- In 927–928, the Qarmatians of Bahrayn invaded and raided much of Iraq.
- In 945, the Buyid dynasty from the Caspian Sea took over Baghdad, with the Abbasid caliphs becoming puppet rulers.
- Mosul was captured in 977.
- In 1055, the Seljuk leader Togrul Beg overran the central area of Iraq.
- The Abbasids regained control in 1135.
- Baghdad repelled an attack by the Mongols in 1245.

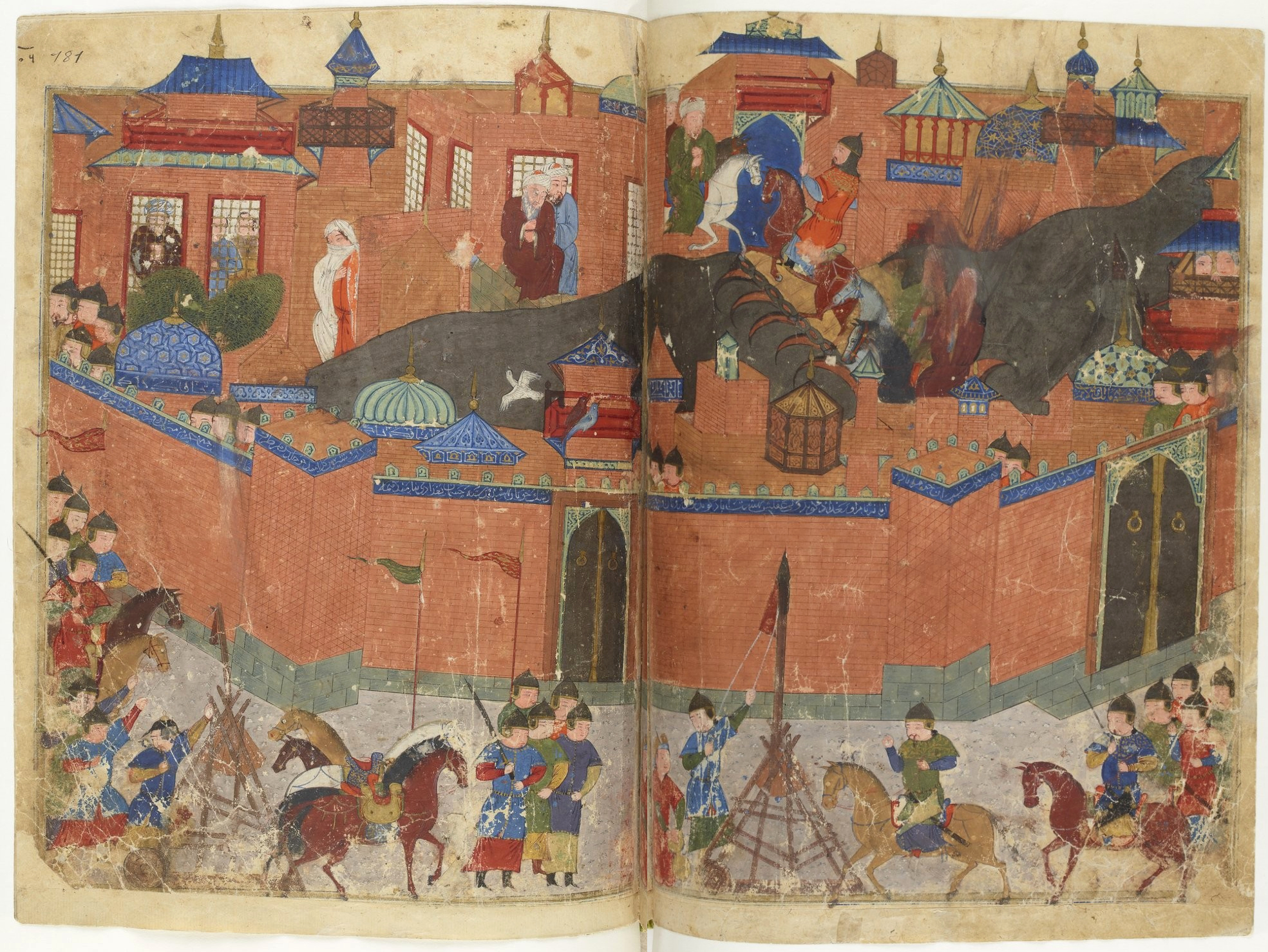
Siege of Baghdad 1258

- Baghdad was sacked on February 10, 1258, by Hulagu Khan following the Siege of Baghdad (1258), with between 250,000 and 800,000 people killed during the Mongol invasion.
- Baghdad was sacked again in 1401 by Tamerlane.
- From 1405 Turkish tribes from Anatolia took over Iraq and there was much infighting between themselves, and against local groups. The Black Sheep Turkmen at first ruled Iraq until 1466 when the White Sheep Turkmen took control.
- Around 1508, Iraq was conquered by the Safavid dynasty of Iran.
- From around 1533–1534, Iraq was conquered by the Ottoman Empire.

== Ottoman rule (16th century–World War I) ==
- Baghdad was put under Persian rule between 1623 and 1638, when Murad IV restored Ottoman rule and massacred many local Shiites.
- In 1776, Basra was occupied by the Persians. They held it until 1779 when Karim Khan Zand's death precipitated a period of internal disorder and resulted in withdrawal from Basra.

== British Mandate of Mesopotamia (1918–1932) ==
- The British invaded Iraq during World War I in the Mesopotamian Campaign. They invaded southern Mesopotamia in November 1914. The Battle of Ctesiphon was fought in November 1915. The undermanned and overstretched British forces were defeated by the Turks, who besieged the British in the city of Kut-al-Amara for 143 days in the Siege of Kut, ending with a British surrender, with 10,000 men becoming prisoners in April 1916. The British took the middle eastern campaign more seriously following this defeat, transferring command from India to the main British command, and General Frederick Stanley Maude was put in charge of British forces, leading the British to a series of victories. The battles of Mohammed Abdul Hassan, Hai and Dahra were won by the British in January 1917. In February, they recaptured Kut. On March 11, 1917, the British occupied Baghdad after the Fall of Baghdad (1917).
- Between 1920 and 1922, the British put down an Iraqi revolt costing them 40 million pounds to do so.
- In January 1921, the Royal Air Force's Mesopotamian Group was formed by raising Mesopotamian Wing to group status.
- On 1 October 1922, Mesopotamian Group was absorbed into the newly formed RAF Iraq Command which was given control of all British forces in Iraq.
- Faisal I, leader of Iraq from 1921 to 1933, helped to make his country fully independent in 1932.

== Post-colonial monarchy (1932–1958) ==
In 1933, the Iraqi Army under the leadership of Bakr Sidqi kills anywhere from 3-6000 Assyrians during the Simele massacre. The massacre lasted for at least a week-long period.

On 1 April 1941, Rashid Ali and four generals overthrew the pro-British Iraqi government. The British were concerned that the Axis powers might get involved in Iraq since the new government was pro-Axis. The British landed troops at Basra while Iraqi forces besieged RAF Habbaniya.

On 2 May, the British launched pre-emptive air strikes against Iraqi forces. On 7 May, the Iraqis abandoned the positions above RAF Habbaniya. By about 11 May, the Iraqi Air Force was neutralized. From about 13 May, the "Flyer Command Iraq" (Fliegerführer Irak) of the German Air Force (Luftwaffe) started to arrive. The aircraft of Fliegerführer Irak started to fly sorties under Iraqi colours from Mosul against the British and Commonwealth forces. For a variety of reasons, Fliegerführer Irak was able to achieve little in the way of results. British ground forces from RAF Habbaniya attacked Iraqi forces in Fallujah and, by 22 May, had withstood an Iraqi counter-attack. The British forces then attacked Baghdad, Rashid Ali and his government fled, and an armistice was signed on 31 May.

The pro-British Iraqi government was restored and the Kingdom of Iraq declared war on the Axis on 16 January 1943.

The Iraqi Army participated in the 1948 Arab–Israeli War against Israel.

== Early republic (1958–1963) ==
The US began military aid to Iraq in 1954, and Iraq joined the pro western Baghdad Pact in 1955.

A garrison in Mosul rebelled against Qassem, and Kurdish leader Barzani returned from exile in the Soviet Union to suppress them. Iraq claimed sovereignty over Kuwait after it gained independence from Britain in 1961, but it backed down after the British sent troops to Kuwait.

Iraq sent troops and planes to Jordan during the 1967 Arab-Israeli war (the Six-Day War).

== Ba'ath Party (1968–2003) ==
=== Ahmed Hassan al-Bakr (1968–1979) ===
Iraq sent an expeditionary force to fight beside the Syrians and Jordanians in the 1973 October War against Israel. This force was composed of:

- 2 armoured divisions;
- 2 infantry brigades;
- 1 special forces brigade;
- 12 artillery battalions.

The expeditionary force operated southwest of Damascus with 60,000 men, 700 T-55 tanks, 500 APCs (mostly OT-62 TOPAS and M113) and over 200 artillery pieces. The two armoured divisions were the 3rd and the 6th. The 3rd Armoured Division, the Salah ad-Din forces, was the elite of the army, and Iraqi officers avidly competed to be assigned to it.

Abu Tahsin al-Salihi, later dubbed "The Sheikh of Snipers" in the war against ISIS, claimed to be deployed with the expeditionary force in a brigade.

=== Saddam Hussein (1979–2003) ===
Saddam Hussein came to power as President of Iraq on July 16, 1979.

After months of provocations and shelling of Iraqi towns and villages on the border with Iran by the newly established Ayatollah regime in Iran, Iraq responded on 22 September 1980 and achieved success in stopping the shelling of its border towns and villages. The Iran–Iraq dragged on into a long war, with between 1 and 2 million casualties. The war ended with a ceasefire on August 20, 1988 and the Iraqi military came out of it as one of the powerful military in the region.

On June 7, 1981, Israeli F-15s and F-16s bombed and destroyed the Osirak nuclear reactor, 18 miles (29 km) south of Baghdad following the orders of Israeli Prime Minister Menachem Begin.

On May 17, 1987, an Iraqi Mirage fighter fired two Exocet missiles at the American ship USS Stark (FFG-31), killing thirty-seven of the crew.

==== Gulf War ====
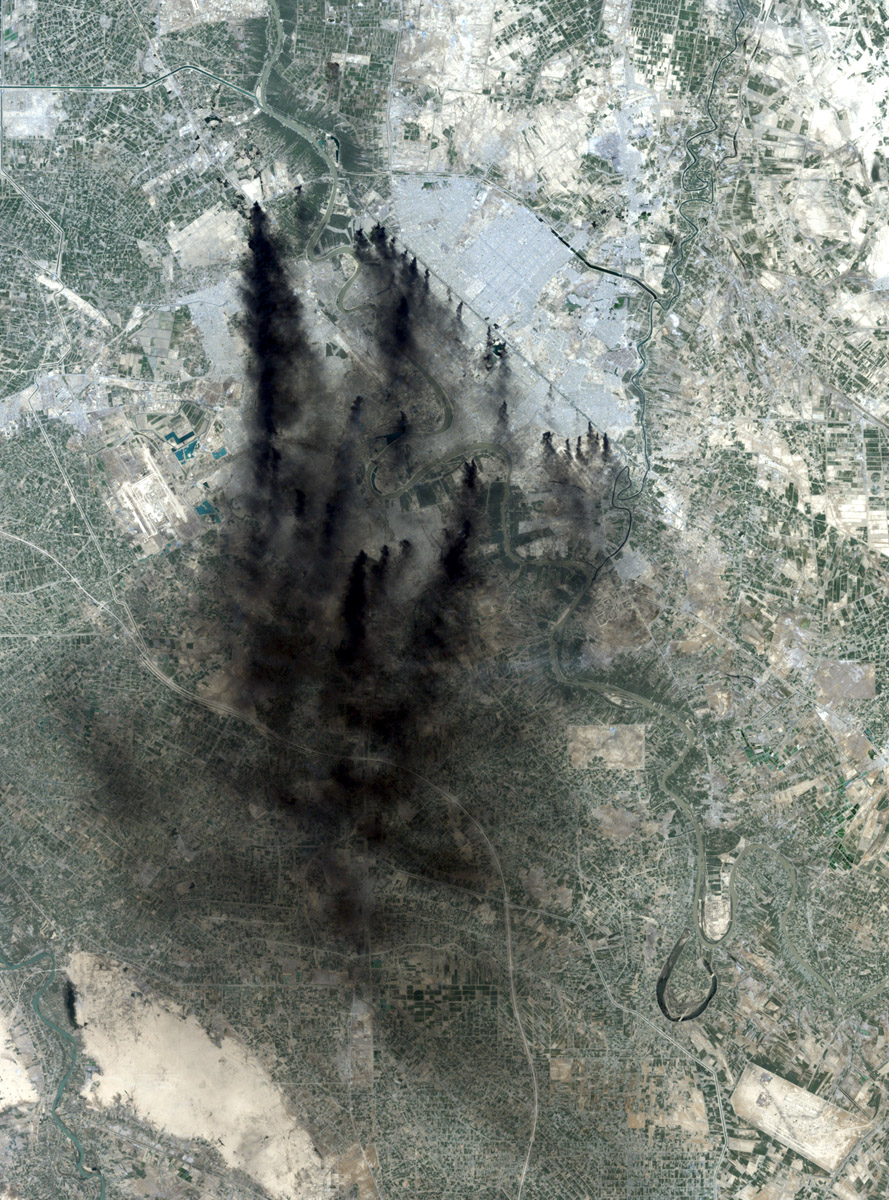
Oil filled trenches set on fire in Baghdad on April 2, by the Iraqis to try to hinder Allied air strikes

On August 2, 1990, Iraq invaded and annexed Kuwait. The United States led an international coalition which heavily bombed Iraq and freed Kuwait in 1991. After this war, sanctions were imposed on Iraq as well as a north and south no fly zones, and during the 1990s, Iraq was frequently bombed by American and British aircraft in small sorties.

In January 1993, the US launched a cruise missile attack against Iraq, because of it not dismantling police posts near the border with Kuwait. In June 1993, another US cruise missile attack was launched because of a suspected assassination plot against former US president George H. W. Bush. In 1996, Iraqi troops moved into northern Iraq to support the Kurdish Democratic Party against the Patriotic Union of Kurdistan. The US responded with limited air attacks in the south. There were Iraqi attacks against allied aircraft in the no fly zones in January 2001, with American and British responding with bombing of targets in northern Iraq in February.

=== Defense industry under Saddam Hussein ===
Under Saddam Hussein's presidency, Iraq had constructed state-of-the-art production facilities for the rocket propellant at Hillah, south of Baghdad, and assembled the missiles at Falluja, west of the Iraqi capital. At the time, Iraq was believed to be way ahead of its then rival Iran's arms producing industry. The Iraqis were producing a surface-to-surface missile with a 400-mile range known as the Al Hussein, a variant of the Soviet Scud missile. They fired dozens of these missiles into Tehran in the late stages of their war with Iran during the so-called "War of the Cities." The Iraqis were believed to have the best stocks of rocket artillery in the developing world. They were producing a rocket with a 35-mile range modelled on the Brazilian Astros 2, a copy of the Soviet FROG-7, and their own 55-mile-range Laith rocket that was reportedly capable of carrying a chemical warhead. The Iraqis were also building a 30-mile-range surface-to-surface rocket known as the Ababil, which was designed to carry a sophisticated cluster-bomb warhead. Iraq had embarked upon an undertaking known as Project 395, a $400-million program to produce solid-fuel surface-to-surface ballistic missiles. Notable ballistic missiles of Iraq produced under Saddam were Al Hussein, Ababil, Al-Samoud 2, Al Hijarah, and Al-Fahd. Other uncompleted or abandoned ballistic missile projects included Badr 2000, Al-Abbas, and Al-Tammuz.

Other Iraqi munitions projects included Lion of Babylon tank, infrared and television-guided bombs and laser-guided missiles. Iraq was working on advanced naval mines and unmanned aerial vehicles for battlefield surveillance. They had also developed indigenous airborne radar surveillance aircraft. The Baghdad-1 and Baghdad-2 aircraft were Iraqi developments (with French assistance) of the Ilyushin IL-76. They had fibreglass-reinforced plastic radome over the antenna of the Thomson-CSF Tiger G surveillance radar with a maximum detection range of 350 km (190 nmi; 220 mi). One was destroyed on the ground during the 1991 Gulf War; two others were flown to Iran where they remained.

Also under President Saddam Hussein, Project Babylon was launched to build a series of "superguns".

Other notable weapons of Iraq produced under Saddam Hussein included the Tabuk Sniper Rifle, and the Al-Fao self-propelled artillery system. At sea the Iraqis built the LUGM-145 naval moored contact mine.

There was an Iraqi biological weapons program (not to be confused with Iraqi chemical weapons program) under Saddam Hussein until the end of 1991 Gulf War. By the time Iraqis were testing biological warheads (containing anthrax and botulinum toxin) in Iraq's deserts, the 1980 to 1988 Iran–Iraq war had come to an end. In December 1990 the Iraqis had filled 100 R-400 bombs with botulinum toxin, 50 with anthrax, and 16 with aflatoxin. In addition, 13 Al Hussein missile warheads were filled with botulinum toxin, 10 with anthrax, and 2 with aflatoxin. These weapons were deployed in January 1991 to four locations for use against the U.S. forces only as "weapons of last resort" in case they stormed the gates of Baghdad. Since this never happened in 1991, Saddam found their use unnecessary. Iraq destroyed its biological arsenal after the 1991 war.

The International Institute for Strategic Studies (IISS) in Britain published in September 2002 a review of Iraq's military capability, and concluded that Iraq could assemble nuclear weapons within months if fissile material from foreign sources were obtained. Dr. Mahdi Obeidi, who created Saddam's nuclear centrifuge program that had successfully enriched uranium to weapons grade before the 1991 Gulf War, stated in an op-ed in The New York Times that although Iraqi scientists possessed the knowledge to restart the nuclear program, by 2002 the idea had become "a vague dream from another era." Iraqi scientists under Saddam Hussein included Nassir al-Hindawi, Rihab al-Taha and Huda Salih Mahdi Ammash as weapons designers.

== Invasion of Iraq ==
Unit Insignia of the U.S. Army Element of Multinational Force consisting of lammasu, a human-head winged bull of Mesopotamia

The United States led a "coalition of the willing" which invaded Iraq on March 20, 2003, in a war that took three weeks to get control of the country, yet the fighting lasted much longer. Baghdad was captured on April 9. Saddam Hussein was deposed, but remained in hiding until December 14, 2003, when he was captured by the US, tried by an Iraqi court, and executed in accordance with the court's death sentence.

== Interim government (2003–2008) ==
Iraq rebuilt its military with the aid of countries from the Coalition of the Willing (see Military of Iraq). The effort to create a new national military was complicated by focused insurgent attacks on recruitment centers and claims of insurgents' infiltration of the new forces. Saddam Hussein was executed on December 30, 2006, after a court appointed by the interim government found him guilty of ordering the deaths of the inhabitants of an Iraqi village almost 10 years earlier.

== See also ==
- List of wars involving Iraq
- History of Iraq
- Military of Iraq
