= R-17 Elbrus =

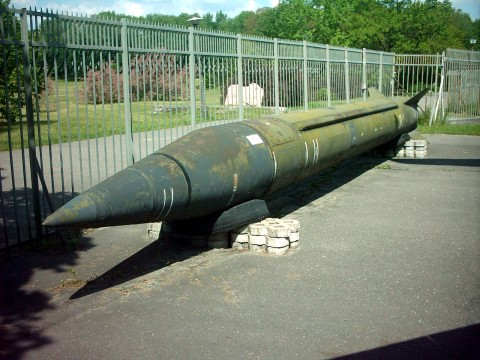
- An R-17 missile at the Muzeum Uzbrojenia (Museum of Armament), Poznań, Poland (2004)
- Type: Short-range ballistic missile
- Place of origin: Soviet Union

Service history
- In service: 1962−present
- Used by: See operators
- Wars: Yom Kippur War; Iran-Iraq War; Soviet-Afghan War; Gulf War; Yemeni civil war (1994); Libyan civil war; Syrian civil war; Yemeni civil war (2014–present); 2020 Nagorno-Karabakh conflict

Production history
- Designer: Viktor Makeyev
- Designed: 1958−1961
- Manufacturer: Votkinsk Machine Building Plant
- Unit cost: US$1,000,000 (equivalent to US$2,722,285 in 2025)
- Produced: 1959−1987
- No. built: 7,000−10,000 (est.)
- Variants: See variants

Specifications
- Mass: 5,682–5,950 kg (12,527–13,118 lb)
- Length: 11.2−11.4 m (37 ft)
- Diameter: 885 mm (34.8 in)
- Wingspan: 1,800 mm (71 in)
- Crew: 7
- Maximum firing range: 300 km (190 mi)
- Warhead: HE, cluster, chemical, nuclear
- Engine: Isayev/KBKhM 9D21 liquid (missile); D-12-525A diesel (TEL)
- Ground clearance: 440 mm (17 in)
- Propellant: TM-185 (kerosene derivative) / AK-27I (27% N_{2}O_{4} 73% HNO_{3})
- Operational range: 450 km (280 mi) (full load)
- Maximum speed: 45 km/h (28 mph)
- Accuracy: 450–900 m (490–980 yd) CEP
- Launch platform: 9P117M TEL

The R-17 Elbrus (Russian: Р-17, 9К72 «Эльбрус», named for Mount Elbrus), GRAU index 9K72 is a tactical ballistic missile, initially developed by the Soviet Union. It is also known by its NATO reporting name SS-1C Scud-B. The R-17 is one of several Soviet missiles to carry the reporting name Scud, and the most prolifically launched of the series, with a production run estimated at 7,000 (1960–1987). Also designated R-300 during the 1970s, the R-17 was derived from the R-11 Zemlya. It has been operated by 32 countries and manufactured in four countries outside the Soviet Union. It is still in service with some. The North Koreans reverse-engineered it as the Hwasong-5.

== History ==
The first mock-up was designed and built by Makeyev in 1958–1959, before the programme was transferred to the Votkinsk Machine Building Plant in 1959 for mass production. The first launch was conducted in 1961, and it entered service in 1962, mounted on the 2P19 tracked transporter erector launcher (TEL).

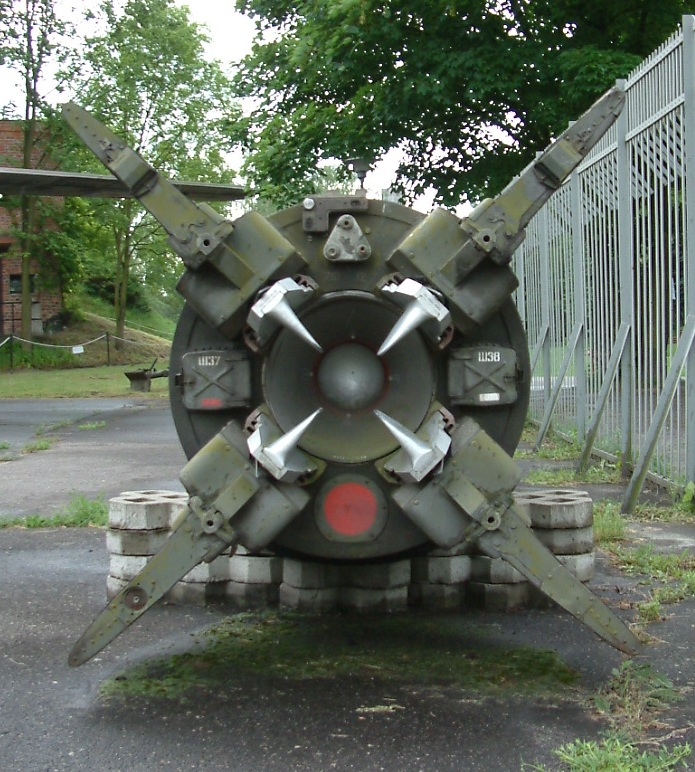
The rear section of an 8K14 missile, showing the fixed fins and the graphite vanes that control the missile's path.

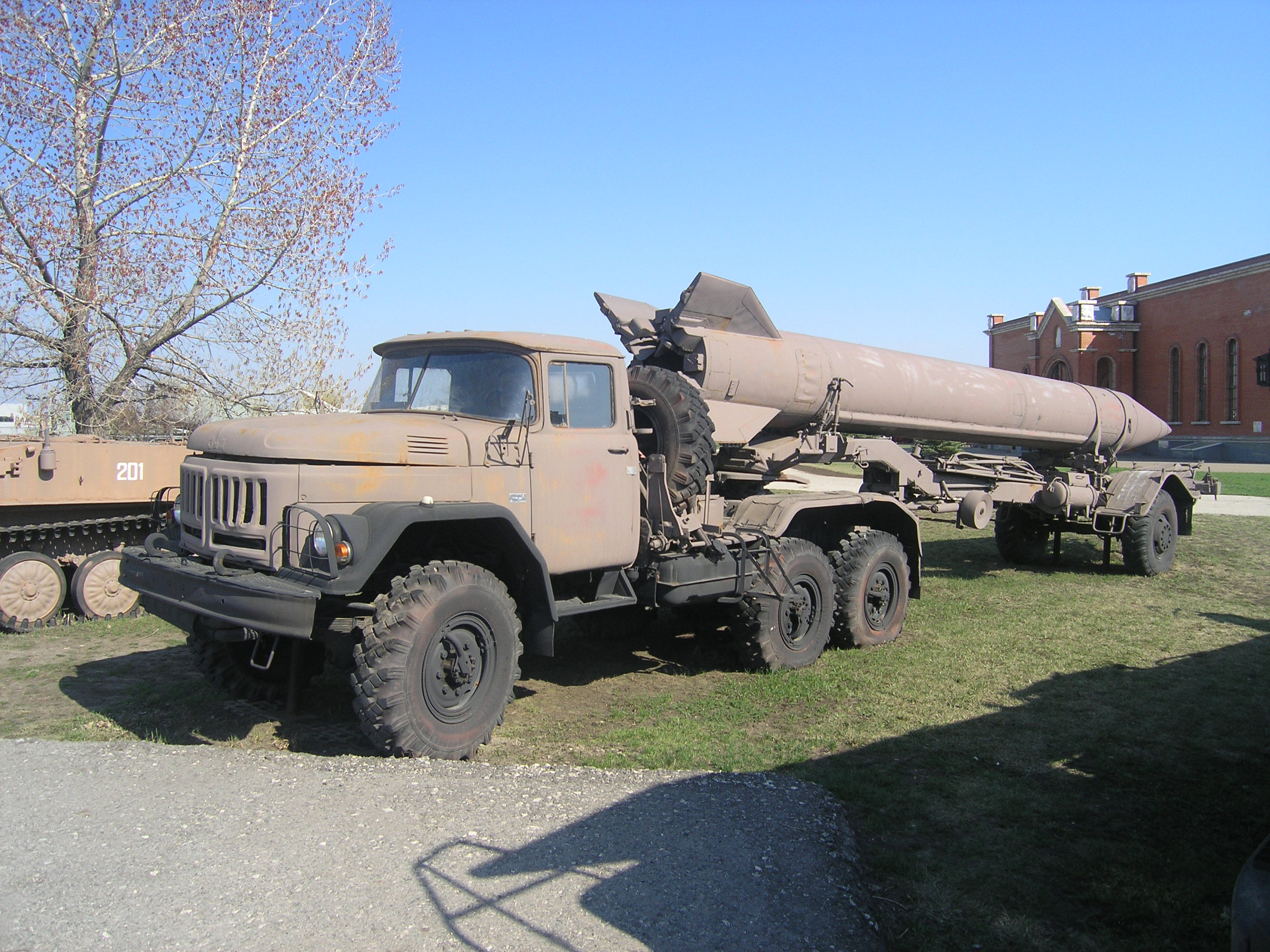
R-17 on reload transport trailer with ZIL-131 tractor

During the 1960s the Soviets exported the R-17 missiles and 2P19 launchers to Warsaw Pact allies, though none of their armies had access to nuclear warheads, which were stored on their soil in Soviet-controlled Missile Technical Bases (RTB). After the 9P117 TEL was introduced, Warsaw Pact R-17 brigades were re-equipped with these. About 140 TELs were exported to Poland, East Germany, Czechoslovakia, Hungary, Romania, and Bulgaria. Most of their R-17 brigades were disbanded in the 1990s as their equipment was wearing out and ineffective without a nuclear warhead.

The Soviet Union made little effort to export R-17 systems outside of the Warsaw Pact, since it was complex, expensive, and not militarily effective without a nuclear warhead, but several Middle Eastern countries showed interest in obtaining some systems, partly for propaganda purposes, giving their militaries a veneer of modernity and partly for the possibility of carrying deep strikes inside Israel, since their air forces proved to be incapable of conducting ground attack missions when faced against the better-trained Israeli Air Force.

The exact number of systems exported is not known, with one Russian account stating that 2,300 missiles were sold to 11 countries through 1989, while Zaloga states that Warsaw Pact inventories had over 1,000 missiles, and more than 3,000 were exported to the Middle East and Afghanistan between 1970 and 1990.

Faced with the Soviets refusal to supply R-17 missiles, the North Koreans set up a rogue production line with Egyptian assistance, locally producing it as the Hwasong-5.

According to a 1988 CIA report, Egypt have probably assembled Hwasong-5 missiles locally from knock-down kits, though its unknown if their efforts to build them locally were successful. Iran have also locally assembled Hwasong-5s, giving them the local designation of Shahab-1. Syria have also locally produced R-17 and R-17M with North Korean and Iranian assistance. Prior to the Syrian civil war, it was estimated that Syria was capable of building 30 R-17 missiles per year, under the designation Golan-1 and Golan-2.

== Design ==
The R-17 featured important improvements over the R-11. The Isayev RD-21 engine used a combination of inhibited red fuming nitric acid (IRFNA) oxidiser and unsymmetrical dimethylhydrazine (UDMH) fuel, fed into the combustion chamber by fuel pumps that ensured a more consistent thrust. The guidance system, active only during the boosted phase, uses three gyroscopes, that give it a Circular Error Probable (CEP) of 450 m (490 yd) (900 m (980 yd) according to western sources). A nuclear warhead was designed for the R-17, with a selectable yield, from 5 to 70 kilotons. However it could also carry a chemical warhead, containing 555 kg (1,224 lb) of viscous VX; a conventional weapon, with a single high explosive warhead; or a series of fragmentation payloads, using either high explosive, anti-tank or anti-runway munitions.

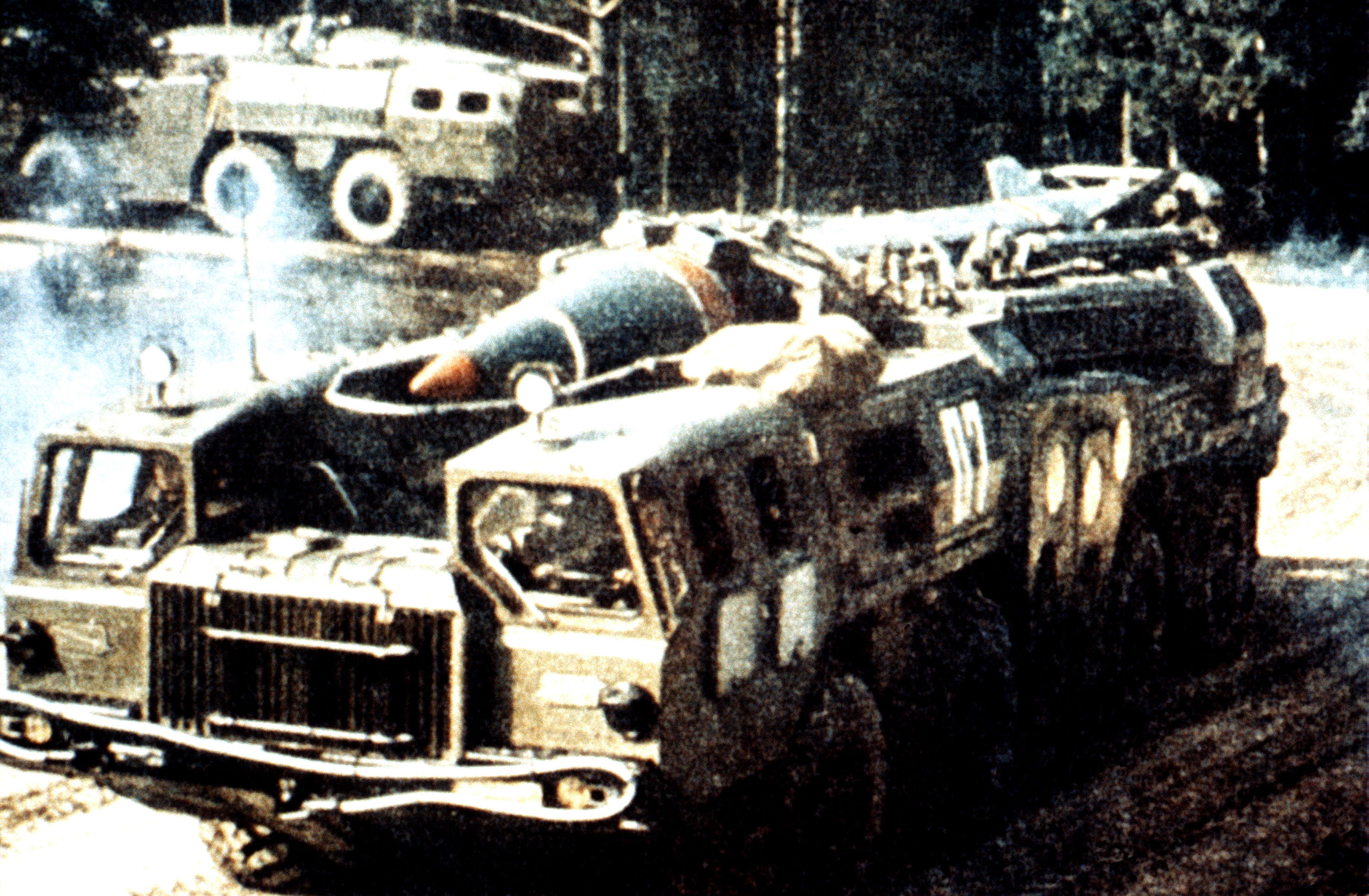
MAZ-543 Uragan carrying a 9K72 Elbrus

At first, the R-17 was carried on a tracked TEL, designated 2P19, which was derived from the 8U218 TEL for the R-11 but with an enlarged missile support structure to accommodate the longer and heavier missile, and additional compressed air cylinders on either side of the vehicle superstructure. In use vibrations from the tracked chassis could interfere with sensitive launch electronics in both the vehicle and the missile itself, causing reliability issues. Production of this model was halted after Khrushchev cancelled the production of heavy tanks (and thus the ISU-152K from which the 8U218 and subsequently 2P19 were derived) in 1962, and a wheeled launcher was designed by the Titan Central Design Bureau, becoming operational in 1967. The new MAZ-543 vehicle was officially designated 9P117 Uragan, and its Russian crews nicknamed it Kashalot (sperm whale), because of its size. The eight-wheeled MAZ-543 has a loaded weight of 37,400 kg, a road speed of 55 km/h and a range of 650 km. It can carry out the launch sequence autonomously, but this is usually directed from a separate command vehicle. The missile is raised to a vertical position by means of hydraulically powered cranes, which usually takes four minutes, while the total sequence lasts about one hour.

== Organization ==
During the early 1960s R-17 missile brigades were deployed at front level with two brigades with a total of nine launchers and at army level with one brigade per army with six launchers each. Due to the complexity of early launchers, each brigade had a strength of about 3,500 men plus 700 assorted vehicles. A R-17 brigade included a headquarters and staff, two launch battalions (with about 745 men plus 265 vehicles and motorcycles), a technical battery, meteorological battery, repair battery, supply battery, engineer vehicle company, chemical defense platoon, and medical platoon.

A R-17 battery originally included six 2P19 launchers, eight 2T3 missile trailers, three 9F21 nuclear warhead shelter trucks, ten command vehicles, six UAZ-452 survey vehicles, four 8T210 crane vehicles, three 8G1 fuel trucks and four 8G17 oxidizer trucks. Following the introduction of the TR-1 Temp to front level service, most R-17 brigades were reassigned to support combined-arms armies. By 1967, R-17 brigades had about 1,200 men and 12 launchers each, thanks to the introduction of the simpler 9P117 TEL and improved handling equipment. In the late 1970s and early 1980s some R-17 brigades assigned to the border with NATO had an additional battery included per battalion, increasing the total number of launchers to 18. After one of these brigades was disbanded in 1979, its launchers were reassigned to other two brigades in East Germany, creating two brigades with 27 launchers (featuring 3 battalions with 9 launchers each). Prior to the dissolution of the Soviet Union in 1991, the Soviet Army had a total of 35 R-17 brigades with approximately 450 launchers.

== Variants ==
=== Soviet Union ===
- R-17 − Original version with a 270 km (170 mi) effective range, it used the AK-20I oxidant and TG-02 Tonka fuel.
- R-17M − Improved version, it uses a more energetic fuel (a combination of the AK-27I oxidant with TM-185 fuel) and other changes increasing maximum range to 300 km (190 mi). In the 1970s, the R-17M was further improved with specially lined fuel tanks, allowing the missiles to be stored, fully fueled for up to 90 days.
- Extended range R-17M − First tested in Kapustin Yar test range in 1965, it could reach 500–600 km (310–370 mi), but with poorer accuracy. Additionally, the missile performance was similar to the 9M76 Temp already in service, apparently preventing it from entering service with the Soviet Army. US intelligence initially designated it as the KY-3, but later called the SS-1D Scud-C.
- R-17E − Export version, it carries the 8F44F high-explosive warhead. When launched at the maximum 300 km range, it impacts at a speed of 1.4 km/s (0.87 mi/s), while the explosion usually leaves a crater 1.5–4 m (4 ft 11 in – 13 ft 1 in) deep and 12 m (39 ft) wide.

=== North Korea ===
- Hwasong-5 − Reverse-engineered version developed with Egyptian assistance. Produced locally by Iran and Syria.
- Hwasong-6 − Improved version of the Hwasong-5 with range extended from 330 km (210 mi) to 500 km (310 mi)

=== Iraq ===
- Al-Husayn − Named after Husayn ibn Ali, it was a modified R-17E with a smaller warhead and enlarged fuel tanks increasing maximum range to 650 km (400 mi).
- Al-Abbas − Extended range variant with a maximum range of 860 km (530 mi).
- Al-Hijarah − Variant with a concrete warhead intended to penetrate hardened Iranian or Israeli targets.

== Combat use ==
=== Afghanistan ===
The most extensive use of the R-17 took place during the final phase of the Soviet-Afghan war. When the Soviets began their withdrawal from the country in May 1988, the Afghan Army received R-17E missiles as a substitute for the Soviet airpower. While the Afghan R-17 were nominally assigned to the 99th Missile Brigade in Afshur, in reality they were mostly operated by Soviet personnel with Afghans being gradually integrated into the unit. They were used against the Afghan mujahideen ammunition dumps near the Pakistan border and during the successful defense of Jalalabad, where 438 R-17 missiles were launched in total.

Through October 1989, another 995 R-17 missiles were launched against the Mujahideen. As the Soviets concluded their withdrawal and the country descended into protracted civil war, the number of R-17 launches declined. By May 1991, the 99th Missile Brigade had fired 1,554 of the approximately 1,700 R-17 missiles received. On 24 April 1992, the mujahideen forces of Ahmad Shah Massoud captured the Afshur military base alongside most its remaining R-17 missiles (about 50 missiles) and launchers. Other mujahideen factions also captured a few missiles and TELs, but they couldn't launch them without the help of former 99th Missile Brigade personnel. During the Afghan civil war, about 44 missiles were fired between April 1991 and spring 1996 by several factions in various battles. The Taliban managed to capture part of the surviving stockpile during the fighting in the late 1990s, but due the poor state of the equipment and lack of trained personnel, only five missiles were fired after the summer of 1996. Following the United States invasion of Afghanistan in 2001, the remaining four functional launchers were scrapped in the Panjshir Valley in January 2005.

=== Armenia ===
During the 2020 Nagorno-Karabakh conflict, the Armenians reportedly fired R-17 and Tochka missiles on the city of Ganja, Azerbaijan. Analysts of the Center for Strategic and International Studies noted that Armenia probably used their Soviet-era R-17 and Tochka missiles to conserve their small stockpile of the more advanced Iskander missiles and to avoid escalating the conflict beyond the Nagorno-Karabakh region. They also noted that both Armenia and Azerbaijan could hit most targets in the region with long-range rocket artillery, limiting the tactical value of using expensive ballistic missiles.

=== Egypt ===
Egypt received nine TELs and about 18 R-17E missiles in 1973, shortly before the beginning of the Yom Kippur War. They were assigned to the 65th Artillery Brigade, attached to the Third Army at the time. Anwar Sadat threatened to fire R-17 missiles at Israeli cities, but when Israel placed its nuclear Jericho missiles in plain view of Soviet reconnaissance satellites, the Soviets forced Sadat to reconsider. The 65th Artillery Brigade would later fire three of these missiles (with the help of Soviet advisers) against Israel, killing 7 Israeli soldiers and causing significant damage. Due to fear of attacks like this, Israel avoided striking strategic targets deep inside Egypt throughout the entire war. This fear had been raised by military intelligence chief Eli Zeira at a situation assessment with the Chief of Staff already on October 9. After the war, the Soviets finished equipping the 65th Artillery Brigade, but support ceased during the late 1970s with the deterioration of relations between the Egyptians and the Soviets. After Hosni Mubarak rose to power in Egypt, relations improved with the Soviets, but Egypt decided to refurbish and improve its inventory of R-17 missiles with North Korean assistance during the 1990s.

=== Iran ===
Lacking the ability of striking targets more than 150 km (93 mi) beyond its border during the early stages of the Iran-Iraq war, the Iranians entered negotiations with the Libyans, who agreed to send two TELs and around 20 R-17E missiles to Iran, alongside instructors to train Iranian personnel. In 12 March, 1985 the Islamic Revolutionary Guard Corps launched a R-17 against Kirkuk, prompting the Iraqis to retaliate with missile launches against Dezful and Bakhtaran.

Baghdad was attacked with 13 missiles while Kirkuk was attacked by another missile before an agreement to halt the firing of ballistic missiles was reached in June 1984. Following their success in striking Iraq's capital, the Iranians led new diplomatic missions to acquire more R-17 missiles. The Libyans, under pressure from Moscow, refused to send any more missiles. Syria is believed to have supplied Iran with about a dozen missiles (despite Soviet objections), allowing them to fire launch another eight missiles against Baghdad and other Iraqi cities in the second half of 1986. The Iranians also turned to North Korea to obtain additional missiles. It's estimated that North Korea provided Iran with 6−12 TELs and up to 200 Hwasong-5 missiles between 1987 and 1992, though some reports claim that as many as 300 missiles were delivered.

=== Iraq ===
Iraq acquired a R-17 brigade with 11 TELs and 819 missiles in 1974, shortly after Egypt. When war broke out with Iran in 1980, the Iraqi Brigade 224 launched some missiles, but most of the strikes against Iranian targets were conducted by the Iraqi Air Force. Following a failed air campaign, the Brigade 224 was deployed to strike Iranian cities along the border.

Following Iranian R-17 strikes in Baghdad, Saddam Hussein attempted to buy long-range missiles to strike Tehran, but faced with Moscow's refusal, the Iraqis began modifying their existing stockpile of R-17 missiles, extending their range. The resulting missile, the Al-Husayn was extensively used during the final phase of the War of the cities starting in 29 February 1988, with a profoundly demoralizing effect on the civilians and forcing around a quarter of the 10 million inhabitants to be evacuated from the city by the early spring. Both sides agreed to halt the missile attacks on 20 April 1988, but Iraq managed to bring Iran to the negotiating table following the missile campaign.

The Iraqis continued the development of extended range R-17 missiles after the war ended, including the Al-Abbas with a range of 860 km (530 mi), and the Al Hijarah with a concrete warhead for penetrating hardened targets such as Iranian or Israeli nuclear facilities. They were less successful at manufacturing R-17 copies, due to the difficulty in producing some of the more complex components such as engine turbo-pumps and guidance gyroscopes. Iraqi engineers also worked on locally building TELs (based on commercial trucks) and some static launchers (to be used against Israel).

During the Gulf War, the Brigade 224 carried missile strikes against Israel and Saudi Arabia, with at least 42 against the former and 46 against the latter. The Coalition forces employed MIM-104 Patriots to intercept Iraqi Al Husayn missiles. A problem faced by the Patriot was the Al Husayn poor design: due to the stretched fuselage, the missile became unstable upon descent, disintegrating upon atmospheric re-entry, forcing Patriots to choose which trail of debris to intercept, with critics pointing out that 1.8 tons of missile debris hitting the ground at high speed could still cause significant damage regardless of whether the R-17 warhead detonated. Regardless of the controversy, Zaloga argues that the use of Patriots did serve the political purpose of restraining the Israeli response to the Iraqi missile strikes which could have severely affected the cohesion of the Coalition.

Most of the Iraqi fixed R-17 launchers were destroyed by coalition airstrikes, while attempts of destroying Iraq's 9P117 TELs failed, with 1,500 sorties launched and no hits scored. After the war, the coalition forced Iraq to destroy its remaining stockpiles of R-17 missiles, though suspicions that Iraq had failed to do so would persist for the next decade.

=== Libya ===
In 1974, Libya received at least six battalions of R-17 missiles, with 72 TELs and around 200−300 missiles. Some of these missiles were sent to Iran in the War of the cities. In 1986, Muammar Gaddafi ordered a R-17 missile strike against a United States facility on the Italian island of Lampedusa in retaliation for the United States bombing of Libya. Two missiles were fired, but they fell short of their mark, causing no damage.

It has been rumoured that R-17s were fired by loyalist forces against rebels in the 2011 Libyan civil war during the first phase of the war. On 14 August 2011 a confirmed R-17 launch was detected by a US Aegis destroyer, with the missile fired from Sirte and heading toward rebel positions in Ajdabiya. The missile fell 80 km off target in the middle of the desert, inflicting no damage. Eight days later, on August 22, three more R-17 launches were detected by NATO.

=== Syria ===
The Assad regime made wide use of R-17 missiles against opposition forces and civilian areas during the Syrian civil war with the first reported deployment in late 2012. Israeli sources claimed that 90% of the Syrian ballistic missile arsenal was expended against the rebels. Despite having developed chemical warheads for its missile arsenal, pro-Assad forces used aerial bombs and artillery rockets to carry nerve agent attacks instead.

After the fall of the Assad regime in December 2024, Israel launched airstrikes against Syrian ballistic missile production facilities and former Syrian Arab Army missile bases, but video evidence following the airstrikes indicate that at least some missile capabilities may have survived.

=== Yemen ===
In the late 1970s, Yemen acquired a R-17 brigade. During the civil war in May−June 1994, Southern Yemeni rebels fired R-17 missiles against the capital Sanaa, prompting the Northern forces to retaliate with Tochka missiles. Around 30 R-17 and 35 Tochka missiles were fired by the end of the conflict.

After the 2015 Houthi takeover in Yemen, the Houthis managed to capture the country pre-war stocks of R-17 and Hwasong-6 missiles. They were used against the internationally recognized government forces during the summer of 2015. According to the OSINT website Oryx, most R-17 (and Hwasongs) were converted into Burkan missiles until their stockpiles were depleted. Since 2016, the Houthis have used domestically produced missiles with Iranian assistance instead.

== Specifications ==
- Range – 300 km,
- CEP – 500–900 m
- Type of fuel – liquid
- Preparation time – 1 hour
- Period of storage – 19 years (in stock), 6 month (in combat condition)
- Flight time – 15 minutes

== Operators ==
=== Current ===
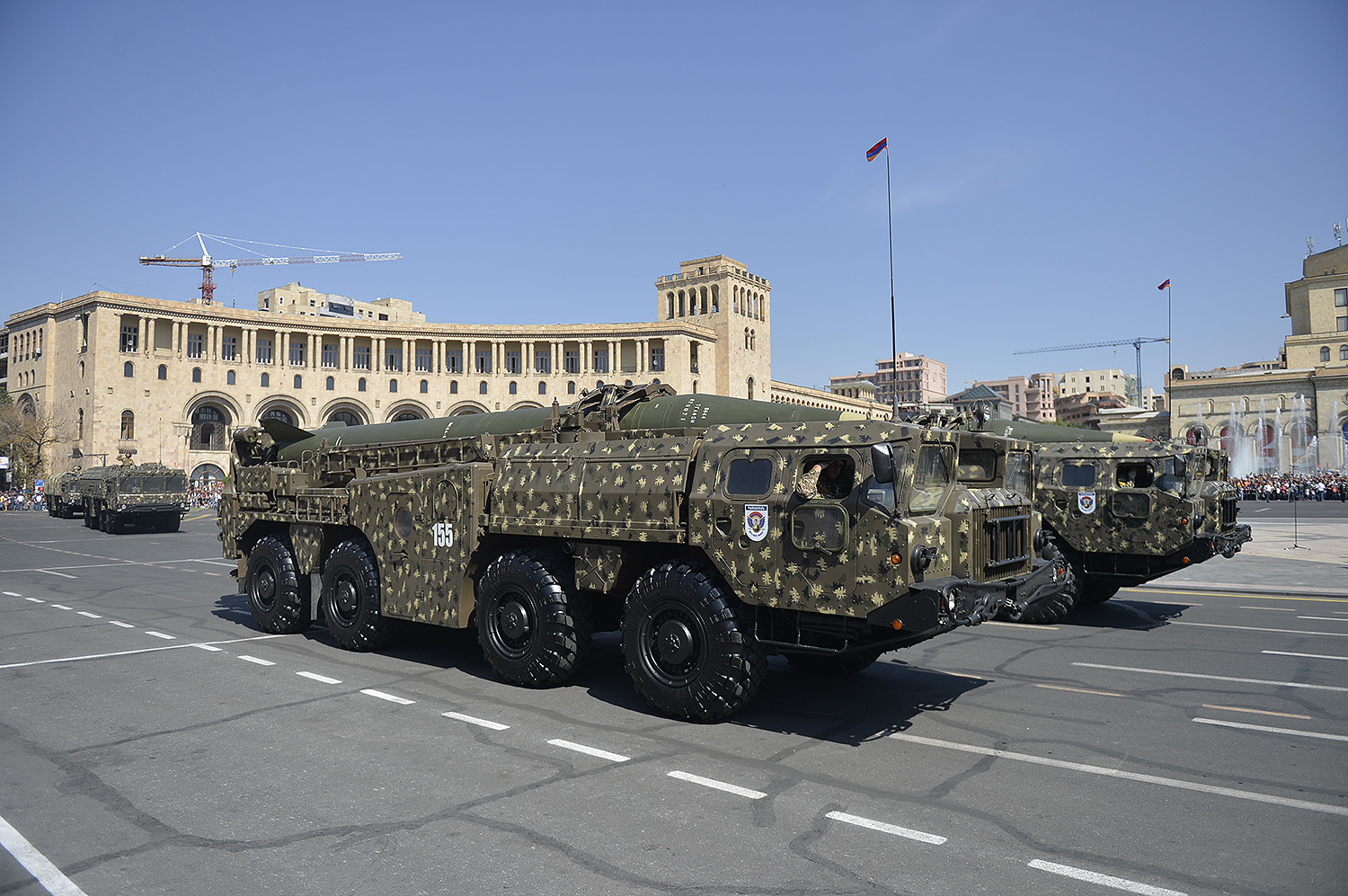
R-17 of the Armenian army during the military parade in Yerevan

- Armenia – 7+ launchers as of 2024
- Egypt − 9 launchers as of 2024
- North Korea − Produced locally as the Hwasong-5
- Syria − Status unknown following the fall of the Assad regime
- Turkmenistan − 16 launchers as of 2024
- Vietnam

=== Former ===
- Afghanistan − The last 4 operational launchers were scrapped in 2005
- Azerbaijan
- Belarus − Scrapped
- Czechoslovakia − Passed on to successor states
- Czech Republic − Scrapped
- Georgia
- East Germany
- Hungary − Scrapped
- Iran − 20 missiles and 2 TELs supplied by Libya in 1982, Syrian R-17 and North Korean Hwasong-5 missiles were also used
- Iraq − Includes local modifications: Al-Husayn, Al-Abbas, and Al Hijarah missiles
- Kazakhstan
- Libya
- Poland − Scrapped
- Romania
- Russia
- Slovakia
- Soviet Union − Passed on to successor states
- Ukraine
- Yemen − Pre-war stocks depleted during the Yemeni civil war (2014–present). Most were converted into Burkan missiles by the Houthis

=== Evaluation-only ===
- United States − 30 missiles and 4 TELs purchased in 1995, these missiles were converted into targets by Lockheed Martin

== See also ==
- Hwasong-5 – (North Korea)
- Hwasong-6 – (North Korea)

== Bibliography ==
- International Institute for Strategic Studies (12 February 2024). "Chapter Four: Russia and Eurasia". The Military Balance. 124 (1). Taylor & Francis: 158–217. doi:10.1080/04597222.2024.2298592. ISSN 0459-7222.
- International Institute for Strategic Studies (12 February 2024). "Chapter Five: Asia". The Military Balance. 124 (1). Taylor & Francis: 218–327. doi:10.1080/04597222.2024.2298593. ISSN 0459-7222.
- International Institute for Strategic Studies (12 February 2024). "Chapter Six: Middle East and North Africa". The Military Balance. 124 (1). Taylor & Francis: 328–395. doi:10.1080/04597222.2024.2298594. ISSN 0459-7222.
- Samaan, Jean-Loup (2023). New Military Strategies in the Gulf: The Mirage of Autonomy in Saudi Arabia, the UAE and Qatar. Bloomsbury Publishing. ISBN 978-0-7556-5073-6.
- Samore, Gary (2013). Iran's Strategic Weapons Programmes: A Net Assessment. Routledge. ISBN 978-1-136-77673-1.
- Zaloga, Steven J. (2013) [2006]. Scud Ballistic Missile and Launch Systems 1955–2005 (ePUB ed.). Bloomsbury Publishing. ISBN 978-1-4728-0306-1.
