= Al-Tammuz =

Type of surface-to-surface missile

- Type: Medium-range ballistic missile
- Place of origin: Iraq

Specifications
- Diameter: 1.25 m
- Engine: Second stage of Al-Abid's engine
- Payload capacity: >1,000 kg
- Propellant: Liquid propelled
- Operational range: 1,200-2,000 km

The Al-Tammuz missile was an Iraqi project to design a medium-range ballistic missile (MRBM) based on Scud technology that could deliver a payload of at least 1,000 kg to a distance of 1,200 km. The missile could potentially have helped Iraq in delivering nuclear payloads.

== History ==
Iraq had been planning to produce a liquid propelled surface-to-surface missile having a range of 1,200-2,000 km based on current Scud technology. The Iraqis had started Project 144 for the production and modification of missile systems and designated it to the Al Qaya state establishment. The Iraqis also assigned project 1729 to Nassr State Enterprise, Research and Development Center, Taji-Baghdad. The Iraqis also started Project 1728 for indigenous scud engine development and production. Practical work on this missile, however, did not start until April 1989, according to Iraqi suggestions the nuclear capable version would not have been ready by 1993, two years after the first Iraqi nuclear weapon was to be produced.

The Al-Tammuz missile program received help from foreign expertise especially from the Brazilian scientist Major General Hugo de Oliveira Piva.

== Characteristics ==
The missile was to be liquid propelled with a range of 1,200-2,000 km and a payload capacity of at least one ton. The engine was to be based on the Second stage of Al-Abid LV. Note that some sources also designate the al-Abid LV as Tammuz-2.

== See also ==
- Al-Hussein (missile)
- Al-Hijarah (missile)
- Badr-2000
