= Iraqi strikes on Saudi Arabia =

1991 Iraqi military operations targeting American bases

- Part of the Gulf War
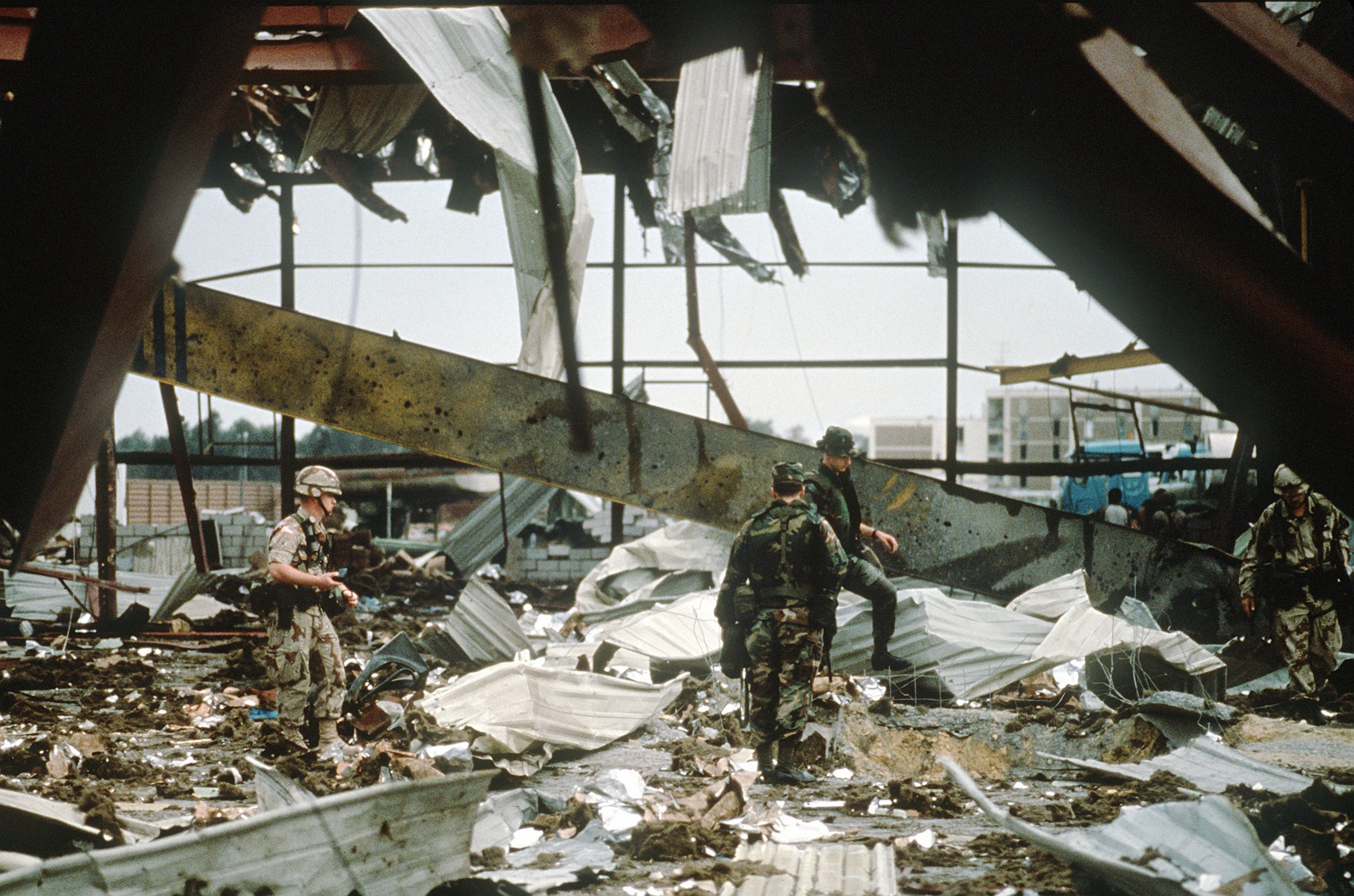
- The aftermath of an Iraqi missile strike on an American barracks in Dhahran on 25 February 1991
- Type: Airstrike
- Location: Dhahran and Riyadh, Saudi Arabia
- Planned by: Iraq
- Target: Saudi Arabian and American military targets
- Date: 18 January – 26 February 1991
- Executed by: (Iraq) Iraqi Armed Forces: (Iraq) Iraqi Ground Forces
- Outcome: Successful
- Casualties: (United States) 28 American soldiers killed; (United States) 150 American soldiers injured; (Saudi Arabia) 1 Saudi killed; (United Nations) 85 civilians injured (including Saudis and foreign nationals)

Between 18 January and 26 February 1991, Iraq launched 46 al-Husayn Scud missiles against Saudi Arabian and American military targets in Dhahran and the Saudi capital of Riyadh amidst the Gulf War. Attacks began hours after US General Norman Schwarzkopf emphasized large-scale efforts taken to comb the vast expanses of western Iraq for missile attacks aimed at Israel.

Although the attacks were largely inaccurate, the missiles caused 28 of the 148 United States battle deaths during the Gulf War when one of them hit a US military barracks in Dharhan. Most of the Iraqi ballistic missiles fired at Saudi Arabia were aimed at military targets, leading to low civilian casualties.

== Background ==
The threat posed by the Iranian Revolution in 1979 to the Arab states of the Persian Gulf forced Saudi Arabia to back Iraq during the Iran–Iraq War and cut its diplomatic ties with Iran. Saudi Arabia and Iraq saw each other as allies with a common goal of counterbalancing Iranian expansion and radical Shia Islamism. Unlike Iran, Iraq was not too aggressive in challenging the status quo of the Saudi Kingdom, causing Saudi Arabia to view Iraq as a buffer state against Iranian expansionism. Despite declaring neutrality in the Iran–Iraq War, Saudi Arabia supported Iraq diplomatically, politically and financially, offering loans of $25 billion.

Following the Iraqi invasion of Kuwait in 1990, Saudi Arabia broke diplomatic ties with Iraq and allowed 700,000 US troops to enter the country. Saudi Arabia's air bases served as the main staging areas for US aerial airstrikes against Iraqi targets during the Gulf War.

== Attacks ==
The first Iraqi missile was launched at Saudi Arabia on 18 January, although it was destroyed over Dhahran Air Base by US Army's Patriot air-defence missiles. On the night of 20 January, US Patriot air-defence missiles intercepted nine Iraqi Scud missiles fired at major Saudi cities and military installations, including five launched at Dhahran and other four at Riyadh. A tenth Scud missile landed in the Persian Gulf. The Saudi Press Agency reported that the attack on Riyadh slightly injured 12 people as a result of "some shrapnel" which "fell on a building in one of the districts of Riyadh".

On 25 January, Iraq launched two missiles at Riyadh. According to American sources, both missiles were detected, although only one was intercepted in the air by a Patriot. The second one was hit, but not destroyed. The warhead of the second missile totally destroyed one wing of the six-story Ministry of Interior Civil Records building, consequently killing one Saudi citizen and injuring 30 people of different nationalities. During the next three days, two Iraqi missiles fired at Saudi Arabia were intercepted. On 3 February, an Iraqi missile hit Riyadh at 1:00 am, slightly injuring 29 people, mostly due to splinters of glass windows.

The missile attack on Hafar al-Batin on 14 February was the last attack that inflicted civilian casualties or damage in Saudi Arabia or other areas in the Gulf. Prior to the attack on 25 February, Iraqi Scud missile attacks killed one person and injured about 85.

On 25 February, an Iraqi Scud missile demolished a makeshift United States barracks in Dhahran that housed more than 100 American troops overnight. 28 American soldiers were killed, 110 were hospitalized and 150 experienced minor physical injuries. This attack caused the highest number of casualties since Iraq started launching Scud missiles against Saudi Arabia on 18 January. This single Scud's impact accounted for more than a third of all US soldiers killed during the Gulf War.

The 14th Quartermaster Detachment, one of the units billeted at Dharhan and specializing in water-purification, suffered the heaviest toll among US troops deployed in the Persian Gulf, with 81% of its soldiers killed or wounded. According to CNN, an Iraqi Information Ministry official stated that missiles were aimed at Dhahran "to punish those who gave up honor". US military officials refused to discuss the incident and confiscated news photographers' film.

== Casualties ==
The missile attacks had a very low death toll on Saudi Arabia's civilian population. Only one Saudi civilian was reported killed in Riyadh on 25 January, when an Iraqi missile hit a six-story government building, and another 77 were lightly injured.

Reports of civilian casualties ceased after an attack on 14 February that lightly injured four people in Hafar al-Batin. A single Iraqi missile attack caused 28 of the 148 United States battle deaths.
