= Al-Abbas (missile) =

al-Abbas
- Type: Short-range ballistic missile
- Place of origin: Iraq

Service history
- In service: Abandoned

Specifications
- Length: 14.51 m
- Diameter: 0.89 m
- Payload capacity: 140–450 kg, chemical and biological capable
- Propellant: Liquid propelled
- Operational range: 800–950 km
- Guidance system: Inertial guidance
- Accuracy: 5,000 m CEP
- Launch platform: MAZ-7310

al-Abbas was an Iraqi short-range, surface-to-surface ballistic missile that was a longer range version of the al-Hussein missile designed to reach most of the Middle East including the Strait of Hormuz. Like the al-Hussein, the al-Abbas too was a Scud missile derivative.

== History ==
The Scud missiles initially used by Iraq during the Iran–Iraq War did not prove helpful as the range of the missiles was only 300 km (190 mi) and could not reach the Iranian capital Tehran. The Iraqis would then develop the Al-Hussein missile and later the al-Abbas missile, which would have an even longer range. In April 1988 the missile was successfully tested, reports suggest that the Iraqis achieved its high range of 800 km (500 mi) by increasing fuel capacity, lengthening the size of fuel tanks, cannibalizing oxidizer and propellant tanks from other Scuds and decreasing the regular Scud payload from 800 to 140 kg (1,760 to 310 lb). The Iraqis however did not use it later on due to poor missile guidance and flight instability. It is still unknown whether this missile reached operational status and was stockpiled or not.

== Characteristics ==
The al-Abbas missile was designed to have a range of 950 km (590 mi) however sources suggest that it could only fly up to 800 km (500 mi). It had a diameter of 0.88 m (2 ft 11 in) just like the Scud missile, however, its length was 14.50 m (47.6 ft) opposed to 11.5 m (38 ft) of the previous scud missile. The Iraqis had reduced the payload of the scud missile to about 140–450 kg (310–990 lb), sources suggest that it was chemical/biological warhead capable. The al-Abbas missile was only accurate within a range of 500 m (1,600 ft) and it had a CEP of 5,000 m (16,000 ft). The missile was said to be unstable because it would tumble about its centre of gravity on reentry, it also had poor guidance.

== See also ==
- al-Hussein (missile)
- Al-Samoud 2
- Badr-2000
