= Al-Samoud 2 =

Al Samoud
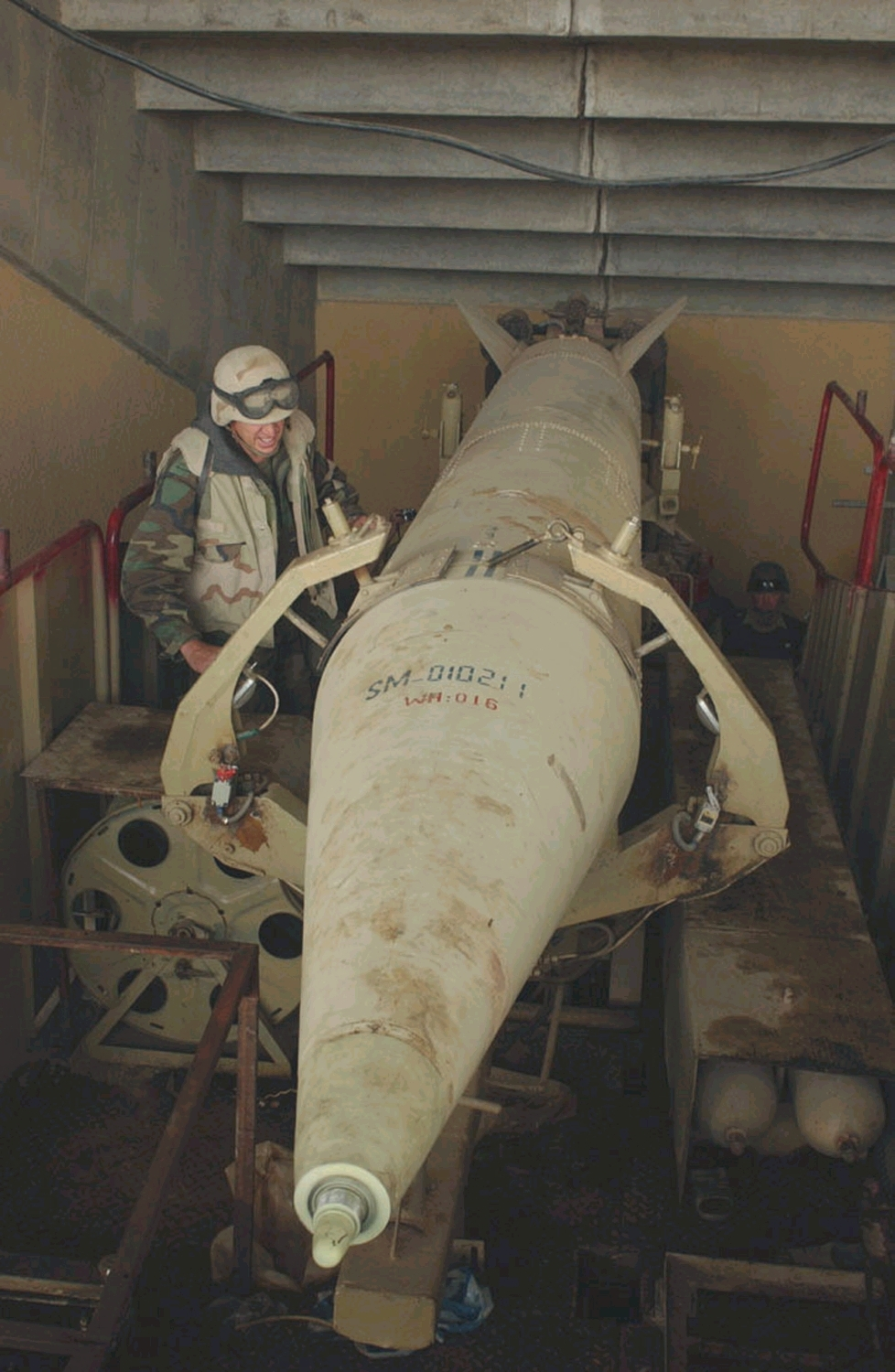
- An Al Samoud missile captured by US forces in Southern Iraq (2003)
- Type: Single-stage ballistic missile

Service history
- In service: 2003
- Used by: Iraqi Army

Production history
- Manufacturer: Iraq
- Produced: 2001-2003

Specifications
- Length: 7,14m
- Diameter: 760mm
- Warhead: 280kg
- Propellant: Liquid propellant (Al-Samoud)RFNA/UDMH; Solid propellant (Ababil-100)
- Operational range: 180km
- Guidance system: Inertial
- Accuracy: 2.0 km CEP
- Launch platform: Mobile launcher

Al-Samoud (الصمود, alternately Al-Samed, which means steadfastness in Arabic) was a liquid-propellant rocket tactical ballistic missile developed by Iraq in the years between the Gulf War and the 2003 Invasion of Iraq. The Iraqi army also developed a solid-fuel rocket version known as Ababil-100.

== Development ==
The missile was essentially a scaled-down Scud, though parts were mostly derived from the Soviet S-75 Dvina surface-to-air missile. The first test-firing was carried out as early as 1997 and was supervised by UNSCOM. The production started in 2001, and the goal was the assembly of ten missiles each month. The Al Samoud 2 was not fully operational by 2003, but some of them had been already delivered to the Iraqi army.

=== Engine ===
The rocket engine evolved from the S-75 Dvina design and the thrust vector controls from the Scud. The system also included an Iraqi-designed mobile launcher similar to the Al-Nida, built for the missile Al Hussein, produced by the Iraqi company Al-Fida.

=== Payload ===
The missile carried a 280 kilogram warhead that was half high explosives and half protective steel shell. The explosive charge weighed 140 kg, made of a mixture of 84 kg of RDX (60%), 42 kg of TNT (30%) and 14 kg of aluminium (10%), the latter used as an energetic blast enhancer. The payload was also designed to upload different types of bomblets.

=== Guidance ===
The guidance package was assembled by cannibalizing gyroscopes from the Chinese Silkworm cruise missile. A source is cited as claiming that there were inertial and even GPS guidance systems illegally imported from Belarus, but these allegations have not been confirmed.

== Banned by the UN ==
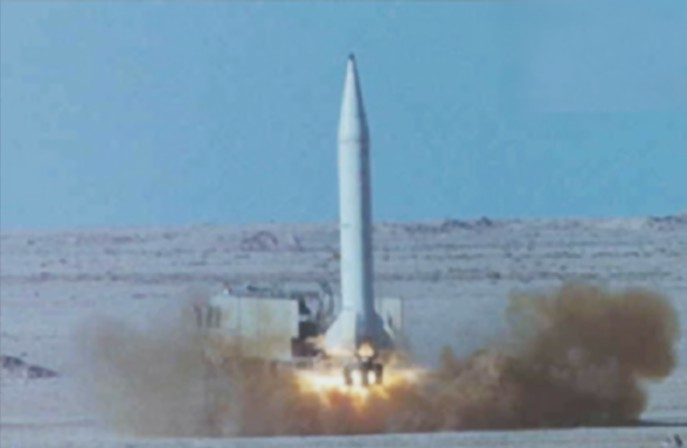
A test-launch of an Al Samoud, circa 1997

On February 13, 2003, a UN panel reported that Iraq's Al-Samoud 2 missiles, disclosed by Iraq to weapons inspectors in December, have a range of 180 km, in breach of UNSCR 1441. The limit allowed by the UN is 150 km.

Iraq agreed to destroy the Al-Samoud 2 long range missiles, and by mid-March 2003, a number had been destroyed. Although UNMOVIC ordered to stop its production, Iraq assembled some 20 missiles during the early months of 2003.

American forces found a cache of 12 Al Samoud missiles south of Baiji on July 21, 2003.

== Operational history (March–April 2003) ==
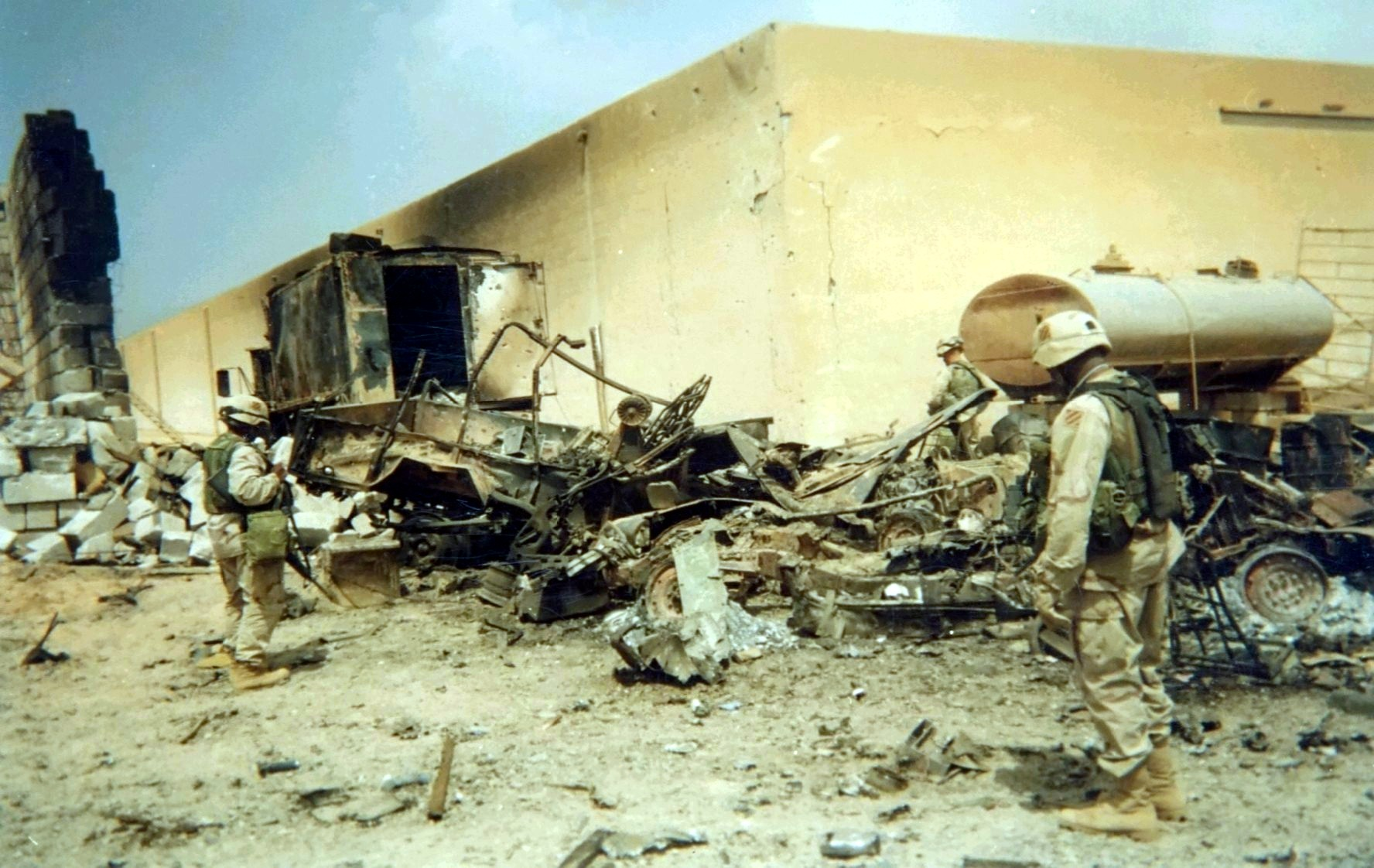
Aftermath of the Iraqi missile attack on 7 April 2003 on the Tactical Operational Center of 2nd Brigade, 3rd Infantry Division, US Army.

A number of Al-Samoud 2 missiles were fired at Kuwait during the 2003 conflict. One of them, aimed at the Coalition Headquarters at Camp Doha, was successfully intercepted by a Patriot missile on March 27. Some debris hit buildings inside the US base. The other missiles were also shot down or landed harmlessly in the desert.

A similar development, the Al-Fahd or Ababil-100, a solid propellant version of the Al-Samoud, was also used by the Iraqi army during the invasion. The Operational Center of the 2nd Brigade, US 3rd Infantry Division, were struck south of Baghdad by a missile of this kind on April 7. Three soldiers and two foreign reporters were killed in the blast.

== See also ==
- List of missiles
- Al Husayn
