= Al-Husayn (missile) =

Iraqi short-range ballistic missile

al-Husayn
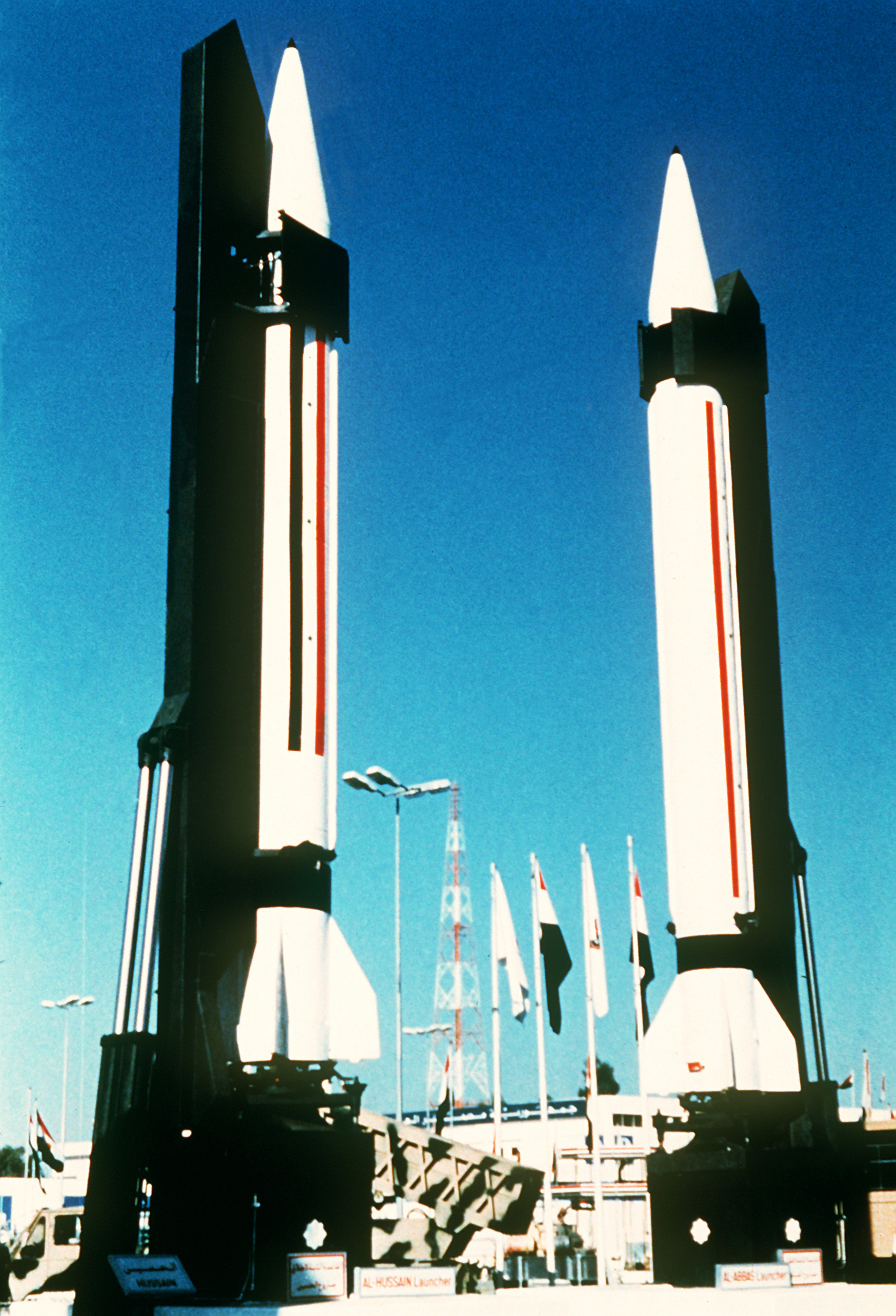
- Soviet-built, Iraqi-modified "Al Husayn" (left) and "Al Abbas" missiles (right) displayed with their erector-launchers. Baghdad arms exhibition, April–May 1989
- Type: Single-stage SRBM

Service history
- In service: 1987–1991

Production history
- Manufacturer: Iraq (1987–1991)

Specifications
- Mass: 6,400 kg (14,110 lb)
- Length: 12,460 mm (41.5 ft)
- Diameter: 900 mm (3 ft)
- Warhead: 500 kg (1,102 lb) of payload; High explosive; Chemical, biological and nuclear capabilities
- Propellant: liquid propelled
- Operational range: 650 km (400 miles)
- Flight altitude: 150 km (94 miles)
- Maximum speed: 1.5 km/s (0.9 miles/s)
- Guidance system: Inertial
- Launch platform: 3 Mobile launchers: MAZ-Soviet modified; Al-Whaleed-local production; Al-Nida-local production; Concrete silo

al-Husayn (Arabic: الحسین, romanized: al-Ḥusayn) was a short-range ballistic missile developed in Ba'athist Iraq. An upgraded version of the R-17 Elbrus missile, the al-Husayn was widely used by the Iraqi Ground Forces during the Iran–Iraq War (1980–1988) and the Persian Gulf War (1990–1991).

== Development ==
The origins of the al-Husayn could be traced back to the first stages of the war with Iran. Iraq was the first belligerent to use long-range artillery rockets during the Iran–Iraq War, firing limited numbers of 9K52 Luna-M at the towns of Dezful and Ahvaz. Iran responded with R-17s obtained from Libya. These missiles can hit a target 300 km away, therefore, key Iraqi cities like Sulaymaniya, Kirkuk, and Baghdad came within the range of this weapon.

Iraq, which also deployed the R-17, was conversely unable to strike the main Iranian industrial centers, including the capital, Tehran, because these are located more than 500 km from the border. To surmount the Iranian advantage, Iraqi engineers designed a program to upgrade the original R-17s into a series of ballistic missiles whose range would surpass 800 km. The assembly facility was located near Taji.

The first development, called al-Husayn, with a range of 650 km, allowed the Iraqi army to attack deep inside the Iranian territory. The Iraqis had initiated Project 1728 for indigenous engine development and production. The range was extended by reducing the original 945 kg warhead to 500 kg and increasing the propellant capacity. The warhead carried HE, although it had chemical, biological and nuclear capabilities. According to UN inspectors' reports, the Iraqis were able to produce all the major components of the system by 1991. The al-Husayn was 12,460 mm long and had a diameter of 880 mm. The guidance was inertial, without terminal phase. The altitude where the motor burnt out was 50 km, while the trajectory highest altitude or apogee, was 150 km. The accuracy for the impact, or circular error probable, was estimated in a radius of 1,000 meters, and the missile launch weight was 6,400 kg.

Its flight time was of about eight minutes for the maximum range.

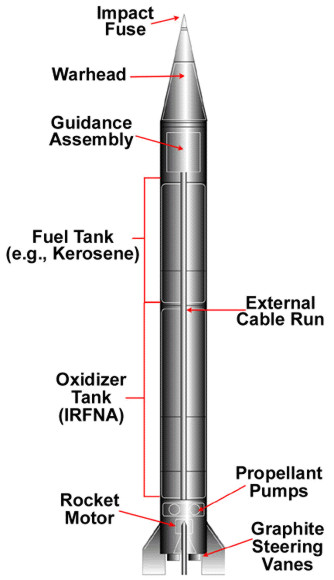
Al-Hussein components

The missile fuel was common to every tactical missile of the Cold War, namely, a mix of kerosene, ignited by a nitric acid oxidizer, called IRFNA. Each missile loaded 4,500 kg of liquid propellant, composed by a 22% of kerosene and 78% of IRFNA.

The Iraqis also extended the launch rail of 11 Soviet-produced MAZ-543 artillery trucks to fit them for the longer local-built missiles. The unit responsible for the maintenance and operation of the new missiles was initially the 224 Brigade, established since 1976 to deal with the R-17s imported from the Soviet Union in 1972.

By 1989, a second army brigade was formed, the 223, equipped with four locally developed trailer launchers, known as the Al-Nida, which included azimuth identification systems (AzID) for targeting. There was also a second indigenous launcher, the Al-Waleed, but it apparently never became operational.

Some concrete silos were built west of Ar Rutba, near the border with Jordan. They were destroyed by precision bombings carried out by USAF F-15s during the first hours of Operation Desert Storm.

== Operational history ==
=== Iran–Iraq War (1980–1988) ===
Up to 200 missiles were launched against Iran in 1987 and 1988, killing some 2,000 people. Tehran, Qom and Isfahan became the usual targets. Their poor accuracy, while mostly ineffective to conduct a major strategic campaign, made them basically weapons of terror, forcing thousands of refugees out of the main Iranian cities. This exchange of ballistic missiles became known as 'the war of the cities'. The campaign lasted from 29 February 1988 until April 20, when a truce was agreed by both sides. Iraq, which had been looking for some kind of compromise gesture from Iran, is largely viewed as the 'winner' by some sources.

According to Iranian sources, the fuselage and warhead were prone to breaking into fragments while re-entering the atmosphere. This phenomenon later was an advantage as a counter-measure against the Patriot missile during the 1991 Persian Gulf War.

=== Persian Gulf War (1991) ===
Eighty-eight of these modified R-17s were fired at Saudi Arabia (46) and Israel (42) during January and February 1991.

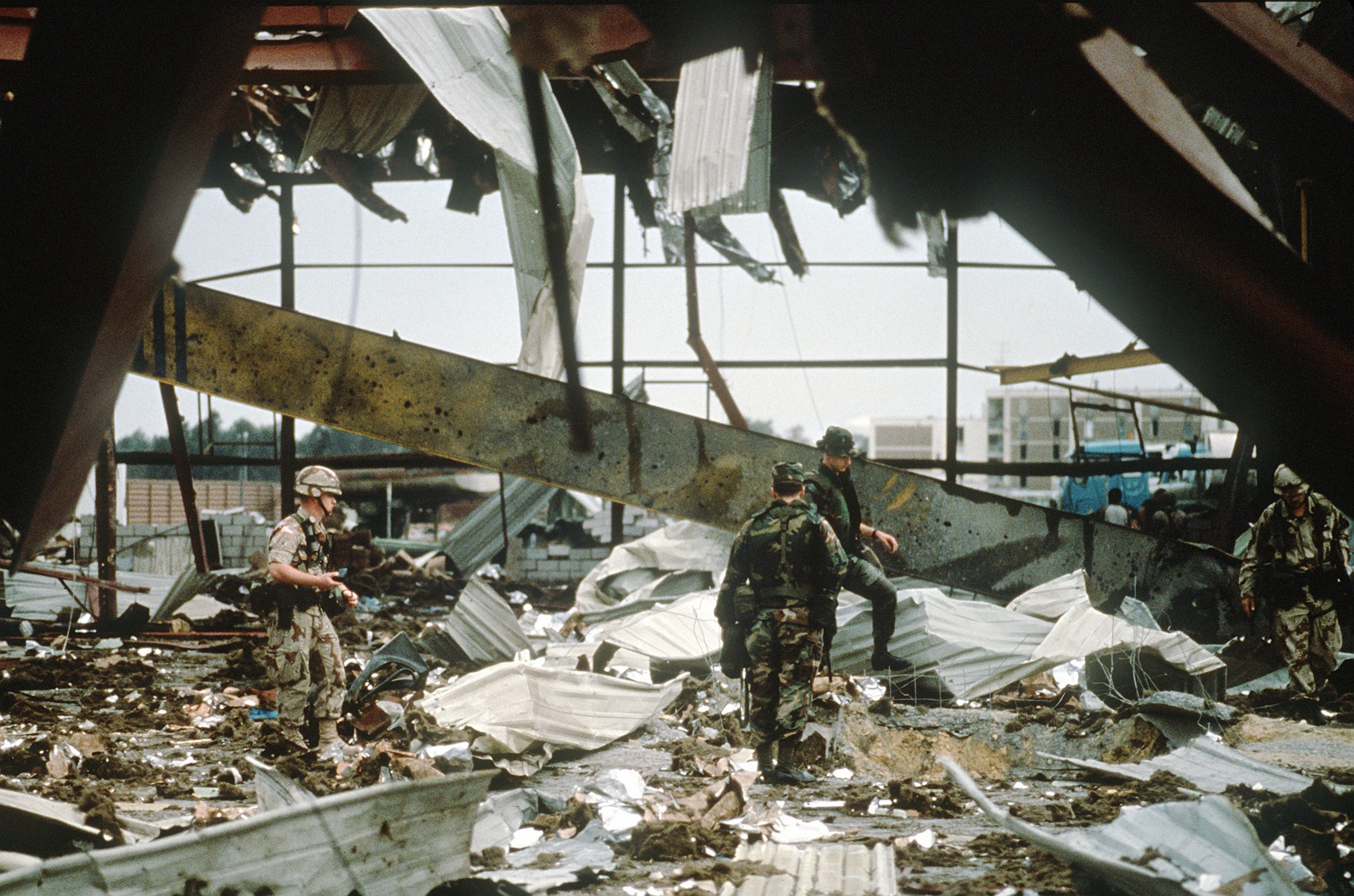
Aftermath of the Al-Hussein strike on US Army barracks at Dhahran, 25 February 1991

The greatest tactical achievement of the al-Husayn was the destruction of a US military barracks in Dhahran, Saudi Arabia, on 25 February 1991, at 8:30 p.m. local time, when 28 soldiers were killed and another 110 injured, mainly reservists from Pennsylvania.

One of the units involved in this incident, the 14th Quartermaster Detachment, specializing in water-purification, suffered the heaviest toll among US troops deployed in the Persian Gulf, with 81% of its soldiers killed or wounded.

The failure of the Patriot system in tracking the Iraqi missile over Dhahran was due to a shift in the range gate of the radar, due to the continuous use of the software for more than 100 hours without resetting.

Only 10 of the 46 al-Husayn launched at Saudi Arabia caused significant damage: two strikes on US military bases (including the army barracks at Dhahran), one on a Saudi government building, and the remaining seven on civilian facilities. The following is a detailed list of these attacks:

Attacks assessment

No.	Place & date	Target	Area damaged	Cause of damage	Intercepted by Patriot
1	January 22; Dhahran	USAF air base	Hangar area hit by explosion F-15C serial nº 83-0026 damaged 1 Patriot launcher damaged Civilian airport struck by debris	Warhead/Debris	Yes
2	January 22; Riyadh	Coalition air base	Civilian neighborhood	Warhead	Yes
3	January 25; Riyadh	Coalition headquarters	Saudi Department of Interior	Warhead	Yes
4	January 28; Riyadh	Downtown Riyadh	Experimental farm southeast of the capital	Debris	Yes
5	February 3 Riyadh	Downtown Riyadh	Apartments area	Warhead	Yes
6	February 8 Riyadh	North of the city	Parking lot	Warhead	Yes
7	February 11; Riyadh	Downtown Riyadh	Islamic University campus	Warhead	Yes
8	February 14; Hafar al-Batin	King Khalid Military City	Automobile workshop destroyed Neighborhood damaged	Warhead	No
9	February 24; Riyadh	Coalition headquarters	Girls school	Debris	Yes
10	February 25; Dhahran	USAF air base	US Army barracks destroyed	Warhead	No

Besides the American soldiers, Saudi authorities reported one security guard killed and about 70 civilians injured as result of the missile strikes.

Thirty-eight of the 42 missiles aimed at Israel landed within the boundaries of that country; the other four fell on the West Bank area. Although thousands of houses and apartments were damaged by the strikes, only two people died directly as consequence of the impacts. Another 12 died from indirect causes (suffocation while wearing gas-masks and heart attacks).

The threat posed by the al-Husayn and R-17 missiles forced the coalition air forces to divert 40% of their missions to hunt the launchers along with their support vehicles and supplies. The ground war was postponed one week for this reason.

== End of the program ==
Under the terms of the ceasefire of March 1991, corroborated by the resolution 687 of the UN Security Council, a commission (UNSCOM) was established to assure the dismantling of the Iraqi missile program. They were only allowed to purchase or produce missiles with a range no longer than 150 km. At the end of the war, the Iraqi government declared it had only 61 al-Husayn and other ballistic missiles in its arsenal. These weapons were destroyed under UNSCOM supervision. This process was completed by July 1991. However, the western powers were suspicious that the Iraqi army may have hidden as many as 200 missiles. The Iraqis took advantage of the provisions of the ceasefire by developing two types of short-range ballistic missiles, the Ababil-100 (also called al Fat'h) and the Al-Samoud, which were in an experimental phase at the time of the Invasion of Iraq in 2003. These projects were part of the casus belli raised by the American administration against Saddam Hussein.

== See also ==
=== Related articles ===
- List of missiles
- Iraqi ballistic missile attacks on Saudi Arabia
- 1991 Iraqi missile attacks against Israel
- Al Samoud 2
- Ababil-100

=== Iraqi missiles derived from al-Husayn missile ===
- Al Abbas
- Al Hijarah
