= Badr-2000 =

- Type: Medium-range ballistic missile
- Place of origin: Iraq

Service history
- In service: Did not enter production

Specifications
- Mass: 4800 kg
- Length: 10.30 m
- Diameter: 800 mm (Booster)
- Payload capacity: 350 kg
- Propellant: Two-stage solid propelled First stage Booster:HTPB; Second stage rocket engine: UDMH fuel+Mixed oxides of nitrogen(MON 7) Oxidizer
- Operational range: 1000 km (objective); 620-750 km (UNSCOM estimate)
- Accuracy: 30-50 m CEP

The Badr-2000 was an Iraqi high technology two-stage solid-propelled Medium-range ballistic missile that was based on the Argentinian Condor-II ballistic missile. Iraq invested a lot of money in the production of the missile, however it failed to produce the required manufacturing facilities and consequently the missile did not enter mass production.

== Development ==
In 1984/1985 Iraq entered in a program with Argentina and Egypt to develop a high-technology two-stage ballistic missile system of approximately 1000 km based on the Pershing II ballistic missile which would be called Condor-II in Argentina, BADR-2000 in Iraq. and Vector in Egypt The missile system under development consisted of all the systems required like computation, command and communication, transport and handling, launch preparation, power supply etc. Argentina would develop the missile while Egypt would help in procuring new technology and Iraq would finance the project. A number of Aerospace and defense companies from Italy and Germany aided the project and technical support was handled by a consortium of 16 European companies under the name Consen based in Switzerland. The project was supposed to be carried out in close collaboration with the Arab League Industrial Development Organisation (ALIDO) centered in Baghdad. When it came to the missile Iraq preferred to use solid propulsion in both stages as opposed to solid propulsion in first stage and liquid propulsion in the second. The liquid propelled engine which was being developed along with the Iraqi engines could be used in third stage and would turn the missile into a Space delivery vehicle for limited payloads. Iraq concentrated its efforts in the Belat al-Shuhada Factory. The project was supposed the Iraqis in 1985 would then commence Project 395 in effort to construct facilities to produce solid-propellant motors indigenously, many American firms were involved in Project 395 and helped Iraq build Infrastructure to produce the Condor-II missile. Since the project was mostly covert and Iraq itself lacked the production facilities, program progress was slow. In 1987 and 1988 disputes arose between Iraq and Argentina and Egypt regarding the provision of missiles, Iraq had grown suspicious regarding where its investment was going and in 1987 Iraq had signed a contract for 17 Badr-2000 missiles, however it realized that it would not get these missiles. By 1987 the building of three key sites required for the manufacturing of Badr-2000 missile had started. Collaboration ended in 1988 when Iraq was taking the project all by itself, in summer 1988 Egyptian scientist Abdel Kader Helmy was arrested in California for transferring missile technology to Iraq. Iraq declared that in 1989 it took the entire project on its own, by 1989 Iraq had invested $400 million in the project and had built a factory to manufacture propellants. In 1989 the Technical Corps for Special Projects (TECO), which was an affiliate of the Ministry of Industry and Military Industrialization (MIMI) which managed Iraq's military procurements, designated Project 395 to the Condor-II missile Program. Some additional military procurements were also imported by Iraq in 1989 and 1990. Iraq had erected an R&D research facility and three other facilities for Project 395, one facility managed production of solid propellants of the Badr-2000 missiles, the other motor cases, the third did final assembly and testing, all of which were part of the Belat Al-Shuhada missile factory. Despite that however the missile could not enter mass production and Iraq did not use any Badr-2000 missiles.

== Characteristics ==
The Badr-2000 was to be a mobile medium-range dual stage ballistic surface-to-surface missile. The Badr-2000 missile was intended to have a range of 1000 km although UNSCOM estimated that the actual range was around 620–750 km. The missile had a weight of 4800 kg and a payload of 350 kg, the payload itself was a separating reentry vehicle. The Badr-2000 missile had a length of 10.3 m and a width of 0.8 m which was the booster, all of this would amount to a CEP of 30–50 m.

=== First stage rocket ===
The first stage booster was 800 mm in diameter cased in maraging steel and filled with cast HTPB. Thrust vectoring for missile control in pitch and yaw for this stage was provided by a flexible joint nozzle with Hydraulic cylinders by stored and pressurized Helium. The flexible joint consisted of rings of elastomeric material enforced with steel.

=== Second stage rocket ===
The Argentinians used the MMH fuel and N_{2}O_{4} Oxidizer for the liquid propelled version. The Iraqis however would use UDMH as fuel and MON 7 as oxidizer. For Thrust vector control the missile used a gimbaled nozzle controlled by electromechanical systems. The second-stage engine would burn for no more than 40 seconds, two pyrotechnic valves would be responsible for shutting the engine down when desired altitude and velocity had been achieved. At the sustainer phase the roll axis would be controlled by cold gas thruster systems located in the reentry vehicle.

== Legacy ==
After the Gulf War UNSCOM supervised the destruction of all Badr-2000 missiles as well as production facilities. All production facilities were reduced to facilities that could only produce non-proscribed missile designs under UNSCOM supervision, nine solid propellant facility buildings were destroyed and two testing facility buildings were also destroyed however no motor-casing production facility was damaged. Iraq would later use the technology used in Badr-2000 for the single-stage Short-range "Badr-2000 Junior" (Ababil-100 which is also called al Fat'h) which lacked the flexible joint nozzle. Iraq would later attempt to acquire the 120 km single-stage rocket called Sakr-200 from Egypt, the fate of this attempt is unknown. Some sources also suggest that Iraq sought to design another long-range ballistic missile whose design was again based on the Badr-2000 and Al-Fat'h ballistic missiles.

== See also ==
- Al-Abbas (missile), a liquid propelled missile with similar range.
- Shahab-1, an Iranian equivalent
- Burkan-2, a Houthi equivalent
- Project Babylon
