= 1991 Iraqi missile attacks against Israel =

Part of the Gulf War

Iraqi missile attacks against Israel
- Part of the Gulf War and the Arab–Israeli conflict
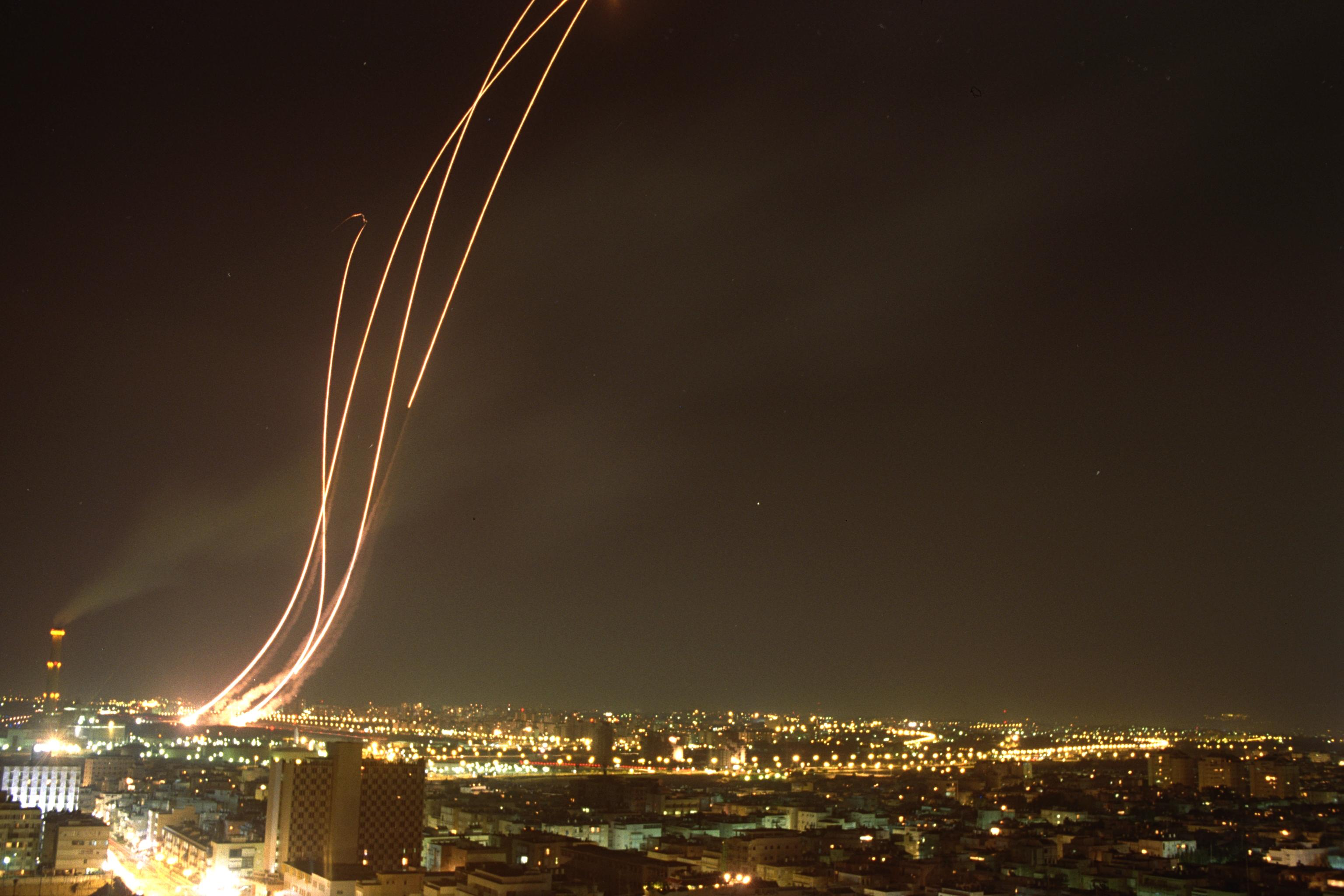
- American surface-to-air missiles (MIM-104 Patriot) launching to intercept incoming Iraqi ballistic missiles (al-Husayn) over the Israeli city of Tel Aviv, 12 February 1991
- Location: Israel
- Date: 17 January 1991 – 23 February 1991 (1 month and 6 days)
- Outcome: Iraq fails to provoke Israeli retaliation
- Casualties: 2 civilians killed directly; 11–74 civilians killed from incorrect use of gas masks, heart attacks, and incorrect use of atropine (for Iraqi chemical weapons); 230 civilians injured

On 17 January 1991, Iraq initiated a missile campaign against Israel. Over the next month, approximately 42 Scud missiles were fired into Israeli territory, primarily at the cities of Tel Aviv and Haifa. The missile attacks began on the same day as the Gulf War aerial bombardment campaign, which was targeting military infrastructure within Iraqi-occupied Kuwait. As many Muslim-majority countries were actively contributing to the American-led military coalition, the Iraqi government had expected them to rescind their support if Israel responded to the missile campaign by attacking Iraq.

Israel was convinced by Jordan and the United States to not retaliate. Jordanian king Hussein bin Talal persuaded Israeli prime minister Yitzhak Shamir to consider Jordan's stability and not violate Jordanian airspace during a bilateral meeting two weeks earlier, and the Bush administration had increased defense aid to Israel for the purpose of actively countering Iraq's barrages and preventing an Israeli counterattack, thereby ensuring that the coalition's Muslim countries did not withdraw.

On 23 February 1991, the coalition began a ground offensive into Iraqi-occupied Kuwait and Iraq proper. According to UK Cabinet Office records, the then-Minister of Defense of Israel, Moshe Arens said in a meeting at the White House that the Iraqi attacks had caused "extensive damage" in Israel.

== Background ==
During the 1948 Arab–Israeli War, Six-Day War and Yom Kippur War, the armies of Iraq and Israel saw action against one another as part of the broader Arab–Israeli conflict. At the onset of the Iran-Iraq conflict, approximately 80% of all weaponry imported by Iran originated from Israel. On 7 June 1981, Israel bombed Iraq's Osirak Nuclear Reactor with Iranian intelligence support. Israel's motivations for supporting Iran stemmed from a fear of what would have become if Iraq came out victorious and as an opportunity to create business for the Israeli arms industry.

== Attacks ==
Throughout the entire Gulf War air campaign, Iraqi forces fired approximately 42 Al Husayn missiles into Israel from 17 January to 23 February 1991. The strategic and political goal of the Iraqi campaign was to provoke an Israeli military response and potentially jeopardize the United States-led coalition against Iraq, which had full backing and/or extensive contributions from an overwhelming majority of the states of the Muslim world.

The coalition would have suffered immense diplomatic and material losses if Muslim-majority states rescinded their support due to the political situation of the ongoing Israeli–Palestinian conflict. Despite inflicting casualties on Israeli civilians and damaging Israeli infrastructure, Iraq failed to provoke Israeli retaliation due to pressure exerted by the United States on the latter to not respond to "Iraqi provocations" and avoid any bilateral escalations.

The Iraqi missiles were predominantly aimed at the Israeli cities of Tel Aviv and Haifa. Despite numerous missiles being fired, a number of factors contributed to the minimisation of casualties in Israel.

=== Missiles ===
In the late 1980s, Iraq modified their Scud missile arsenal to create an SRBM known as the Al Hussein. The primary reason for the upgrades was to increase the range of such missiles. Missile range increase came at a cost of accuracy and structural stability and on a number of occasions, Iraqi missiles fired at Israel either broke up mid-air or fell short of their target. The missile warheads on a number of occasions failed to detonate, with a reported dud missile rate of over 10%.

The missiles fired against Israel were conventional warheads and were not of chemical origin. Had chemical warheads been loaded, casualties would have been far greater.

=== Warning time ===
From the second attack onwards, the Israeli population were given a few minutes warning of an impending missile attack. Due to shared United States' satellite information on missile launches, citizens were given appropriate time to seek shelter from the impending missile attack.

=== Blast-resistant dwellings ===
Modern multi-story apartment buildings erected in Israel at the time of the attacks were constructed using reinforced concrete columns, beams and floors. Such structurally integral housing units helped to prevent buildings from collapsing as a result of a nearby missile impact.

== Casualties ==
Two Israeli civilians died as a direct result of the missile attacks, while 230 civilians were injured. Between 11 and 74 were killed from incorrect use of gas masks, heart attacks, and incorrect use of the anti-chemical weapons drug atropine. 4,100 buildings were damaged and at least 28 of those buildings destroyed. The area that sustained the most damage was the city of Ramat Gan.

== See also ==
- April 2024 Iranian strikes against Israel
- October 2024 Iranian strikes against Israel
- June 2025 Iranian strikes against Israel
- Red Sea crisis
- 2026 Iran war
