= 14th Quartermaster Detachment =

US Army Reserve water purification unit

The 14th Quartermaster Detachment, is a United States Army Reserve water purification unit stationed in Greensburg, Pennsylvania. During Operation Desert Storm, the detachment lost 13 soldiers and 43 were wounded in an Iraqi Al Hussein Scud ballistic missile attack on 25 February 1991 at Dhahran, Saudi Arabia. The 14th, which had been in Saudi Arabia only six days, suffered the greatest number of casualties of any allied unit during Operation Desert Storm. Eighty-one percent of the unit's 69 soldiers were killed or wounded.

== Mobilization, training and deployment ==
On 15 January 1991, the 14th Quartermaster Detachment was mobilized for service in Operation Desert Storm. Three days later, the unit arrived at Fort Lee, Virginia to conduct intensive mobilization training in preparation for deployment to Saudi Arabia. For the next 30 days, detachment soldiers trained 18 hours a day on the Reverse Osmosis Water Purification Unit (ROWPU) water purification system and common soldier tasks.

The unit, augmented by 35 filler personnel from other active Army and reserve units, arrived in Dhahran, Saudi Arabia on 19 February 1991. The detachment's soldiers were quartered in a warehouse that had been converted to a temporary barracks. There, they waited for the arrival of unit equipment and movement to a field support location.

== Al-Hussein missile attack ==
At 8:40 pm (12:40 pm EST) on 25 February 1991, parts of an Iraqi Al Hussein Scud missile destroyed the barracks housing members of the 14th Quartermaster Detachment. The failure of the Patriot air defense system in tracking the Scud missile over Dhahran was provoked by a shift in the range gate of the radar, due to the continuous use of the software for more than 100 hours without resetting. The radar initially detected the incoming Scud, but lost track of the Al-Hussein when the system failed to predict its new position.

In the single, most devastating attack on U.S. forces during that war, 28 soldiers died and 99 were wounded. The 14th Quartermaster Detachment lost 13 soldiers and suffered 43 wounded. Casualties were evacuated to medical facilities in Saudi Arabia and Germany.

== Response to attack ==
No U.S. community suffered a more significant loss during Operation Desert Storm than Greensburg, a Southwestern Pennsylvania town of 18,000 near Pittsburgh. Once word of the attack reached Pennsylvania, the 99th Army Reserve Command (ARCOM), parent unit of the 14th, began a 24-hour-a-day vigil at the Greensburg Reserve Center to assist family members in their pain and grief. The 99th ARCOM and the 1st Army set up a casualty assistance center in town with chaplains, counselors, social workers, and representatives from several federal agencies. They assisted family members with visits to wounded soldiers at Walter Reed Army Medical Center. Local citizens volunteered to assist in these efforts.

Pennsylvania's governor declared a week of mourning and ordered flags on all state buildings to be lowered to half-staff.

A community memorial service was held on 2 March 1991. Over 1,500 citizens attended, filling the First Presbyterian Church of Greensburg on 300 S Main Street and its adjoining grounds. Local ministers, the mayor, the Governor of Pennsylvania, and the Secretary of the Army honored the members of the 14th Quartermaster Detachment killed in the missile attack.

"They were all of us," said Pennsylvania Governor Robert Casey, "a high school football star, a lover of country music, future homemakers of America, secretaries and salesmen, hunters and fishermen, postal workers and volunteer firemen, friends and lovers, fathers, sons, brothers, and two of our daughters."

Bright yellow ribbons decorated the windows of homes and stores in Greensburg, but there were also black ribbons and wreaths lining the streets in remembrance of the 13 soldiers who were killed.

== Unit redeployment ==
The 14th returned to their mobilization station at Fort Lee, Virginia, on 8 March 1991. They were welcomed back at a special ceremony on Sergeant Seay Field by the Fort Lee community and the Quartermaster General, Brigadier General Paul J. Vanderploog and the Post Commander, Lieutenant General Leon Salomon. General Vanderploog pinned Purple Hearts on two soldiers and National Defense Service Medals on all. General Salomon told the assembled unit they "will be a part of our proud history. We are saddened by your grief, but at the same time we are proud of your accomplishments. Stand tall. Hold your heads up high. The 14th Quartermaster Detachment has made a difference, and then some."

The 14th Quartermaster Detachment returned home to Greensburg, Pennsylvania, on 9 March 1991. Twenty-three soldiers returned home with the unit. Seven of the returning soldiers had been wounded during the attack. At the time of the unit's return to the United States, many of its soldiers were still in hospital recovery wards. They were greeted at Latrobe Airport by family and community members and several dignitaries, including the Major General James Baylor, Commander, 99th Army Reserve Command; Congressman John Murtha and Pennsylvania Lieutenant Governor Mark Singel.

Most of the 14th Quartermaster Detachment members were released from active duty by 1 June 1991. More than a dozen of the unit's soldiers continued to receive medical care at Walter Reed Army Medical Center.

The 14th Quartermaster Detachment is still on the rolls of the U.S. Army Reserve. None of the soldiers with the unit when it deployed to Saudi Arabia are still assigned. In 1999, the unit was deployed to Puerto Barrios, Guatemala, to provide fresh water to soldiers involved in assisting victims of Hurricane Mitch. In 2004, the unit was mobilized for a one-year deployment to support Operation Iraqi Freedom. The unit returned without any casualties.

== Memorials ==
=== Greensburg, Pennsylvania ===
On the first anniversary of this devastating loss, 25 February 1992, a monument to the 14th Quartermaster Detachment was dedicated at the U.S. Army Reserve Center in Greensburg, Pennsylvania. Army Chief of Staff, General Gordon R. Sullivan gave the keynote address and assisted in unveiling the monument. Remarks were given by numerous dignitaries, including Pennsylvania Governor Robert Casey, Senator Arlen Specter, Senator Harris Wofford, Congressmen, John Murtha, Major General James Baylor (Commander, 99th Army Reserve Command), and members of the 14th Quartermaster Detachment – (Specialist Neal E. Gouker).

The monument has a horizontal granite slab as a base, upon which three vertical granite stones weighing 12,000 pounds rest. Perched atop the center pillar is a cast bronze bald eagle. Etched in the center pillar is the emblem of the U.S. Army Quartermaster Corps, preceded by the following quotes:

In honor of the men and women of the 14th Quartermaster Detachment who served both God and country loyally in Operation Desert Storm...

"I have seen in your eyes a fire of determination to get this job done quickly so that we may return to the shore of our great country. My confidence in you is total, our cause is just! Now you must be the thunder and lightning of Desert Storm." General Norman Schwarzkopf

The 69 names of the Detachment soldiers who deployed to Saudi Arabia are featured on two bronze plaques on the front of the right and left stones. On the rear of the left stone is an etching of a female soldier's hands holding the American flag. On the rear of the right stone is an etched map of the Persian Gulf, indicating the locations of Dhahran, Saudi Arabia, and Kuwait.

To the left front of the monument is an actual-sized bronze casting of the boots, M-16 rifle, and helmet, symbolic of the fallen soldier. To the right front are two life-size cast bronze figures: a kneeling man and a standing woman in desert battle dress uniforms, reflecting on the loss of their comrades.

On the cement wall surrounding the monument is a bronze plaque listing the names of the 28 soldiers killed in action. Behind the wall are three flagpoles bearing the flags of the United States, Pennsylvania, and the United States Army. Behind the monument are 13 hemlock trees, the Pennsylvania state tree, planted as a living tribute to the 13 soldiers of the 14th Quartermaster Detachment who lost their lives in the war. The monument faces 90° due east, toward Saudi Arabia.

=== Fort Lee, Virginia ===
On 20 April 1991, the Quartermaster Center and School dedicated a new Water Training Facility on 41st Street in memory of the fallen members of the 14th Quartermaster Detachment. A stone monument and plaque list the names of the 13 deceased unit members.

On 3 March 1993, Fort Lee dedicated one of its gymnasiums as "Clark Gym" in honor of Specialist Beverly Sue Clark of Armagh. Members of the Clark family raised over $100,000 to endow a scholarship in her name at Indiana University of Pennsylvania.

=== Keystone State ===
On 20 July 1998, the U.S. Army Reserve Barge Derrick 6801, Keystone State, was named in honor of the 14th Quartermaster Detachment. The Keystone State is the state nickname of Pennsylvania.
