= Al Hijarah (missile) =

al-Hijarah
- Type: Short-range ballistic missile
- Place of origin: Iraq

Specifications
- Payload capacity: 100-300 kg chemical warhead
- Propellant: Liquid-propelled
- Operational range: 700-900 km
- Guidance system: Inertial

The al-Hijarah missile was an Iraqi liquid propelled inertial short-range ballistic missile. It was also a Scud missile and considered an upgrade of the al-Hussein missile equipped with chemical warheads. The al-Hijarah missile was developed by 1990, according to unconfirmed information it was meant to be used against people and oil wells, supposedly releasing poison gas clouds, as well as igniting oil wells; it was first used in the 1990-1991 Gulf War. One al-Hijarah missile was confirmed to have been fired at Israel during the Gulf War, which landed near Dimona, and was found to have a concrete filled warhead.

== Characteristics ==
The al-Hijarah missile warhead was probably filled with chemical weapons and biological weapons possessed by Iraq at that time like anthrax, botulinum toxin, aflatoxin, sarin, cyclosarin and VX nerve agent. The al-Hijarah missile being a version of the al Hussein also suffered from flight instability and improper guidance. Iraq itself at that time was almost fully indigenous when it came to ballistic missile components and only lacked the ability to locally manufacture Gyroscopes.
