= Circular error probable =

Ballistics measure of a weapon system's precision

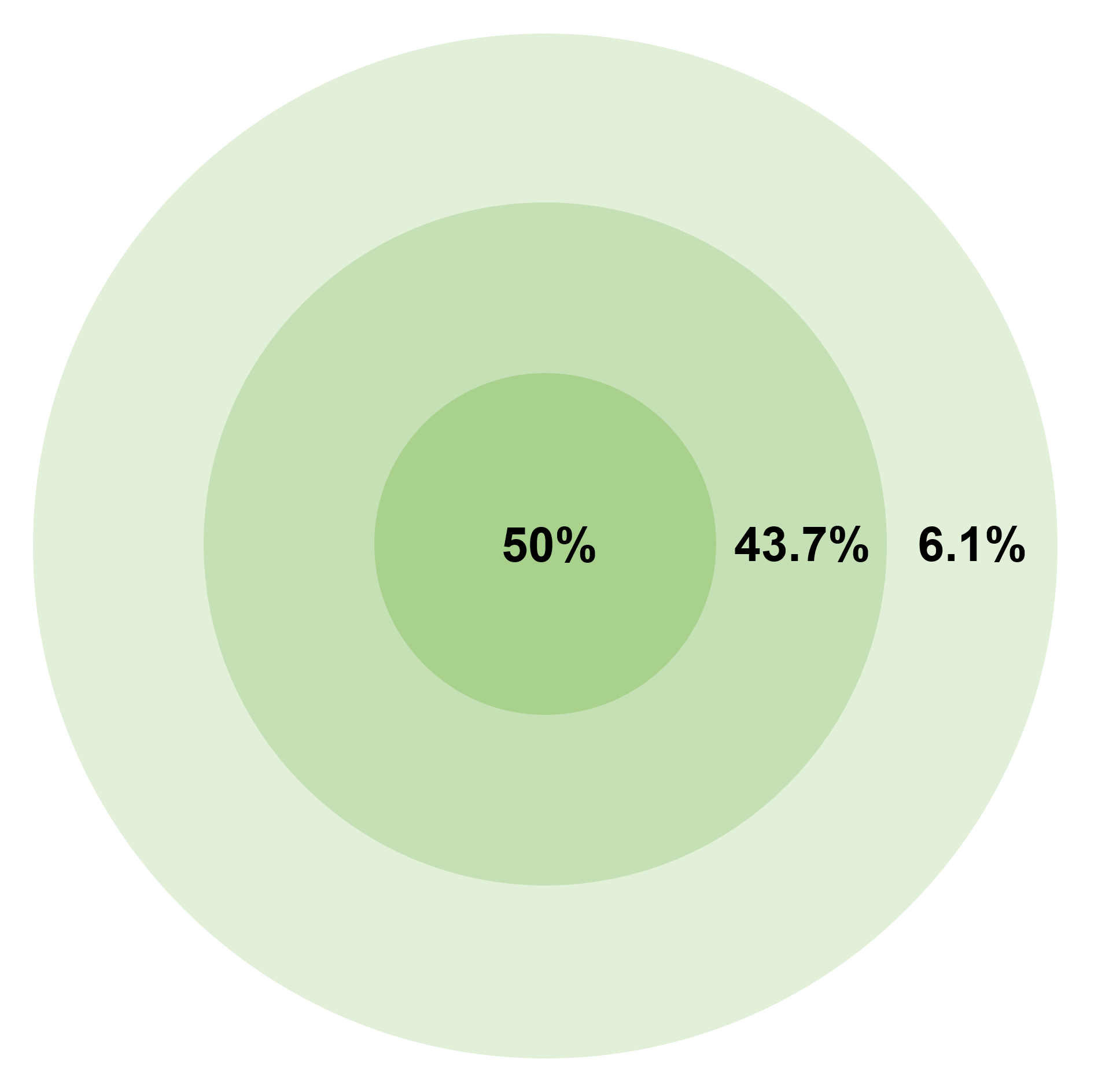
CEP concept and hit probability. 0.2% outside the outmost circle.

Circular error probable (CEP), also circular error probability or circle of equal probability, is a measure of a weapon system's precision in the military science of ballistics. It is defined as the radius of a circle, centered on the aimpoint, that is expected to enclose the landing points of 50% of the rounds; said otherwise, it is the median error radius, which is a 50% confidence interval. That is, if a given munitions design has a CEP of 10 m, when 100 munitions are targeted at the same point, an average of 50 will fall within a circle with a radius of 10 m about that point.

An associated concept, the DRMS (distance root mean square), calculates the square root of the average squared distance error, a form of the standard deviation. Another is the R95, which is the radius of the circle where 95% of the values would fall, a 95% confidence interval.

The concept of CEP also plays a role when measuring the accuracy of a position obtained by a navigation system, such as GPS or older systems such as LORAN and Loran-C.

== Concept ==
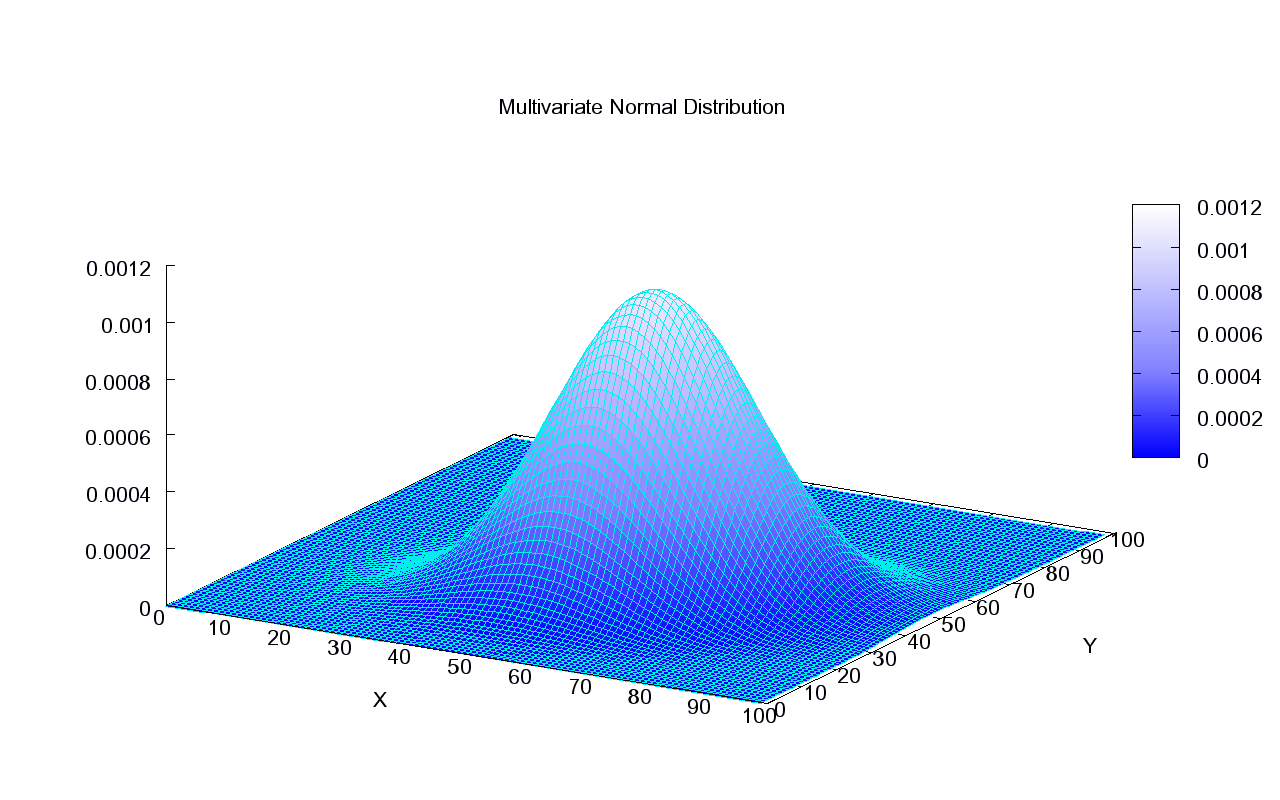
Circular bivariate normal distribution

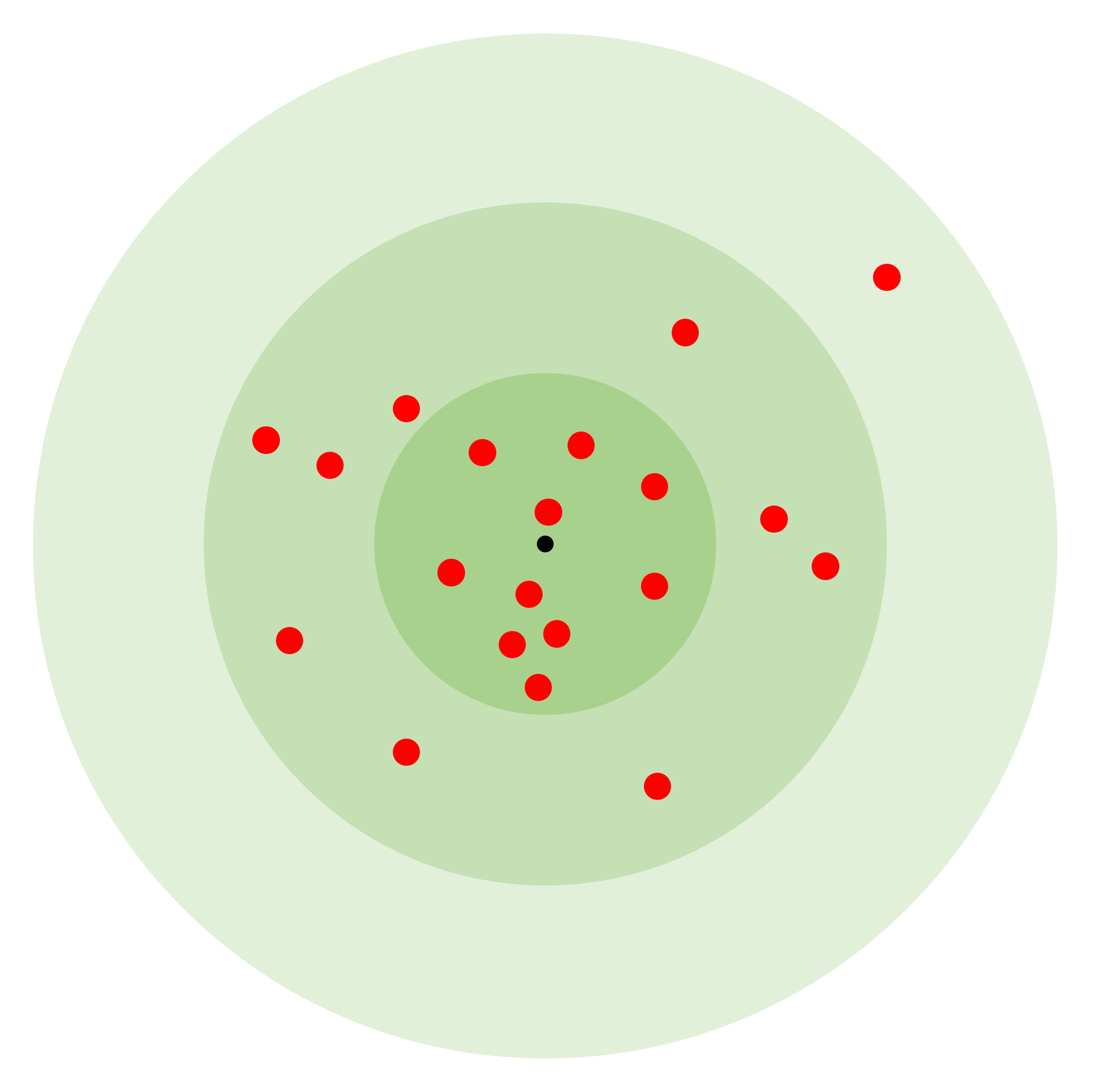
20 hits distribution example

The original concept of CEP was based on a circular bivariate normal distribution (CBN) with CEP as a parameter of the CBN just as μ and σ are parameters of the normal distribution. Munitions with this distribution behavior tend to cluster around the mean impact point, with most reasonably close, progressively fewer and fewer further away, and very few at long distance. That is, if CEP is n metres, 50% of shots land within n metres of the mean impact, 43.7% between n and 2n, and 6.1% between 2n and 3n metres, and the proportion of shots that land farther than three times the CEP from the mean is only 0.2%.

CEP is not a good measure of accuracy when this distribution behavior is not met. Munitions may also have larger standard deviation of range errors than the standard deviation of azimuth (deflection) errors, resulting in an elliptical confidence region. Munition samples may not be exactly on target, that is, the mean vector will not be (0,0). This is referred to as bias.

To incorporate accuracy into the CEP concept in these conditions, CEP can be defined as the square root of the mean square error (MSE). The MSE will be the sum of the variance of the range error plus the variance of the azimuth error plus the covariance of the range error with the azimuth error plus the square of the bias. Thus the MSE results from pooling all these sources of error, geometrically corresponding to radius of a circle within which 50% of rounds will land.

Several methods have been introduced to estimate CEP from shot data. Included in these methods are the plug-in approach of Blischke and Halpin (1966), the Bayesian approach of Spall and Maryak (1992), and the maximum likelihood approach of Winkler and Bickert (2012). The Spall and Maryak approach applies when the shot data represent a mixture of different projectile characteristics (e.g., shots from multiple munitions types or from multiple locations directed at one target).

== Conversion ==
While 50% is a very common definition for CEP, the circle dimension can be defined for percentages. Percentiles can be determined by recognizing that the horizontal position error is defined by a 2D vector which components are two orthogonal Gaussian random variables (one for each axis), assumed uncorrelated, each having a standard deviation $\sigma$. The distance error is the magnitude of that vector; it is a property of 2D Gaussian vectors that the magnitude follows the Rayleigh distribution, with scale factor $\sigma$. The distance root mean square (DRMS), is $\sigma_d=\sqrt{2}\sigma$ and doubles as a sort of standard deviation, since errors within this value make up 63% of the sample represented by the bivariate circular distribution. In turn, the properties of the Rayleigh distribution are that its percentile at level $F \in [0\%, 100\%]$ is given by the following formula:

$$Q(F, \sigma) = \sigma \sqrt{-2\ln(1 - F/100\%)}$$

or, expressed in terms of the DRMS:

$$Q(F, \sigma_d) = \sigma_d \frac{\sqrt{-2\ln(1 - F/100\%)}}{\sqrt{2}}$$

The relation between $Q$ and $F$ are given by the following table, where the $F$ values for DRMS and 2DRMS (twice the distance root mean square) are specific to the Rayleigh distribution and are found numerically, while the CEP, R95 (95% radius) and R99.7 (99.7% radius) values are defined based on the 68–95–99.7 rule:

Measure of $Q$	Probability $F \, (\%)$
DRMS	63.213...
CEP	50
2DRMS	98.169...
R95	95
R99.7	99.7

We can then derive a conversion table to convert values expressed for one percentile level, to another. Said conversion table, giving the coefficients $\alpha$ to convert $X$ into $Y=\alpha.X$, is given by:

From $X \downarrow$ to $Y \rightarrow$	RMS ($\sigma$)	CEP	DRMS	R95	2DRMS	R99.7
RMS ($\sigma$)	1.00	1.18	1.41	2.45	2.83	3.41
CEP	0.849	1.00	1.20	2.08	2.40	2.90
DRMS	0.707	0.833	1.00	1.73	2.00	2.41
R95	0.409	0.481	0.578	1.00	1.16	1.39
2DRMS	0.354	0.416	0.500	0.865	1.00	1.21
R99.7	0.293	0.345	0.415	0.718	0.830	1.00

For example, a GPS receiver having a 1.25 m DRMS will have a 1.25 m × 1.73 = 2.16 m 95% radius.

== See also ==
- List of established military terms
- Probable error
